= Jennifer (given name) =

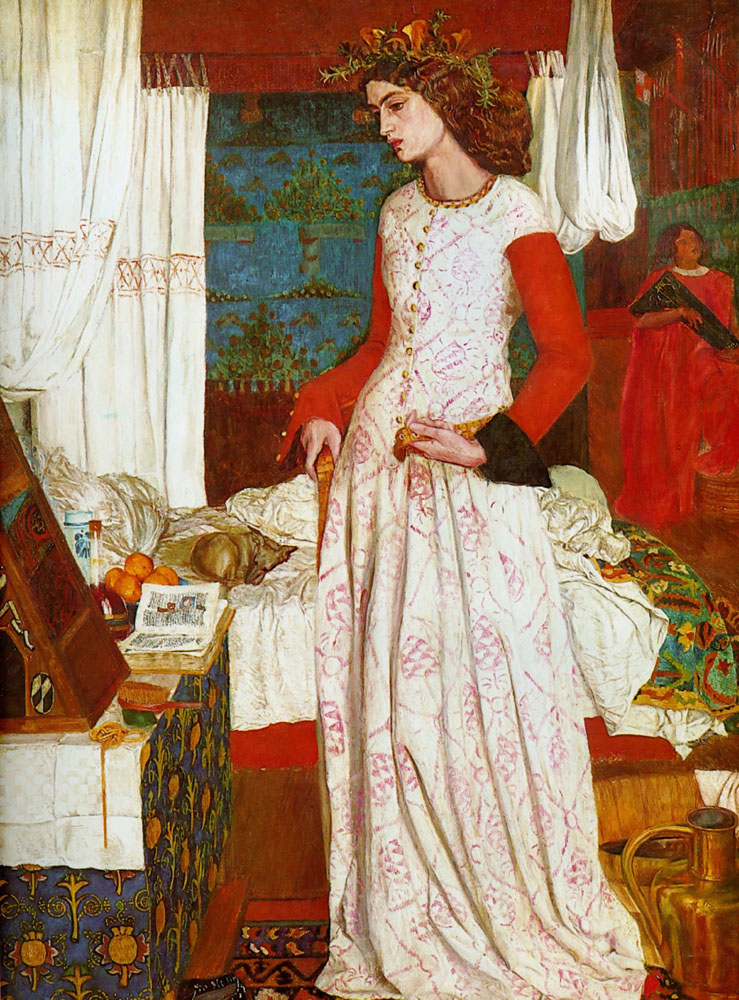
- William Morris, Queen Guinevere, 1858: King Arthur's wife is known to English-speakers by a Norman French cognate of "Jennifer"
- Pronunciation: /ˈdʒɛnɪfər/
- Gender: Feminine

Origin
- Language: Cornish
- Meaning: "Fair One", "White Wave"
- Region of origin: Cornwall

Other names
- Alternative spelling: Jenifer, Yenifer (Spanish), Yennefer (Spanish)
- Nicknames: Jen, Jenn, Jenna, Jenni, Jennie, Jenny
- Related names: Findabair, Guinevere, Gwenhwyfar, Gwenore, Ginevra
- Popularity: see popular names

Jennifer, also spelled Jenifer or Jenefer, is a feminine given name, the Cornish form of Guinevere, that became popular in the English-speaking world in the 20th century.

== Etymology ==
"Jennifer" may mean "the fair one" (from Proto-Celtic "Windo-*sēbro" (cognate with Old Irish síabar "a spectre, phantom, supernatural being [usually in pejorative sense]"). A Cornish form, it is cognate with the Welsh form Gwenhwyfar and with the Old Irish Findabair. Despite the name's similarity to the Old English words "jenefer," "genefer," and "jinifer," these appear to be derived from the juniper plant used to flavor the beverage.

== Cultural influences ==
Jennifer has been in use as a feminine given name in English-speaking countries since the 18th century. The name increased in use in Cornwall in the 18th century when other Cornish names declined in use. The already popular nickname Jenny, which it shared with the well-used name Jane, probably increased usage of the name in Cornwall. Jennifer was primarily used in Cornwall and Devon in the early 19th century and was usually spelled Jenifer. In the United States, Jenifer, as a feminine name, was used mainly by Cornish immigrants in Wisconsin. It was also used for men in the United States, many of whom were probably named after Daniel of St. Thomas Jenifer, a Maryland politician.

Before 1906, the name was fairly uncommon elsewhere in English-speaking countries, but it gained some recognition after George Bernard Shaw used it for the main female character in The Doctor's Dilemma. Jenifer was also the titular heroine of the 1883 novel by Annie Hall Cudlip, first serialized in Dickens' All the Year Round and subsequently published in London and New York. Jennifer became the most common spelling of the name from the 20th century. Various other popular culture references likely inspired increased usage of the name throughout the English-speaking world. The popularity of the American actress Jennifer Jones increased awareness of the name in the 1940s. The name was also used for romantic heroines in several film productions. Jennifer, played by actress Veronica Lake, was the heroine of the 1942 American romantic comedy fantasy film I Married a Witch. Jennifer Jones played Jennifer "Jennie" Appleton, the mysterious heroine of the 1948 American supernatural film Portrait of Jennie. Jennifer is a 1953 American film noir drama mystery film. The name was later used for popular film characters such as Jennifer North, played by actress Sharon Tate in the American drama film Valley of the Dolls, which was released in December 1967 in the United States, and Jennifer Cavalleri, played by Ali MacGraw in the American romantic drama film Love Story, which was released in December 1970 in the U.S. Another influence on the popularity of the names Jenny and Jennifer was the song Jenny Rebecca, written by Carol Hall as a present for her friends, William Goldman and Ilene Jones, after the birth of their daughter. The song recounts all of the happy experiences that await four-day-old Jenny Rebecca. The ballad was first recorded by Barbra Streisand in 1965 and later by other performers. Frederica von Stade recorded the song in 1977 and released it on her 1978 album Song Recital; she named her daughter, Jennifer Rebecca, after the song. Other possible influences on the popularity of the name included the bubblegum pop song "Jennifer Eccles", released in March 1968 by the British band The Hollies, and the folk-pop hit song "Jennifer Juniper", released in 1968 in the UK and the United States by singer-songwriter Donovan. The name might also have come into greater use because it was different from, but sounded like, names such as Jane, Janet, Janice, Joanne, and Jean that had been popular in earlier generations. The fame of American actress Jennifer Lopez popularized the name for Hispanic American girls after 1998.

== Usage ==
In the United Kingdom, the name debuted among the 100 most popular names for newborn girls in 1934. By 1950, the name was among the top 10 most popular names in both the United Kingdom and Australia. Jennifer remained among the top 100 names for girls in England and Wales until 2005, when it began to decline in use. In Ireland, the name was a top 100 name between 1964 and 2010 and was a top 10 name between 1976 and 1989. In New Zealand, the name debuted among the top 100 names for girls in 1932 and remained among the top 100 names until 2003. It was a top 10 name between 1946 and 1960.

In the United States, the name Jennifer first appeared in U.S. Social Security data in 1916, the year after a production of The Doctor's Dilemma made its American debut on Broadway It first appeared on the list of 1,000 most commonly used names for newborn baby girls in 1938, when it ranked at No. 987. The name increased significantly in use for American girls in 1944, the year Jennifer Jones won an Oscar for her role in the 1943 film The Song of Bernadette. The name was in 527th position on the popularity chart in 1942, increased to 397th position on the chart in 1943, to 262nd position in 1944 and to 200th position in 1945. Jennifer continued to increase in use for American girls and was among the top 100 names for American girls by 1956. It was the 10th most popular name for girls in the United States in 1967, rose to 4th on the popularity chart in 1968, to 3rd in 1969, and to 1st in 1970. Jennifer then remained the single most popular name for newborn girls in the United States every year from 1970 to 1984, inclusive. The name dropped out of the top 10 in the United States in 1992 and out of the top 100 in 2009. It has since continued to decline in use, but has remained among the top 1,000 names in use for American girls and, as of 2024, was ranked 546th on the popularity chart.

In Canada, the name debuted among the top 100 names for newborn girls in 1949 and was a top 10 name between 1968 and 1992. It has since declined in use.

It has also been well used in other European and North American countries. In France, the name debuted among the top 1,000 names for girls in 1969. The name was among the top 100 names for French girls between 1977 and 1997. It reached peak popularity in 1985 and 1986, when it was No. 9 on the French popularity chart. In Germany, the name was among the top 10 names between 1984 and 1995. In Belgium the name was among the top 100 names between 1995 and 1997 and among the top 200 names between 1998 and 2003. In Sweden, the name was among the top 100 names for girls between 1998 and 2007. In Switzerland, the name was among the top 100 names between 1998 and 2006. In Italy, the name was among the top 200 names for girls between 1999 and 2021. In Austria, the name was among the top 100 names between 1985 and 2004. In the Czech Republic, the name was among the top 200 names between 1993 and 2011. In Poland, the name was among the top 200 names between 2000 and 2009. In Mexico, the name was among the top 150 names for girls in 2020 and 2021.

== Women ==
=== A–C ===
- Jenifer (singer) (born 1982), French singer and actress
- Jennifer Aaker (born 1967), American social psychologist and Professor of Marketing
- Jennifer Abbott (born 1965), Canadian film director
- Jennifer Abel (born 1991), Canadian diver
- Jennifer Abod (born 1946), American feminist activist, musician, journalist, and filmmaker
- Jennifer Abruzzo, American attorney and politician
- Jennifer Ackerman (born 1959), American author
- Jennifer Ahern (born 1978), American epidemiologist
- Jennifer Åkerman (born 1989), Swedish model, blogger and singer
- Jennifer Ailshire, Educator and scholar (born)
- Jennifer Alanyo, Ugandan physician, military officer, and politician
- Jenifer Alcorn (born 1970), American boxer
- Jennifer Alden, Australian politician
- Jennifer Alexander (1972–2007), Canadian ballet dancer
- Jennifer Lucy Allan, British writer, researcher, and radio presenter
- Jennifer Allen (born 1961), American author and commentator
- Jennifer Alley, American basketball coach
- Jennifer Alleyn (born 1969), Canadian artist, filmmaker, writer, and photographer
- Jennifer Allison (born 1966), American author
- Jennifer Allmark (born 1969), Swedish professional golfer
- Jennifer Amaro (born 2000), Mexican footballer
- Jennifer M. Anderson (born 1967), American judge
- Jennifer Angus (born 1961), Canadian artist, professor, and author
- Jennifer Aniston (born 1969), American actress, producer and businesswoman
- Jennifer Anson (born 1977), American-Palaun judoka
- Jennifer Antony, Indian actress and model
- Jennifer Archer (born 1957), American author
- Jennifer Arcuri (born 1985), American technology entrepreneur
- Jennifer Arias (born 1987), Colombian politician
- Jennifer L. Armentrout (born 1980), American author
- Jennifer Armintrout (born 1980), American author
- Jennifer Armour (born 1985), American actress and voice artist
- Jennifer Armstrong (curler) (born 1992), Canadian curler
- Jennifer Armstrong (politician), American politician
- Jennifer Armstrong (writer) (born 1961), American children's writer
- Jennifer Arndt, American politician
- Jennifer Arveláez (born 1982), Venezuelan athlete
- Jennifer Ashton (born 1969), American physician, author and television correspondent
- Jennifer Aspen (born 1973), American actress
- Jennifer Atkins, British writer
- Jennifer Attrep, American lawyer
- Jennifer Jones Austin (born 1969), American executive
- Jennifer Aylmer (born 1972), American operatic soprano
- Jennifer Ayoo, Ugandan politician
- Jennifer Azzi (born 1968), American basketball coach
- Jennifer Baichwal (born 1965), Canadian documentary filmmaker, writer and producer
- Jennifer Balakrishnan, American mathematician
- Jenifer Bamuturaki, Ugandan businesswoman and corporate executive
- Jennifer Mistry Bansiwal, Indian actress
- Jennifer Margaret Barker (born 1965), Scottish-American classical composer
- Jennifer Lynn Barnes (born 1984), American author
- Jennifer Barnhart (born 1972), American actress and puppeteer
- Jennifer Bartlett (1941–2022), American artist
- Jennifer Batten (born 1957), American guitarist
- Jennifer Baumgardner (born 1970), American writer, activist and filmmaker
- Jennifer Baxter (born 1976), Canadian actress and comedian
- Jennifer Beals (born 1963), American actress and former teen model
- Jennifer Beard, American physician
- Jennifer Bendery (born 1974), American political journalist
- Jenifer Benítez (born 1988), Spanish diver
- Jennifer Berman, American sexual health expert, urologist, and female sexual medicine specialist
- Jennifer Bernhard (born 1966), American electrical engineer
- Jennifer Berry (born 1983), American beauty pageant titleholder
- Jennifer Betit Yen (born 1986), American actress, lawyer, producer and writer
- Jennifer Biddall (born 1980), English actress
- Jennifer Billingsley, American television, stage and film actress
- Jennifer Black, Scottish actress
- Jennifer Blake (wrestler) (born 1983), Canadian professional wrestler
- Jennifer R. Blake, American actress and producer
- Jennifer Blanc (born 1974), American actress
- Jennifer Blatherwick, Canadian politician
- Jennifer Blow (born 1991), Australian goalball player
- Jennifer Bolande (born 1957), American artist
- Jennifer Bonjean (born c. 1970), American attorney
- Jennifer Botterill (born 1979), Canadian former women's hockey player
- Jennifer Boykin, American engineer
- Jennifer Finney Boylan (born 1958), American author, reality television personality and transgender activist
- Jennifer Brady (born 1995), American tennis player
- Jenifer Branning (born 1979), American lawyer and politician
- Jennifer Braun (born 1991), German singer
- Jennifer Brea, American documentary filmmaker and activist
- Jenifer Brening (born 1996), German singer
- Jennifer Brewin, Canadian theatre creator and artistic director
- Jennifer Bricker (born 1987), American acrobat and aerialist
- Jennifer Brooke (born 1993/1994), English actress
- Jennifer Brown (born 1972), Swedish singer
- Jennifer Brozek (born 1970), American freelance author
- Jennifer Brunner (born 1957), American attorney, politician and judge
- Jennifer Burke (née Lo), Canadian television journalist
- Jennifer Burton (born 1968), American model and actress
- Jennifer Byrne (born 1955), Australian journalist, television presenter and former book publisher
- Jennifer Byrne (research scientist) (born 1966), Australian Professor of Molecular Oncology at University of Sydney
- Jennifer Camper (born 1957), Lebanese-American cartoonist and graphic artist
- Jennifer Johnson Cano, American operatic mezzo-soprano
- Jennifer Capriati (born 1976), American former world No. 1 tennis player
- Jennifer Carnahan (born 1976), American political operative
- Jennifer Carpenter (born 1979), American actress
- Jennifer Carroll (born 1959), Trinidadian-American Republican politician and retired naval officer
- Jennifer Carroll Foy (born 1981), American lawyer and politician
- Jennifer Carroll MacNeill (born 1980), Irish Fine Gael politician
- Jennifer Castle, Canadian singer-songwriter
- Jennifer Cave (died 2005), American female murder victim
- Jennifer Celotta (born 1971), American television producer, writer and director
- Jennifer Paige Chambers, American musical theatre actress
- Jennifer Chan (artist), Canadian media artist, curator, and programmer
- Jennifer Chan (musician), former Hong Kong radio personality, creative director, singer-songwriter, film actress and architect
- Jennifer Dy Chan (born 1965), Filipina archer and Olympian
- Jennifer Anne Chappill (1959–2006), Australian botanist
- Jennifer Charles (born 1968), American singer, poet and writer
- Jennifer Childs-Roshak, American physician and executive
- Jennifer Choe-Groves (born 1969), American lawyer and judge
- Jennifer Clement (born 1960), American-Mexican author
- Jennifer Cody (born 1969), American actress and dancer
- Jennifer Cohen (athletic director) (born 1969), American college sports administrator
- Jennifer Cohen (fitness) (born 1976), Canadian fitness personality
- Jennifer Colón, Puerto Rican beauty pageant titleholder
- Jennifer Condos, American bass guitarist
- Jennifer Connelly (born 1970), American actress
- Jennifer Conrad, American economist
- Jennifer Cook O'Toole (born 1975), American author and public speaker
- Jennifer Cooke (born 1964), American former actress
- Jennifer Coolidge (born 1961), American actress
- Jennifer Corday (born 1966), American singer
- Jennifer Cowley (born 1974), American urban planner and academic
- Jennifer Elise Cox (born 1969), American actress
- Jennifer Crittenden (born 1969), American screenwriter and producer
- Jennifer Crocker, American Professor of Social Psychology
- Jennifer Croft (born c. 1981/82), American author, critic and translator
- Jennifer Croxton (1944–2024), British actress
- Jennifer Crumbley (born 1978), American criminal
- Jennifer Crusie (born 1949), American novelist
- Jenifer Curnow (1931–2013), New Zealand librarian and writer
- Jenifer Cushman (born 1967), American academic administrator

=== D–H ===
- Jennifer Dahlgren (born 1984), Argentine hammer thrower
- Jennifer Dale (born 1956), Canadian actress and former dancer
- Jennifer Damiano (born 1991), American actress and singer
- Jennifer Daniel (1936–2017), Welsh actress
- Jennifer Daniel (illustrator), American artist, designer and art director
- Jennifer Darling (born 1946), American voice, film and television actress
- Jennifer Daskal (born 1972), American lawyer
- Jennifer Daugherty (1979–2010), American murder victim
- Jennifer Davidson (bobsledder), American bobsledder and Olympian
- Jennifer Davidson (executive) (1969–2007), American businesswoman
- Jennifer Decilveo, American record producer and songwriter
- Jennifer Decker (born 1982), French actress
- Jennifer Des (born 1975), Belgian photographer
- Jennifer Dickson (born 1936), South African-born British photographer
- Jennifer Dionne, American scientist and pioneer of nanophotonics
- Jennifer A. Di Toro (born 1967), American judge
- Jennifer Dixon, British chief executive of the Health Foundation
- Jennifer Susan Dodd Clarke, British philanthropist and business executive
- Jennifer Dodds (born 1991), Scottish curler
- Jennifer Doleac, American economist
- Jennifer Don (born 1984), Taiwanese-American figure skater
- Jennifer Donahue, American political analyst
- Jennifer Donnelly (born 1963), American young adult fiction writer
- Jennifer Dorow (born 1970), American attorney
- Jennifer A. Dorsey (born 1971), American attorney and jurist
- Jennifer Doudna (born 1964), American biochemist
- Jennifer Dougherty (born 1961), American politician
- Jennifer Douglas (born 1964), American writer, producer and activist
- Jennifer Dowd, American social scientist
- Jennifer Kewley Draskau (died 2024), historian, linguist, teacher and political candidate
- Jennifer duBois (born 1983), American novelist
- Jennifer Dugan, American activist and writer
- Jennifer Dulos (née Farber; 1968–2019), American murder victim
- Jennifer Dundas, American entrepreneur and actress
- Jennifer Dunn (1941–2007), American politician and engineer
- Jennifer Eberhardt (born 1965), American social psychologist
- Jennifer Echegini (born 2001), Dutch born Nigerian footballer
- Jennifer Echols, American writer of romantic fiction for young adults
- Jennifer Edwards (born 1957), American actress
- Jennifer Egan (born 1962), American novelist and short-story writer
- Jennifer Egelryd (born 1990), Swedish football forward
- Jennifer Ehle (born 1969), English-American actress
- Jennifer Elie (born 1986), American professional tennis player
- Jennifer Eliogu (born 1976), Nigerian actress and singer
- Jennifer Elisseeff (born 1973), American biomedical engineer, ophthalmologist and academic
- Jennifer Ellison (born 1983), English actress, television personality, dancer, singer and former glamour model
- Jennifer Walker Elrod (born 1966), American lawyer and judge
- Jennifer Elster, American experimental artist, filmmaker, writer, photographer, musician and performer
- Jennifer Elvgren, American author and journalist
- Jennifer England (born 1978), American model and actress
- Jennifer English, British voice actress
- Jennifer Ertman (1978–1993), American murder victim
- Jennifer Esposito (born 1973), American actress and author
- Jenifer Estess (1963–2003), American theatre producer
- Jennifer Euston (born 1974), American casting director
- Jennifer Fallon (born 1959), Australian author of fantasy and science fiction
- Jennifer Farley (born 1986), American television personality known as JWoww
- Jennifer Faunce (born 1965), American politician and judge
- Jennifer Ferrin (born 1979), American actress
- Jennifer Mitchell Fetch, Canadian scientist
- Jennifer Fichter (born 1984), American convicted criminal
- Jennifer Fidler, American politician in Alabama
- Jennifer Figge (born 1952), American swimmer
- Jennifer Finch (born 1966), American musician, designer and photographer
- Jennifer Finlayson-Fife, American psychologist, sexuality educator and clinical professional counsellor
- Jennifer Finnigan (born 1979), Canadian actress
- Jennifer Fiori (1986–2021), Italian racing cyclist
- Jennifer Fisher (art historian) (born 1955), Canadian art historian and curator
- Jennifer Fisher (athlete) (born 1959), Bermudian middle-distance runner
- Jennifer Fisher (designer), American jewelry designer
- Jennifer Flackett, American film director and screenwriter
- Jennifer Flavin (born 1968), American entrepreneur, businesswoman, former model and wife of Sylvester Stallone
- Jennifer Flay (born 1959), New Zealand director of the Fiac
- Jennifer Fleiss, co-founder of Rent the Runway
- Jennifer Crystal Foley (born 1973), American actress
- Jennifer Fonstad, American venture capital investor and entrepreneur
- Jennifer Foster, English scholar of prehistoric and medieval archaeology
- Jenifer Fox (born 1960), American educator, author, and speaker
- Jennifer Fox (film producer), American film producer
- Jennifer Fox (documentary filmmaker) (born 1959), American film producer, director, writer and cinematographer
- Jennifer Francis, American senior scientist at Woods Hole Research Center
- Jennifer Freed, American professor, psychological astrologer, and author
- Jennifer Freeman (born 1985), American actress
- Jennifer Freyd (born 1957), American researcher, author, educator and public speaker
- Jennifer Fry (born 1989), South African badminton player
- Jennifer Zimdahl Galt (born 1959), American diplomat
- Jennifer Gardiner (born 2001), Canadian ice hockey player
- Jennifer Gareis (born 1970), American actress and beauty pageant titleholder
- Jennifer Garner (born 1972), American actress and producer
- Jennifer Geerlings-Simons (born 1953), Surinamese politician
- Jennifer Gibbons (1963–1993), British author
- Jennifer Gibney (born 1964), Irish actress
- Jennifer Gießler (born 1993), German politician
- Jennifer Gilbert (violinist) (born 1970), American violinist
- Jennifer Gilbert (born 1992), Canadian softball player
- Jennifer E. Glick, American sociologist and social demographer
- Jennifer Eaton Gökmen (born 1971), American writer and editor
- Jennifer Gommerman, Canadian immunologist
- Ginnifer Goodwin (born Jennifer Goodwin; born 1978), American actress
- Jenniffer González-Colón (born 1976), Puerto Rican politician
- Jennifer Granholm (born 1959), Canadian-American politician, lawyer, educator and author
- Jennifer Grant (born 1966), American actress
- Jennifer Gratz, plaintiff in 2003 U.S. Supreme Court affirmative action case
- Jennifer Gray (actress) (1916–1962), British actress
- Jennifer Gray (cricketer) (born 1993), Irish cricketer
- Jennifer Grey (born 1960), American actress
- Jennifer Griffin, American journalist
- Jennifer Guevara (born 1987), Puerto Rican model and beauty pageant titleholder
- Jennifer Guthrie, American actress
- Jennifer Gutiérrez Bermejo (born 1995), Swiss-born Spanish handballer
- Jennifer Hale (born 1965), Canadian-American voice actress
- Jennifer Hall (born 1977), American actress
- Jennifer Caron Hall (born 1958), English actress, singer and journalist
- Jennifer Hamson (born 1992), American basketball and volleyball player
- Jennifer Hansen, Australian journalist and former news presenter
- Jennifer Hanson (born 1973), American country music singer
- Jennifer Harman (born 1964), American professional poker player
- Jennifer Harmon (born 1943), American actress
- Jenifer Hart (1914–2005), English academic and senior civil servant
- Jennifer Hart (1979–2018), one of the American perpetrators of the Hart family murders
- Jenifer Haselgrove (1930–2015), British physicist and computer scientist
- Jennifer Hawke-Petit (1958–2007), American nurse and murder victim
- Jennifer Hawkins (born 1983), American model, television presenter, beauty pageant titleholder, and Miss Universe 2004
- Jennifer Michael Hecht (born 1965), American teacher, author, poet and historian
- Jennifer Hedger (born 1975), Canadian television personality
- Jennifer M. Heemstra, Professor of Chemistry at Emory University
- Jennifer Hemingway, American federal law enforcement officer and former political advisor
- Jennifer Hennessy (born 1970), English actress
- Jennifer Hermoso (born 1990), Spanish footballer
- Jennifer Herold (born 1985), American politician
- Jennifer Herrema, American rock music singer-songwriter, record producer, artist, and model
- Jennifer Hetrick (born 1958), American actress
- Jennifer Love Hewitt (born 1979), American actress, producer, and singer
- Jennifer Higham (born 1984), British actress
- Jennifer A. Hillman (born 1957), American lawyer and professor
- Jennifer Hines, American mezzo-soprano
- Jennifer Ho, American government official
- Jennifer A. Hoeting, American statistician
- Jennifer Holland (born 1987), American actress and model
- Jennifer Hollett] (born 1975), Canadian media executive and former television personality and political activist
- Jennifer Holliday (born 1960), American singer and actress
- Jennifer L. Holm (born 1968), American children's writer
- Jennifer Holmes (actress), American actress
- Jennifer Holt (born 1920–1997), American actress
- Jennifer Homendy (born 1971), American government official
- Jennifer Horn (born 1964), American politician
- Jennifer F. M. Horne (died 2008), Kenyan ornithologist and bioacoustician
- Jennifer Hosten (born 1947), Grenadian radio announcer, development worker, diplomat, author, model and beauty queen who won the Miss World 1970 contest
- Jennifer Howard (actress) (1925–1993), American actress
- Jennifer Howard (Australian politician) (born 1965), Australian politician
- Jennifer Howard (Canadian politician), Canadian politician
- Jennifer Howell, Canadian-American voice actress
- Jennifer Howell (social activist), American film producer, actor, and social activist
- Jennifer Hudson (born 1981), American singer and actress
- Jennifer Hutt (born 1970), American radio host, television host, author and lawyer
- Jennifer Hylton, Jamaican reggae singer known professionally as Foxy Brown

=== I–M ===
- Jennifer Ikeda, American actress, author and audiobook narrator
- Jennifer Irwin (born 1975), Canadian actress
- Jennifer Jackson (model) (born 1945), American model
- Jennifer Jackson (1952–2015), Canadian speed skater and Olympian
- Jennifer Lyn Jackson (1969–2010), American model
- Jennifer Jajeh, American actress and writer
- Jennifer James, English actress
- Jennifer Jasberg (born 1983), German politician
- Jennifer Jayne (1931–2006), English film and television actress
- Jennifer Jenkins, British linguist and academic
- Jennifer Johnson (Canadian politician), Canadian politician
- Jennifer Johnson (golfer) (born 1991), American professional golfer
- Jennifer Johnson (table tennis) (born 1948), American para-table tennis player
- Jennifer Johnson (Trinidad and Tobago politician) (1946–2023), Trinidad and Tobago politician
- Jennifer A. Johnson, American sociologist
- Jennifer J. Johnson, American lawyer
- Jennifer L. Johnson, American diplomat
- Jennifer M. Johnson, American television writer and producer
- Jenifer Johnston (born 1901), Scottish journalist
- Jennifer Johnston (novelist) (1930–2025), Irish novelist
- Jennifer Johnston (mezzo-soprano), English opera singer
- Jennifer Johnston (politician) (born 1954), American politician from Alaska
- Jenifer Jones, American politician
- Jennifer Jones (1919–2009), American actress and mental health advocate
- Jennifer Jones (curler) (born 1974), Canadian curler and Olympian
- Jennifer Jostyn, American actress
- Jennifer Keesmaat (born 1970), Canadian real estate developer and urban planner
- Jennifer Kendal (1934–1984), English actress and the founder of the Prithvi Theatre
- Jennifer Kent, Australian director, screenwriter, and former actress
- Jennifer Kesse (1981 – disappeared 2006), missing American woman
- Jennifer Ketcham, American writer, reality television personality, blogger, and artist
- Jenifer Kilapio (born 2000), Filipino wushu practitioner
- Jennifer Kimball, American singer-songwriter
- Jennifer Kirby (born 1988), English television and stage actress
- Jennifer Klein (academic), American historian and academic
- Jennifer Klein (footballer) (born 1999), Austrian footballer
- Jennifer Klein (soccer coach) (born 1984), American soccer coach
- Jennifer Klein (public official) (born 1965), American public official
- Jennifer Kluska, American film director
- Jennifer Knapp (born 1974), American-Australian musician
- Jennifer Knust, American Biblical scholar
- Jennifer Kotwal, Indian actress
- Jennifer Kumiyama (born 1980), American actress, singer and disability rights activist
- Jennifer Kupcho (born 1997), American professional golfer
- Jennifer Lahmers (born 1984), American television news reporter, news anchor and model
- Jennifer Lalor (born 1974), American soccer player
- Jennifer Landon (born 1983), American actress
- Jennifer Lash (1938–1993), English novelist and painter
- Jennifer Lawrence (born 1990), American actress and producer
- Jennifer Leak (1947–2024), Canadian film and television actress
- Jennifer Leaning, American health scholar
- Jennifer Lee (filmmaker) (born 1971), American screenwriter, film director and chief creative officer and Walt Disney Animation Studios
- Jennifer Lee (scientist), British Antarctic environmentalist
- Jennifer 8. Lee (born 1976), American journalist
- Jennifer Nicole Lee (born 1975), American fitness model, motivational speaker, and author
- Jennifer Lee (equestrian) (born 1965), Hong Kong equestrian
- Jennifer Lee (born 1987), American record producer and DJ known professionally as Tokimonsta
- Jennifer Lee (sociologist) (born 1968), American sociologist and academic
- Jennifer Lehane (born 1998), Irish boxer
- Jennifer Jason Leigh (born 1962), American actress and producer
- Jennifer LeRoy (born 1974), American model and actress
- Jenifer Levin (born 1955), American fiction writer
- Jenifer Lewis (born 1957), American actress, comedian, singer and activist
- Jennifer A. Lewis (born 1964), American materials scientist and engineer
- Jennifer Li, neuroscientist
- Jennifer Lien (born 1974), American former actress
- Jennifer Lim (British actress), Singaporean actress based in the United Kingdom
- Jennifer Lim (theatre actress) (born 1979), American theatre actress
- Jennifer Lines, Canadian theatre and television actress
- Jennifer Long (died 1998), American murder victim
- Jenifer Loon (born 1963), American politician
- Jennifer Lopez (born 1969), American singer, actress, producer and dancer
- Jennifer Lopez (meteorologist), American meteorologist
- Jennifer Loud American nurse practitioner; assistant chief of the National Cancer Institute's clinical genetics branch
- Jennifer Love (chemist), American chemist and academic
- Jenifer Lovell (born 1974), American rhythmic gymnast
- Jennifer D. Luff, American historian of 20th century politics
- Jennifer S. Lund (born 1940), British neuroscientist
- Jennifer Lynch (born 1968), American filmmaker
- Jennifer Lynn, American singer based in Germany
- Jennifer Lyon (1972–2010), American reality show participant
- Jennifer Macdonald, American conceptual artist
- Jennifer Maia (born 1988), Brazilian professional mixed martial artist
- Jennifer Maiden (born 1949), Australian poet
- Jennifer Maidman (born 1958), British musician, singer, producer and actress
- Jennifer Malat, American sociologist
- Jennifer Manly, American neuropsychologist
- Jennifer Marohasy (born 1963), Australian biologist, columnist and blogger
- Jennifer Martínez (born 1971), American human rights lawyer
- Jennifer Mason (sociologist) (born 1958), British sociologist
- Jennifer Matthews (1964–2009), American Central Intelligence Agency officer
- Jennifer Mayani (born 1979), Chilean model[2] and actress
- Jennifer McClellan (born 1972), American politician
- Jennifer McFalls (born 1971), American Olympic softball player
- Jennifer McGregor, American curator and arts planner
- Jennifer McIntosh (born 1991), Scottish sports shooter and fantasy author
- Jennifer C. McIntosh, American hydrogeologist and Professor of Hydrology and Atmospheric Sciences
- Jenifer McKitrick (born 1962), American songwriter
- Jennifer McMahon (writer) (born 1968), American novelist
- Jennifer A. McMahon (1956–2023), Australian philosopher
- Jennifer Carroll MacNeill (born 1980), Irish politician
- Jennifer Mee (born 1991), American murderer better known as "Hiccup Girl", American woman with a long-lasting case of the hiccups
- Jennifer Mendenhall (born 1960), American actress and audiobook narrator
- Jennifer Merelaid Hankins (born 1985), Swedish politician
- Jennifer Metcalfe (born 1983), English actress
- Jennifer Meyer (born 1977), American jewellery designer
- Jennifer Miller (born 1961), American circus entertainer, writer, and academic
- Jennifer Miller (actress), Canadian actress
- Jennifer Milmore, American actress
- Jennifer Missoni (born 1985), Italian actress
- Jennifer Monahan, American newscaster, better known as J. C. Monahan
- Jennifer Monson (born 1961), American dancer and choreographer
- Jennifer Montagu (born 1931), British art historian
- Jenifer H. Moore, American diplomat
- Jennifer Moore (1988–2006), American murder victim
- Jennifer Morgan (born 1971), American technology executive
- Jennifer Morla (born 1955), American graphic designer
- Jennifer Morrison (born 1979), American actress, director, producer and former child model
- Jennifer Moss (actress) (1945–2006), English actress and singer
- Jennifer Sheridan Moss, American papyrologist
- Jennifer Moyle (1921–2016), British biochemist
- Jennifer Mucino-Fernandez (born 2002), American archer and Olympian
- Jennifer Mudge (born 1978), American television and stage actress
- Jenifer Abaho Muheesi, Ugandan politician
- Jennifer Muñoz Sandoval (born 1993), American-born Guatemalan footballer
- Jennifer Muñoz Velázquez (born 1996), American-born Mexican former professional footballer
- Jennifer Murphy (born 1979), American Internet personality and former beauty pageant contestant
- Jennifer Musa (née Wren; 1917–2008), Irish-born Pakistani nurse, politician, social worker and the wife of Qazi Musa
- Jennifer Musisi, Ugandan lawyer and public administrator

=== N–R ===
- Jennifer E. Nashold, American attorney
- Jenifer Neils (born 1950), American classical archaeologist
- Jennifer Nettles (born 1974), American singer, actress and record producer
- Jennifer Newton-Small (born 1975), American author and journalist
- Jennifer R. Niebyl (born 1942), Canadian professor
- Jennifer A. Nielsen (born 1971), American author
- Jennifer Nierva (born 1999), Filipina volleyball player
- Jennifer O'Connell (born 1983), Canadian politician
- Jennifer O’Connor (born 1973), American singer-songwriter
- Jennifer O’Connor (born 1984), Australian netball player
- Jennifer Murnane O'Connor (born 1966), Irish politician
- Jennifer O'Dell (born 1974), American actress
- Jennifer O’Malley Dillon (born 1976), American former political strategist
- Jennifer O'Neill (born 1948), Brazilian-born American author, model and former actress
- Jennifer Ouellette, American science writer and editor
- Jennifer Ouellette, American milliner
- Jennifer Oxley, American author, illustrator, animator, and television director
- Jennifer Padilla (born 1990), Colombian track and field athlete
- Jennifer Paes (née Dutton), Indian former basketball player
- Jennifer Page (born 1944), British businesswoman
- Jennifer Pagliaro (1983–2019), American singer-songwriter
- Jennifer Pahlka (born 1969), American businesswoman and political advisor
- Jennifer Paige (born 1973), American singer
- Jennifer Pan, American political scientist
- Jennifer Pan (born 1986), Vietnamese-Canadian killer
- Jenifer Papararo (born 1966), Canadian curator and writer of contemporary art
- Jennifer Paredes, American actress
- Jenifer Sang Eun Park, Korean American author
- Jennifer Paterson (1928–1999), British celebrity cook, author, actress and television personality
- Jennifer Paz, Filipina actress
- Jennifer Peace (military officer), U.S. Army captain
- Jennifer Howe Peace, American religious scholar
- Jennifer Peña (born 1983), Mexican-American Texan/Latin pop singer
- Jennifer Pertsch, Canadian writer, producer, and one of the founding partners of Fresh TV
- Jennifer Philbin (born 1974), American producer and screenwriter
- Jennifer Piepszak, American financial executive
- Jennifer Pisana, Canadian television and movie actress
- Jennifer Podemski (born 1973), Canadian film and television actress and producer
- Jennifer Poirier, American politician
- Jennifer Poskitt, New Zealand academic
- Jennifer Psaki (born 1978), American television political analyst and former government official
- Jennifer Radloff (born 1961), South African feminist activist
- Jenifer Rajkumar (born 1982), American politician and lawyer
- Jennifer Anne Reddall (born 1975), American prelate bishop
- Jennifer Clyburn Reed, American businessperson and schoolteacher
- Jennifer Reeser (born 1968), American poet
- Jennifer Diane Reitz (born 1959), American writer, webcomic author and game designer
- Jennifer Rachel (born 1999), Indonesian singer, dancer, and actress
- Jennifer Rhodes (born Janice Wilson; born 1947), American actress
- Jennifer Ramírez Rivero (1978–2018), Venezuelan model and businesswoman
- Jennifer Rice, Canadian politician
- Jenifer Rice-Genzuk Henry, American screenwriter and former singer
- Jennifer Richeson (born 1972), American social psychologist
- Jenifer Ringer (born 1972/1973), American ballet dancer and educator
- Jennifer Ringley (born 1976), American Internet personality and former lifecaster
- Jennifer Risper (born 1987), American professional basketball player
- Jennifer Rivera, American mezzo-soprano
- Jennifer Roberson (born 1953), American author
- Jennifer Roberts, American politician, businesswoman and former diplomat
- Jennifer Robertson (born 1971), Canadian actress, writer, and comedian
- Jennifer Griffith Robertson (born 1988), Canadian real estate developer
- Jennifer Kaytin Robinson (born 1988), American director, producer, and writer
- Jennifer Rodgers (born c. 1970/71), American attorney and legal analyst
- Jennifer Roizen, American chemist
- Jennifer Rokhman, American rhythmic gymnast
- Jennifer Rothman (born 1969), American legal scholar
- Jennifer Rothschild (born 1963), American author, speaker, podcast host, and founder of Fresh Grounded Faith events for women
- Jennifer Rowe (born 1955), British civil servant
- Jennifer June Rowe (born 1948), Australian author
- Jennifer Rubin (born 1962), American political commentator
- Jennifer Rubin, British social scientist, policy analyst, and academic
- Jennifer Collene Rubin (born 1962), American actress
- Jennifer Rubio, American businesswoman
- Jennifer Ash Rudick (born 1963), American journalist, author, and filmmaker
- Jennifer Ruiz-Williams (born 1983), U.S.-born Mexican football coach and former professional player
- Jennifer Runyon (born 1960), American actress
- Jennifer Rush (born Heidi Stern in 1960), American pop and rock singer

=== S–Z ===
- Jennifer Saint, British novelist
- Jennifer Sakai, fine art photographer
- Jennifer Salt (born 1944), American producer, screenwriter, and former actress
- Jennifer San Marco, American criminal (1961–2006)
- Jenifer Santos (born 1989), Brazilian Paralympic athlete
- Jennifer Saunders (born 1958), English actress, comedian and screenwriter
- Jennifer Savidge, American actress
- Jennifer Şebnem Schaefer (born 1984), German fashion model, actress and TV presenter
- Jennifer Schultz, American politician
- Jennifer Sevilla (born 1974), Filipino actress
- Jennifer Shahade (born 1980), American chess player, poker player, commentator and writer
- Jennifer Simard (born 1970), American actress
- Jennifer Sky, American actress
- Jennifer Smith (born 1982), American former basketball player
- Jennifer Smith, American politician
- Jennifer Smith (born 1972), American marine ecologist and coral reef expert
- Jennifer Smith, Scottish sociolinguist
- Jennifer Smith (born 1945), Portuguese soprano
- Jennifer E. Smith (author) (born 1980), American author of young adult novels
- Jennifer Elaine Smith, behavioural ecologist and evolutionary biologist
- Jennifer Meredith Smith (born 1947), Bermudan politician
- Jennifer Schwalbach Smith, American actress, podcaster and former reporter
- Jennifer Soileau (born 1975), American soccer player
- Jenifer Solidade (born 1984), Cape Verdean singer
- Jennifer Soto (born 1996), American skateboarder
- Jennifer Speake (born 1944), Canadian-British freelance writer and editor
- Jennifer Spence (born 1977), Canadian actress
- Jennifer Stefano, American executive and activist
- Jennifer Sterger (born 1983), American model, television personality, and former online columnist
- Jennifer Stone (born 1993), American nurse and former actress
- Jennifer K. Stuller (born 1975), American writer, editor, popular culture critic, and historian
- Jennifer Sung (born 1972), American judge
- Jennifer Syme (1972–2001), American actress, personal assistant, and record company executive
- Jennifer Taub, American law professor, advocate, and commentator
- Jennifer Evelyn Taylor (née Bogle; 1935–2015), Australian architect, professor, critic and author
- Jennifer Taylor (born 1949), British romance novelist
- Jennifer Taylor (née Bini; born 1972), American actress
- Jennifer Taylor (born 1976), Argentinean alpine skier and Olympian
- Jennifer Taylor (born 1980), English volleyball player and Olympian
- Jennifer Taylor, American actress
- Jennifer Teague (1987–2005), Canadian murder victim
- Jennifer Teege (born 1970), German writer
- Jennifer Anne Thomas, British physicist
- Jennifer Thompson (born 1938), New Zealand former discus thrower and Olympian
- Jennifer Beth Thompson (born 1973), American former competition swimmer, Olympian, and anesthesiologist
- Jennifer Laura Thompson (born 1969), American actress and singer,
- Jennifer Tilly (born 1958), American-Canadian actress and poker player
- Jennifer Tisdale (born 1981), American singer and actress
- Jennifer Todd (born 1969), American film and television producer
- Jennifer Tonge, Baroness Tonge (born 1941), British politician
- Jennifer Toombs (1940–2018), British graphic artist, stamp designer
- Jennifer Gillian Toomey (born 1968), American indie rock musician and arts activist
- Jennifer Toomey (born 1971), American middle-distance runner
- Jennifer Trusted (1925–2017), British philosopher
- Jennifer Trynin (born 1963), American singer-songwriter and author
- Jennifer Tse (born 1982), Hong Kong actress
- Jennifer Turner, American singer-songwriter, musician and producer
- Jennifer Uchendu (born 1992), Nigerian climate advocate and sustainability expert
- Jennifer Uglow (née Crowther; born 1947), English biographer, historian, critic and publisher
- Jennifer Ulrich (born 1984), German actress
- Jennifer Valentyne (née Peck, born 1967), Canadian television personality
- Jennifer Vanderpool, American artist
- Jennifer Veal (born 1991), English actress and internet personality
- Jennifer Walcott (born 1977), American glamour model and actress
- Jennifer Warnes (born 1947), American singer-songwriter
- Jennifer Warren (born 1941), American actress, producer and film director
- Jenifer Wayne (1917–1982), British writer
- Jennifer Wayne (born 1982), American singer, songwriter, television personality, actress, and businesswoman
- Jennifer Weiner (born 1970), American writer, television producer, and journalist
- Jennifer Welles (1937–2018), American former pornographic actress
- Jennifer Welsh (born 1965), Canadian academic
- Jennifer Westacott, Australian business executive
- Jennifer Westfeldt (born 1970), American actress, screenwriter, director and producer
- Jennifer Wexton (née Tosini; born 1968), American lawyer and politician
- Jennifer Whalen, Canadian actress and comedian
- Jennifer Whalen (born 1976), American professional downhill mountain bike racer
- Jennifer White (born 1974), American journalist and radio personality
- Jennifer White, American former college women's basketball program head coach
- Jennifer White Holland (born 1988), American politician
- Jennifer White Shah (1943–2023), British actress
- Jennifer White-Johnson, American artist and activist
- Jennifer Whyte, British engineer
- Jenifer Widjaja (born 1986), Brazilian professional tennis player
- Jennifer Wilbanks (born 1973), American woman who ran away from home to avoid her planned 2005 wedding
- Jennifer Williamson (born 1973), American attorney, Democratic politician, and political strategist
- Jennifer Wilson (born 1979), South African field hockey coach and former player
- Jennifer Wilson (born 1966), American soprano
- Jennifer Wilson, American roller derby skater professionally known as Hydra
- Jennifer P. Wilson (born 1975), American judge
- Jennifer Wenda Wilson (1932–2022), English actress
- Jennifer Winget (born 1985), Indian actress
- Jenifer K. Wofford, American contemporary artist
- Jennifer Worth (1935–2011), British nurse and author
- Jennifer Wright (born 1986), American author
- Jennifer Yu (born 1993), Hong Kong actress, singer, and model
- Jennifer Yu (born 2002), American chess woman grandmaster
- Jennifer Zamparelli (née Maguire; born 1980), Irish comedian and television presenter
- Jennifer Ziegler, American author

== Fictional characters ==
- Jennifer Aldridge, character on the British soap opera The Archers
- Jennifer "JJ" Jareau, on the CBS/Paramount+ crime drama Criminal Minds
- Jennifer Starkey (Animalia), Marvel Comics character
- Jennifer Stavros (Roulette), Marvel Comics character
- Jennifer Kale, a character in Marvel Comics
- Jennifer Pierce (Lightning), DC Comics superhero

== See also ==
- Jennifer (disambiguation)
- Jen
- Jenn
- Jenna
- Jenni
- Jennie (given name)
- Jenny (given name)
- Yennefer
- Society for Preventing Parents from Naming Their Children Jennifer
