= Jennifer Smith =

Jennifer or Jenny Smith may refer to:

- Jennifer Smith (basketball) (born 1982), American basketball player
- Jennifer Smith (General Hospital), a character on the American soap opera, General Hospital
- Jennifer Smith (sociolinguist), Scottish professor
- Jennifer Smith (Iowa politician)
- Jennifer Smith (soprano) (born 1945), Portuguese soprano
- Jennifer E. Smith (author) (born 1980), American author
- Jennifer Smith (scientist) (born 1972), marine ecologist
- Jennifer E. Smith (biologist), American behavioral ecologist and evolutionary biologist
- Jennifer M. Smith (born 1947), former premier of Bermuda
- Jennifer Schwalbach Smith (born 1971), American actress and wife of Kevin Smith
- Jenny Smith (gymnast) (born 1980), Australian Olympic gymnast
- Jenny Lee Smith (born 1948), English golfer
- Jenny Smith (footballer) (born 2002), Scottish footballer
- Jennifer Smith, who played Lavender Brown in the Harry Potter films

== See also ==
- Jenn Smith (born 1998), Canadian curler
- Jenna Smith (born 1988), American basketball player
