= Poskitt =

Poskitt is a surname.

== People ==
Notable people with the surname include:

- Henry Poskitt (1888–1950), English prelate
- Jenny Poskitt, New Zealand professor of education
- Kjartan Poskitt (born 1956), British writer and TV presenter
- Marcus Poskitt (born 2000), Irish cricketer
