= Wonder Women! The Untold Story of American Superheroines =

- Directed by: Kristy Guevara-Flanagan
- Produced by: Kelcey Edwards
- Cinematography: Gabriel Miller
- Music by: Jimmy Lavalle
- Distributed by: Phase 4 Films
- Release date: March 10, 2012
- Running time: 79 minutes
- Country: United States
- Language: English

Wonder Women! The Untold Story of American Superheroines is a 2012 documentary film exploring the concept of heroic women from the birth of the superhero in the 1940s to the TV and big screen action blockbusters of today.

== Cast ==
- Lynda Carter
- Jane Espenson
- Kathleen Hanna
- L.S. Kim
- Shelby Knox
- Carmela Lane
- Mike Madrid
- Andy Mangels
- Katie Pineda
- Trina Robbins
- Gloria Steinem
- Jennifer K. Stuller
- Lindsay Wagner
