= Jennifer White =

Jennifer White or Jennifer Whyte may refer to:

== Actresses ==
- Jennifer White (pornographic film actress), American pornographic film actress
- Jennifer White Shah (1943–2023), British actress and businesswoman

== Sportspeople ==
- Jennifer White (basketball), American university basketball coach
- Jenny White (racing driver) in 2009 ASA Midwest Tour season
- Jennifer White (runner) in 1979 IAAF World Cross Country Championships

== Others ==
- Jenny White (academic); see Turkish Studies Association
- Jenn White (born 1974 or 1975), American journalist and radio host
- Jennifer White Holland (born 1988), American politician
- Jennifer Whyte, British civil engineer
