= Jennifer Bendery =

American journalist

Jennifer Lee Bendery
- Education: University of Mary Washington (BA); San Francisco State University (MA)
- Occupation: Journalist
- Writing career
- Years active: 2007–current
- Subject: Capitol Hill
- Website: Jennifer Bendery on X

Jennifer Lee Bendery is an American political journalist whose focus has been on Capitol Hill and the White House, including coverage of U.S. policy regarding women and minorities – particularly Savanna's Act and the Violence Against Women Act.

== Career ==
From 1996 to 1998, Bendery was Health Care Policy Reporter for Manisses Communications Group in Providence, Rhode Island. From 1999 to 2002, she was the marketing and promotions manager in San Francisco for the Religion and Nonprofit book series at Jossey-Bass/John Wiley & Sons. From 2003 to 2007, she covered the Texas Legislature for GalleryWatch, (Note: GalleryWatch is a legislative bill- and document-tracking service operated by Roll Call Group, publisher of Roll Call. The Roll Call Group is a subsidiary of The Economist Group. ("Roll Call")) Austin Bureau. During that period, Bendery, in 2005, completed an M.A. degree in English literature at San Francisco State University. From 2007 to 2011, she was a Congressional and White House staff reporter for Roll Call. Since 2011, Bendery has written for the HuffPost, where she is currently Senior Politics Reporter.

== Selected articles ==
- January 29, 2020, Bendery authored a story in the HuffPost that included a list of U.S. House and Senate members who had tested positive for COVID-19.
- April 20, 2021, Bendery broke the story in the HuffPost that Congressman Jeff Fortenberry made emergency calls to the U.S. Capitol Police to test response time. The exercise roused the ire of Capitol Police personnel.

== Bendery's subjects ==
- Affirmative action
- Discrimination
- Employment Non-Discrimination Act
- Gender inequality
- LGBTQ rights
- Paycheck Fairness Act
- Racial inequality
- Savanna's Act
- United States federal judges
- Violence Against Women Act

Bendery has authored articles criticizing aspects of the following:

- Alliance Defending Freedom
- Center for Security Policy

== Professional affiliations ==
- President, Washington Press Club Foundation. Bendery has been a member of the foundation for twelve years, eleven months (since September 2013). She served as president for two terms, co-chair of the Congressional Dinner committee for two years and Vice President for two years.
- Player, Congressional Women's Softball Game. Bendery is a longtime participant in the annual charity softball game between members of the United States Congress and female journalists.

== Family ==
Bendery is the niece of journalist Robert Bassett Whitcomb, Jr. (born 1947) of The Providence Journal.

== Bibliography ==
=== References ===
- "Bendery, Jennifer". Marquis Who's Who (accessible online via the Gale Group). OCLC 4780417245 (bio summary).
1. Who's Who in America, 66th ed., Vol. 1 of 2 (2011). OCLC 761327064.
2. Who's Who in America, 67th ed., Vol. 1 of 2 (2012). OCLC 843199509.
3. Who's Who in the East, 41st ed. (2013). OCLC 923881127.
- Bernstein, Jonathan (December 30, 2020). "Why Would Biden Put a Republican in His Cabinet?". Politics & Policy. Bloomberg News.
- Commencement Program (May 11, 1996). "Jennifer L. Bendery". Eighty-Fifth Commencement. Fredericksburg, Virginia: Mary Washington College. p. 25 – via Internet Archive.
- "Roll Call". Encyclopædia Britannica (online). Encyclopædia Britannica, Inc. n.d (article added to Britannica's online database July 20, 1998)
- "Whitcomb, Robert Bassett". Who's Who in America (53rd ed.). Marquis Who's Who. 1999 – via Internet Archive. Vol. 2 of 3; p. 4751 OCLC 4779335634 (bio summary).

=== References authored by Bendery ===
- Bendery, Jennifer (April 26, 2012). "Violence Against Women Act Reauthorization Overwhelmingly Passes Senate". 2012 renewal coverage. HuffPost.
- Bendery, Jennifer (September 21, 2020). "Congress Finally Passes Bill to Address Missing and Murdered Indigenous Women – Native American Women Are Disappearing and Being Killed – Savanna's Act Will Help Bring Them Some Justice". Politics. HuffPost.
- Bendery, Jennifer (January 29, 2021). "All the Members of Congress Who Have Tested Positive For COVID-19 – More Than 60 House and Senate Lawmakers Have Been Diagnosed With the Deadly Virus". Corona Virus. HuffPost.
- Bendery, Jennifer (April 20, 2021). "GOP Congressman Made Emergency Calls to Police Just to See How Quickly They'd Come". HuffPost
