= Society for Preventing Parents from Naming Their Children Jennifer =

Satirical website

The Society for Preventing Parents from Naming Their Children Jennifer (SPPNTCJ) was a popular and sometimes controversial website that contributed to early web culture, online from 1996 to 2000. The SPPNTCJ home page was created and updated by Jennifer Farwell, one of the three founding members of the SPPNTCJ. Other founding members were Jennifer Rich and Jennifer Ang.

== Background ==
The SPPNTCJ began as an inside joke on an email discussion list that both Farwell and Rich subscribed to, which included five or more people named Jennifer who actively posted at that time. One of the Jennifers tossed out the comment that there should be "a society for preventing parents from naming their children Jennifer." The idea took off, and Farwell created the SPPNTCJ's website. It welcomed more than 2 million visitors while online.

During its run, the SPPNTCJ was noted by the Richmond Times-Dispatch, Yahoo! Internet Life magazine, Thunder Bay Television News, 580 CKPR radio program Tech Talk, California State University, Chico, SignsOnSanDiego.com, WebMD and more. It received several Internet "cool site" acknowledgments, from Cool Central, Seven Wonders, Twoeys, Fallen Thinkers, and Secret Einstein.
