= Jennifer Lee (scientist) =

British Antarctic environmentalist

- Education: Stellenbosch University
- Awards: Scientific Committee on Antarctic Research Fellowship
- Scientific career
- Fields: Invasion Biology
- Workplaces: Government of South Georgia and the South Sandwich Islands

Jennifer Lee is an Antarctic researcher, best known for her work on invasion biology. She is the Environment Officer in the Government of South Georgia and the South Sandwich Islands.

== Early life and education ==
Lee grew up in the Peak District of Derbyshire, UK. She received her PhD from the Centre for Invasion Biology, Stellenbosch University, South Africa. She then worked as a post-doctoral fellow at the Centre for Invasion Biology, Stellenbosch University.

== Career and impact ==
Lee is an ecologist and has focused on Antarctic and sub-Antarctic systems since 2006. Lee has diverse interests including invasion biology, population genetics, species distribution modelling and invertebrate physiology. Her research on alien species in Antarctica influenced global thinking about the risks posed by the increased presence of alien vegetation due to Antarctic tourism and Antarctic research teams.

Lee has completed several field seasons on Marion Island and three field seasons in the Antarctic; for two of these Antarctic field seasons she was the field operator, making her the first woman field operator for the South African National Antarctic Programme (SANAP). She was also the second woman Chief Scientist for land based science during a field season to Marion Island.

Lee moved to the Falkland Islands to begin work as the Environment Officer in the Government of South Georgia and the South Sandwich Islands in early 2012. She is works on projects to eradicate non-native plants and animals (including rats and reindeer) from South Georgia, and then monitors ecosystem recovery after removal of these pest species. She uses her research to help inform management decisions.

== Awards and honours ==
Lee was the first scientist from a South African Institute to be awarded a highly competitive Scientific Committee on Antarctic Research (SCAR) fellowship.

== Selected works ==
- Lee, J.E. and Chown, S.L., 2009. Temporal development of hull-fouling assemblages associated with an Antarctic supply vessel. Marine Ecology Progress Series, 386, pp. 97–105.
- Lee, Jennifer E., and Steven L. Chown. "Breaching the dispersal barrier to invasion: quantification and management." Ecological Applications 19.7 (2009): 1944-1959.
- Lee, J.E. and Chown, S.L., 2009. Quantifying the propagule load associated with the construction of an Antarctic research station. Antarctic Science,21(05), pp. 471–475.
- Chown, S.L., Huiskes, A.H., Gremmen, N.J., Lee, J.E., Terauds, A., Crosbie, K., Frenot, Y., Hughes, K.A., Imura, S., Kiefer, K. and Lebouvier, M., 2012. Continent-wide risk assessment for the establishment of nonindigenous species in Antarctica. Proceedings of the National Academy of Sciences,109(13), pp. 4938–4943.
- Huiskes, A.H., Gremmen, N.J., Bergstrom, D.M., Frenot, Y., Hughes, K.A., Imura, S., Kiefer, K., Lebouvier, M., Lee, J.E., Tsujimoto, M. and Ware, C., 2014. Aliens in Antarctica: assessing transfer of plant propagules by human visitors to reduce invasion risk. Biological conservation, 171, pp. 278–284.
