= Jennifer Gommerman =

Canadian immunologist

- Born: Winnipeg, Manitoba

Academic background
- Education: BSc, 1993, PhD, immunology, 1998, University of Toronto
- Thesis: An analysis of steel factor-stimulated receptor trafficking, survival signals and mitogenesis: understanding the role of c-Kit-associated signaling proteins (2000)

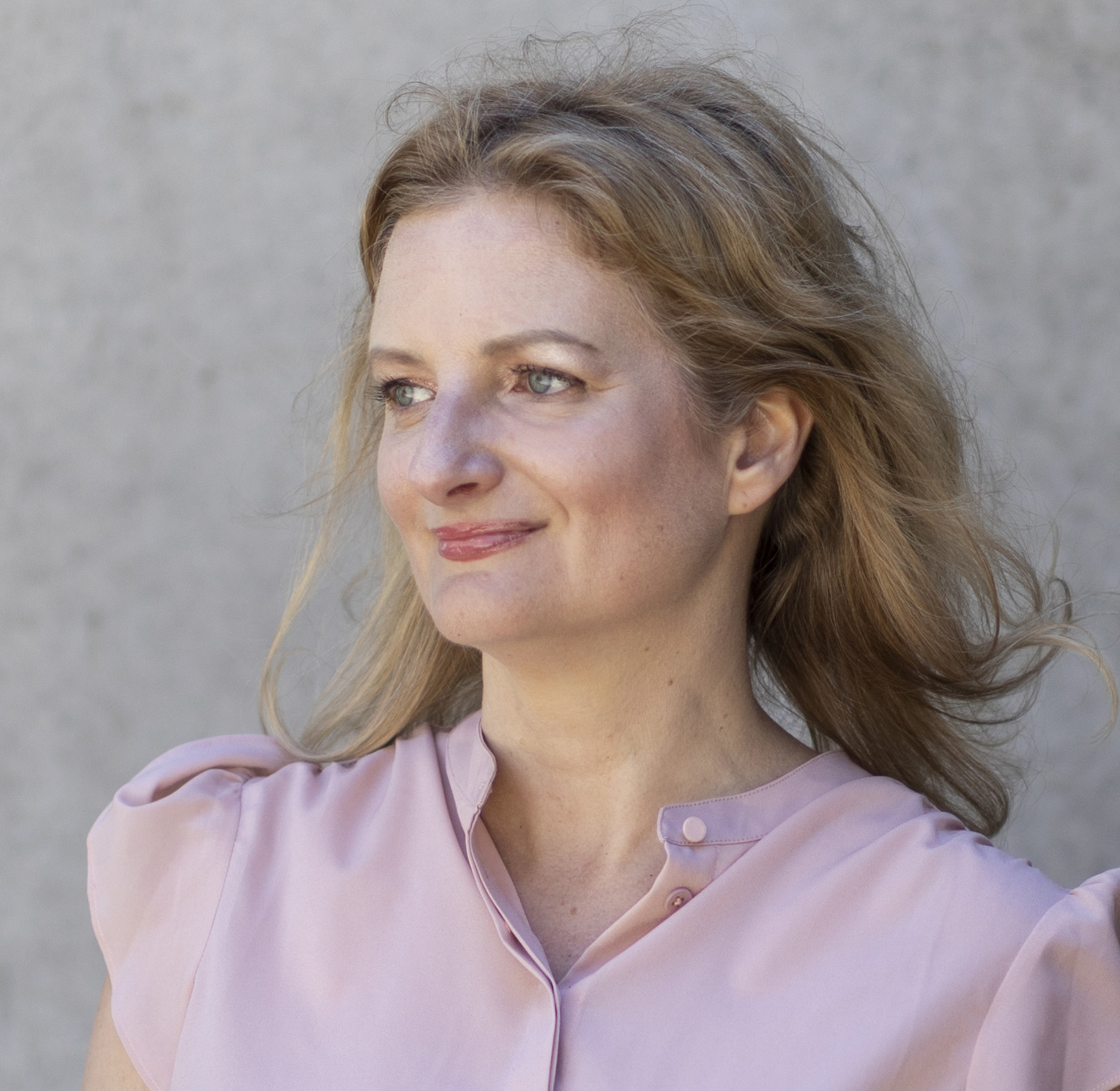
Jen Gommerman, 2020

Jennifer Lynn Gommerman is a Canadian immunologist. She is a Tier 1 Canada Research Chair in Tissue-Specific Immunity at the University of Toronto. Gommerman has been examining the role of B lymphocytes in Multiple Sclerosis patients and in animal models of MS. She also studies the antibody response to SARS-CoV-2 in saliva samples from patients with COVID-19.

== Early life and education ==
Gommerman was born in Winnipeg, Manitoba but her family moved to Burlington, Ontario when she was 10 years old. Growing up in Burlington, she attended Ecole St. Philippe and then Lester B. Pearson High School before enrolling at the University of Toronto (U of T). She subsequently earned her Bachelor of Science degree and Ph.D. in immunology at U of T before completing a post-doctoral fellowship at Harvard Medical School.

== Career ==
Following her post-doctoral fellowship, Gommerman became a staff scientist at Biogen Inc for three years before returning to U of T in 2003 as an assistant professor of immunology. She intended to continue her work with multiple sclerosis (MS) but eventually broadened her research to include the impact of the mucosal immune system in the gut on diseases such as MS. In 2007, Gommerman received an Early Researcher Award to support her efforts in uncovering the basic set of biological events common to MS and other chronic diseases. In 2014, Gommerman began investigating chronic inflammatory diseases in South Asian immigrants raised in Canada using funding from the Global Challenge Prize. Her research project was entitled the GEMINI Study (Generational differences in Environmental exposures caused by Human Migration: Impact on Incidence of Inflammatory Disease). At the same time, she also assumed the role of graduate coordinator and was promoted to the rank of full professor.

As a full professor, Gommerman continued examining the role of B lymphocytes in Multiple Sclerosis patients. In 2019, in collaborating with researchers at UC San Francisco, Gommerman discovered that the intestine is the source of immune cells that reduce brain inflammation in people with multiple sclerosis. As such, increasing the number of these cells blocks inflammation entirely in a preclinical model of the disease. She also began using non-traditional methods to detect dozens of proteins in a single tissue section. She used imaging mass cytometry to study the immune cells found in brain lesions of MS patients. In 2020, Gommerman and her post-doctoral researcher Conglei Li discovered that in utero inhibition of molecular signalling in the guts of mice can compromise immunity in adulthood. This early disruption limits the ability of the immune system to later trigger and generate Immunoglobulin A (IgA) antibodies. It also interferes with the nature and function of cells in the gut that support the antibody response.

Early in the COVID-19 pandemic, Gommerman helped with developing a blood test to identify who is immune to the novel virus on a mass scale. She helped supply samples from pre-pandemic subjects as well as patients infected early in the pandemic who have since recovered. She was also appointed a Tier 1 Canada Research Chair in Tissue-Specific Immunity at U of T. She continued to lead saliva testing efforts in this new role and worked with a research team which found that coronavirus antibodies could last at least three months after a person becomes infected with the virus. She also helped organize and lead the Coronavirus Variants Rapid Response Network for research on COVID-19 variants. Beyond COVID-19, Gommerman continued her research into MS and used funding from the Multiple Sclerosis Society of Canada to investigate on the interplay between the complement system and glial cells in the hippocampus. The purpose of this project was to determine the changes that occur in the brains of people with progressive MS and how it correlates with clinical disability.
