= Jennifer Ouellette (milliner) =

American fashion designer

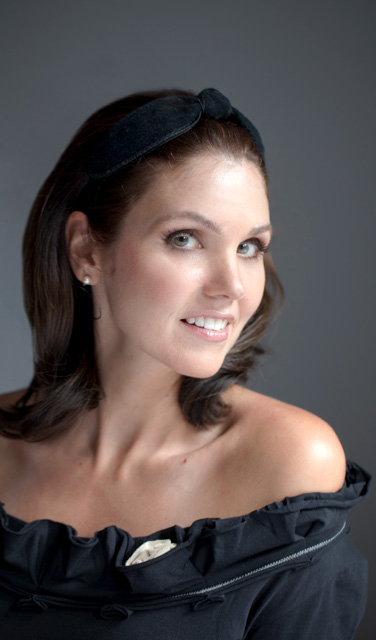
- Jennifer Ouellette in a felt turban of her own design
- Born: St. Louis, Missouri
- Education: Kirkwood High School; University of Missouri; London College of Fashion
- Occupation: fashion designer

Jennifer Ouellette is a milliner based in New York City and Santiago de los Caballeros. She designs hats for both men and women, in addition to headbands and other hair accessories for the "everyday modern girl." Ouellette's headbands and hair accessories are distinctive in that traditional millinery techniques are used to ensure a comfortable and secure fit.

== Early life and education ==
Born in St. Louis, Missouri, Ouellette developed her appreciation for fashion and millinery at her mother's vintage clothing store where she was exposed to historic and classic lines. Her father is an industrial designer with 45 US patents specializing in complex packaging. Ouellette adopted his philosophy of craftsmanship and quality, earning her first utility patent for headband construction in 1999.

After graduating from Kirkwood High School in 1989, she went on to study Textile and Apparel Management and Theater Design at the University of Missouri. Thereafter, she attended the London College of Fashion and was an apprentice of the London-based milliner Stephen Jones.

== Business ==
Starting her company in 1996, Ouellette delivered her first official order to Barneys New York in the same year. Her work has since been featured in Vogue, Elle, Marie Claire, T Magazine, People, and Women's Wear Daily, among others. She designed the headdress and handbag for Sarah Jessica Parker's 1997 wedding. Other celebrity clients include Penélope Cruz, Gwen Stefani, Angelina Jolie and Britney Spears.

In 2007, Ouellette opened a studio in Hudson Heights, Manhattan. As of 2015, Ouellette's private studio and showroom is located in the Flatiron District of Manhattan. She also has a smaller studio based in Santiago, in the Dominican Republic. Although more expensive than outsourcing to China and India, Ouellette has expressed appreciation for the Dominicans' fine hand-sewing.

== Exhibitions ==
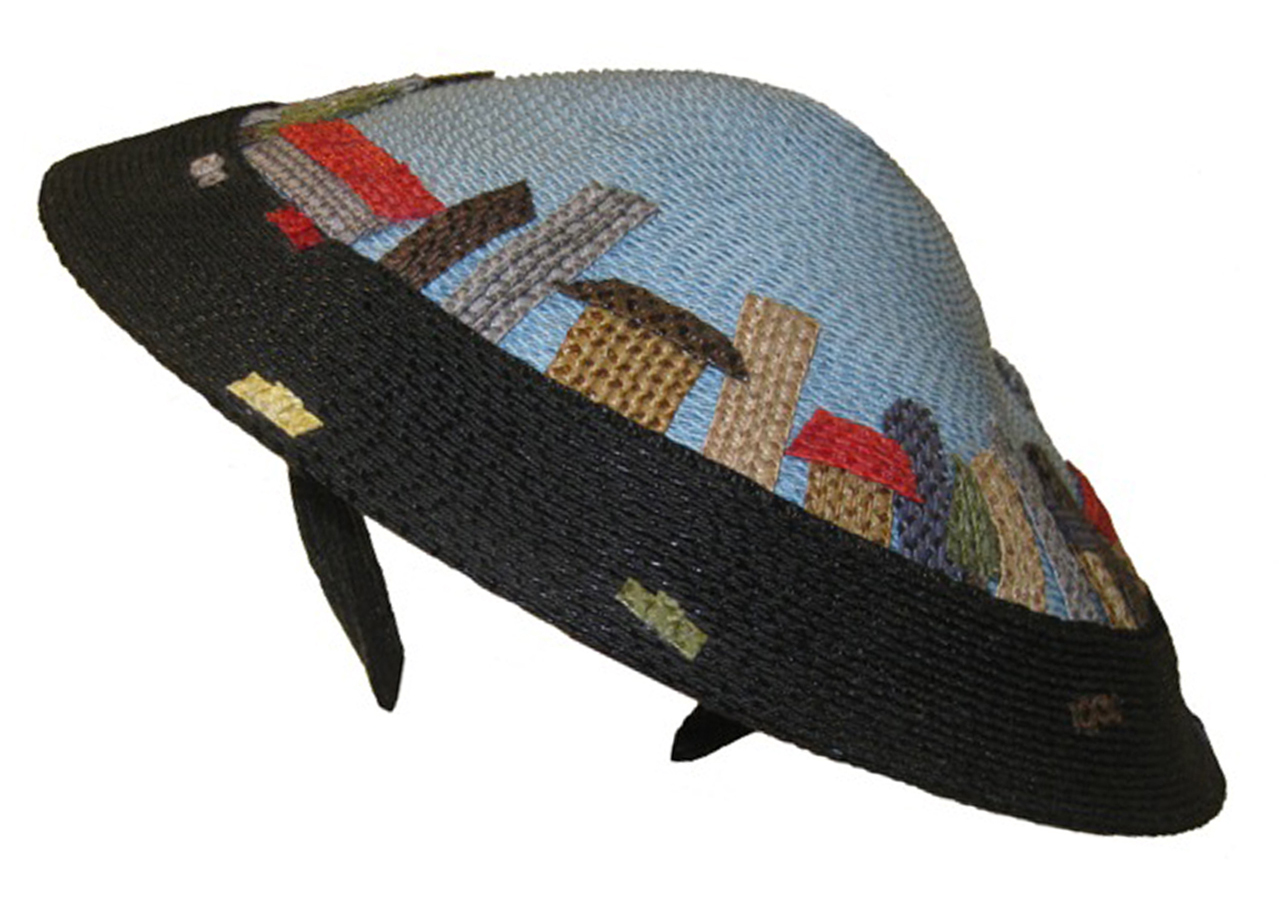
9/11 Tribute Cityscape. Exhibited in Hats: An Anthology, 2012

Ouellette's work was featured in the Victoria and Albert Museum exhibition Hats: an Anthology, curated by Stephen Jones. When the exhibit travelled to the Bard Graduate Center in New York, Ouellette was one of several local milliners (including Rod Keenan and Eugenia Kim) to have millinery designs included in the exhibition. One of her designs in the exhibition featured a straw cityscape applied to a straw pagoda shape on a headband, which she said was in tribute to New York's resilience following the events of 9/11.
