= Jennifer Des =

Belgian photographer

- Born: 11 April 1975 (age 51); Brussels, Belgium
- Occupation: photographer,

Jennifer Des (born 1975) is a Belgian photographer. She is inspired by Francis Bacon in the treatment of the human corpse by manipulating images of plastic surgery.

== Biography ==
Born in Brussels, Des studied at the École de recherche graphique in her hometown. She put into practice her studies in Kinshasa where she worked for six months for the French Community of Belgium. She had her first individual exhibition in 2003 at the galerie Pascal Polar in Brussels. She was selected for the collective exhibition 175 years of Belgium by the Belgian Photography Museum and at the Espace Blanche with Frédéric Beigbeder as her mentor. She exposed with Wim Delvoye and Delphine Boël at the Salle des Beaux Arts du Sablon for the Pierre Bergé – Yves Saint Laurent Foundation in 2007. She made in 2009 an exhibition Les Sangtiments at the Young Gallery with her human body work from pictures made (with special admission) from parts of the human body found in the clinic rooms of hospitals. In 2012 she had her exposition in the SohoPhoto Gallery in New York City. Now Des is working on the high-definition photography of the personalized iris on a cosmic background for the EYE-D project exhibited at the Mercedes House in 2011, at the Top Marques in Monaco in 2014 and at the Café de Paris in Monte Carlo March 2015. In May 2015 at the Park Lenôtre Mougins with Robert Hossein and Jean-Paul Belmondo Invités d'Honneurs. She had an exposition in March 2016 in the Dark Room Galerie with Irina Brook and Soulwax.

== Projects ==
=== EYE-D Project ===
Des creates each of her pieces in relation to the model and the request. In addition to its retinal imprint, the stellar presence highlights the dominant planets. With the help of a professional astrologer, an astral map is made. Des gets her inspiration from this to add extra material to her art. She then integrates it to the eye imprint. Her clients can also have their own portrait, as well as a portrait with their family member's eyes. Human eyes, just like DNA or fingerprints define our unique identity. Much more than a portrait.

=== ETERNITY Vision ===
Jennifer Des redefines her subject's individuality as a planetary center of new cosmic dimensions ready for eternity. As she shot the eyes of her mother, she discovered a new meaning to eternity and what this could represent for us. Jennifer had an exposition at the Gallery Riccadonna Rue Grimaldi in Monaco on the 5th of July with her recent works with the personal support of S.A.S. Le Prince Albert II de Monaco and in Gallery Art Sablon in Brussels in November 2019. Liberté, Egalité, Fraternité. Conférence with participation of the artist Jennifer Des 30 et 31 mai Villa Castrum Romanum dans le cadre de Art MaÇonica Exposition Conférence organised par le grand Orient de France.

=== EXPIRED ===
La Luz de Jesus Gallery in LA Present E X P I R E D by Jennifer DES. The Exhibition will take place on March 6th, 2026 and run through March until the 29th, 2026. Galerie Ferrero in Nice is exposing Expired from 23th November 2026 until 6th December 2026.

== Bibliography ==
- Concept, 2007 (published by Editions Luc Pire – La Renaissance du Livre) ISBN 978-2-87415-804-9
