= Jennifer Freed =

American professor, psychological astrologer and author

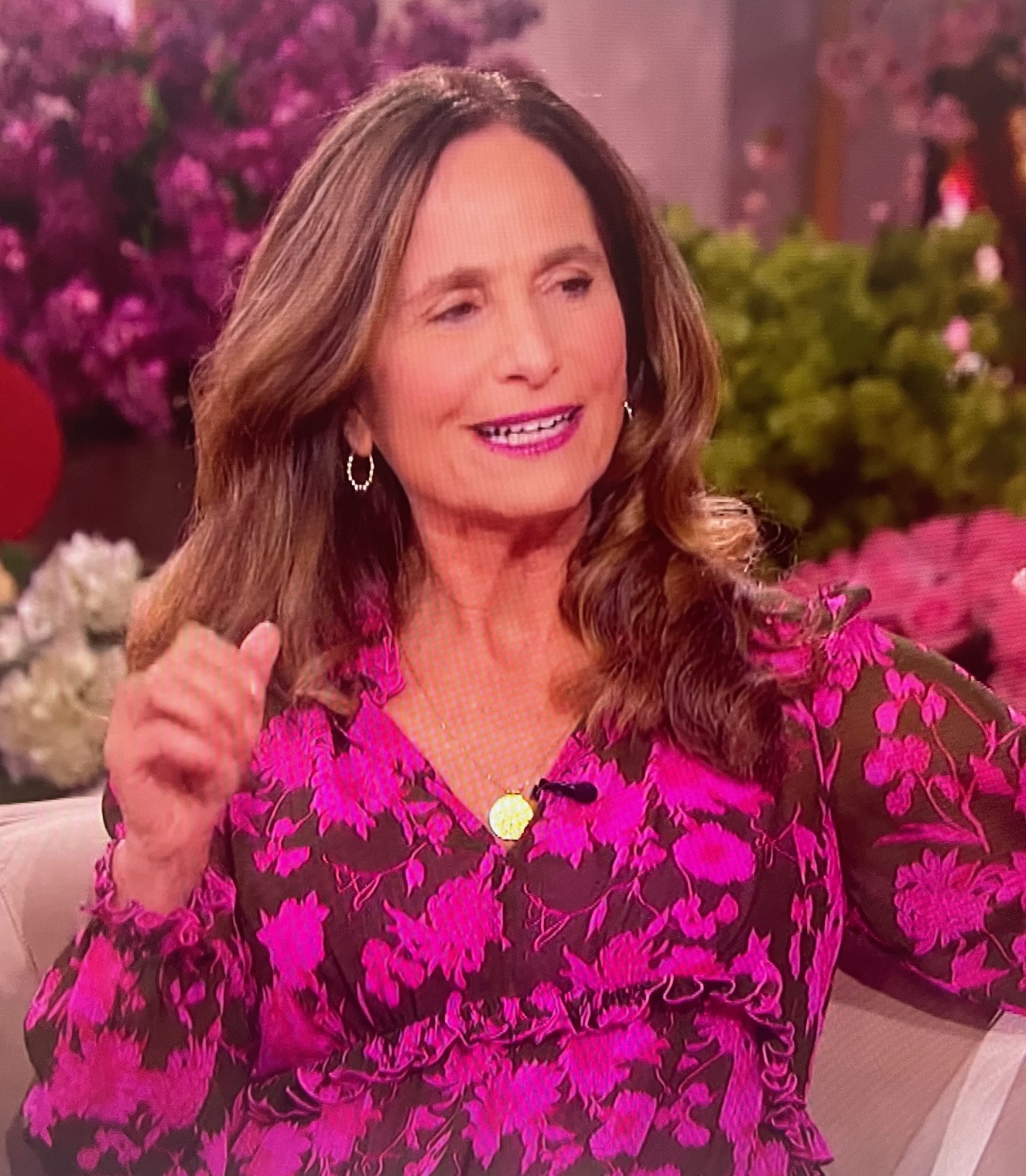
- Born: New York City, U.S.
- Education: UC San Diego, UC Santa Barbara, Antioch University, Pacifica Graduate Institute
- Occupations: professor, psychological astrologer and author
- Website: www.jenniferfreed.com

Jennifer Freed is an American professor, psychological astrologer, and author.

== Early life and education ==
Freed was born in New York City and relocated to Los Angeles during her childhood. Her higher education journey began on the West Coast at UC San Diego before she transferred to UC Santa Barbara, where she earned a degree in Sociology in 1979. She earned a master's degree from Antioch University and later a PhD in Depth Psychology from the Pacifica Graduate Institute.

== Career ==
Freed served as a professor and Clinical Director at Pacifica Graduate Institute. In 1999, together with her partner Rendy Freedman, Freed co-founded AHA! (Attitude, Harmony, and Achievement), a nonprofit dedicated to empowering teens, parents, and educators.

Freed's leadership roles have included serving as State-wide Director for both the Media Project at the Human Relations Institute and Citizens’ Policy Center Youthwork. She has also worked with several public service organizations, including the Santa Barbara Rape Crisis Center, Family Violence Prevention Program, Pacific Pride Foundation, and Florence Crittendon in San Francisco.

As an astrologer, Freed launched international astrological counseling seminars featuring renowned guest teachers such as Dana Gerhardt, Rick Tarnas, Caroline Casey, and Darby Costello.

She consulted in the early stages of the astrology app CO STAR and helped develop a relationship segment and mental health resource for the international astrology company Nebula. She has been instrumental in developing AI GUIDES, a personal tarot and astrology reader designed to offer everyday inspiration.

In 2025, Freed was featured in several media outlets discussing the intersections of astrology, psychology, and personal development. She was profiled by the Montecito Journal for her community work, interviewed by Today on the relevance of astrology in modern life and consulted by Cosmopolitan on astrology-inspired beauty trends. She also appeared on the Awaken Your Purpose podcast to discuss astrology as a tool for growth, not fate.

=== Writing ===
Freed has penned 10 books, notable among them include Lessons from Stanley the Cat, Use Your Planets Wisely, and A Map to Your Soul. She also published The Ultimate Personality Guide, an interactive resource for understanding personality typologies, Beyond Aquarius and has contributed numerous articles to notable outlets like Goop and Maria Shriver.

== Awards ==
In 2009, Freed received the Santa Barbara Local Heroes Award and The Hope Award from Sierra Tucson Treatment Center for creating an innovative curriculum for high school students which led to a 75% reduction in school suspensions.
