= Jennifer S. Lund =

English scientist (1940–2025)

Jennifer S. Lund (28 July 1940 - 18 July 2025) was a distinguished anatomist who provided insight and research to the organization of feedforward and feedback circuits in the neocortex, observed the pruning of dendritic spines in the primate visual system, and helped describe the patterns of lateral connectivity in the cerebral cortex.

== Early life ==
Jennifer S. Lund was born July 28, 1940, in Birmingham, England. Her parents were artists, and both of her siblings worked in the arts, so therefore her interest in science was new to the family. Initially, Jennifer found herself drawn to botany, but studies in that subject were discouraged at the time. Ultimately the mystery of biology and zoology led her towards a career in neuroscience.

== Education ==
Jennifer began her academic career by earning a bachelor's degree in zoology at University College, London. Following this achievement, she began a year-long position working as a technical assistant to Jack Downer's research lab in the anatomy department at University College. She then began her Ph.D. in neuroscience in the same lab, working for John Zachary Young. After traveling with her husband to the United States for better more job opportunities, she began a Post-Doctoral Fellowship at the University of Pennsylvania with William Chambers at their institute of Neurological Sciences. Jennifer then followed this experience with a second Post-Doctoral Fellowship with Peter Ralston at Stanford University, and began studying corpus callosum.

== Personal life ==
Jennifer Lund met her husband in Jack Downer’s laboratory when he wittily insulted her glass washing skills. Raymond Lund balanced the act of husband and scientific mentor. While working in Seattle in the mid-70s, Jennifer gave birth to two sons. She was able to manage raising her children while working on her research. Jennifer Lund died on 18 July 2025 in Astoria, Oregon.

== Research ==
Jennifer Lund's first research project started right out of the lab she first worked for. This research was with split-brain monkeys, examining the phenomenon of interhemispheric transfer of visual memory. After her first year as a technician she became a Ph.D. student and this led to the idea of determining if monkeys who were split-brain could retain compensation when the vision was switched between the eyes to the side of a brain lacking the experience. After completing her thesis, her husband and she moved to the University of Pennsylvania where they found new jobs in the neuroscience department. After a year the two traveled to Seattle for a position at the University of Washington for 11 years. Lund went on to study the visual cortex in the primate visual system, as this remained her primary study for the rest of her career. After a period of time in Charleston at the Medical University of South Carolina, in 1983, Raymond Lund took a chair position at the University of Pittsburgh. Here she became a Professor of Psychiatry, Professor of Neurology, Professor of Ophthalmology, and Professor of Anatomy. Her last career move before retiring was working at the University of Utah for their Ophthalmology and Visual Sciences.

== Honors ==
Jennifer S. Lund held many positions throughout her career. She was a Fellow of the Academy of Medical Sciences and served on the Scientific Advisory Board for England’s Medical Research Council (United Kingdom). She has served as Chair of the Program Committee and Treasurer for the USA Society for Neuroscience, and Executive Secretary for International Brain Research Organization (IBRO). She was also the Secretary-General of IBRO. She won the Krieg Cortical Discoverer Medal in 1992 for her work in investigating the cerebral cortex and its connections.
