= Jennifer C. McIntosh =

American hydrogeologist

Jennifer McIntosh
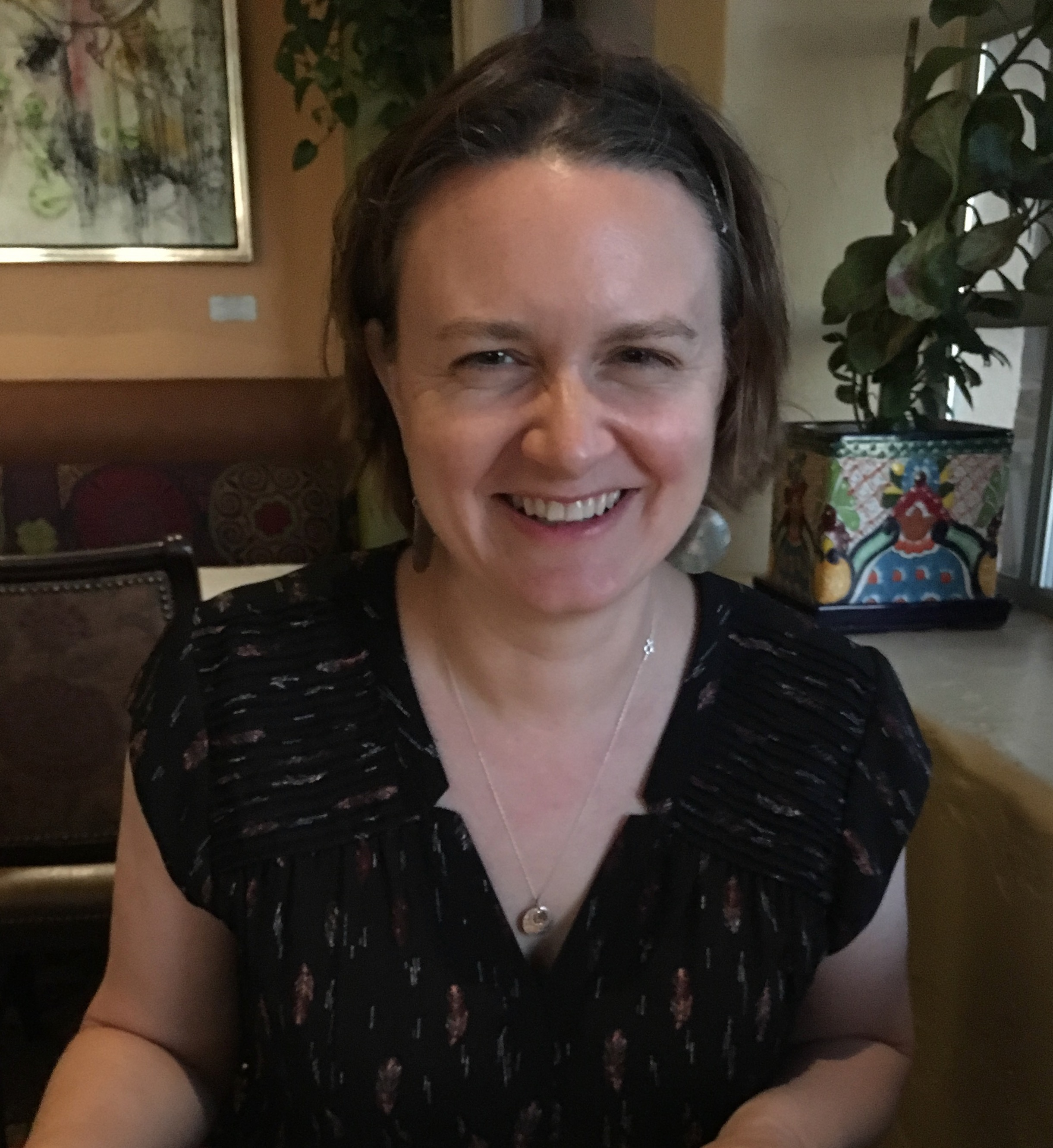
- Citizenship: United States
- Awards: Geological Society of America Fellow (2019), University Distinguished Scholar at the University of Arizona
- Scientific career
- Fields: Hydrology, Hydrogeochemistry, Paleohydrology
- Institutions: University of Arizona

Jennifer McIntosh is a hydrogeologist and professor of hydrology and atmospheric sciences at the University of Arizona, where she is a University Distinguished Scholar. In 2019, she was named a Geological Society of America Fellow.

== Early life and education ==
Jennifer McIntosh first developed her interest in science during her childhood with family trips from her home near Seattle to Olympic National Park and the Cascade Mountains. In college, a family trip to Yellowstone National Park inspired her interest in the physical, chemical, geological, and biological processes of deep subsurface groundwater.

McIntosh pursued these interests in her higher education by completing her undergraduate studies at Whitman College. McIntosh graduated from Whitman with a B.S. in geology - chemistry. She continued her education at University of Michigan in Ann Arbor, where she earned her M.S. and PhD in geology.

== Career and research ==
After earning her PhD, McIntosh completed her post-doc in earth and planetary sciences at Johns Hopkins University through the Jane Blaustein Postdoctoral Fellowship. McIntosh began her career in academia at the University of Arizona in 2006. McIntosh also served as an adjunct research geologist from 2007–2017 for the United States Geological Survey.

As an associate professor of earth and atmospheric sciences at University of Arizona and an adjunct professor at the University of Saskatchewan, McIntosh has earned recognition for her research, curriculum, and mentorship of her undergraduate and graduate students.

McIntosh is known for her study of topics related to geochemical processes for surface water, ground water, and natural gas. McIntosh conducts multidisciplinary research that integrates hydrology, geochemistry, and microbiology to better understand the fate and transport of fluids beneath the Earth's surface. In subsurface environments, McIntosh studies both deep-subsurface and near-surface environments, as well as the physical interactions between the two.

=== Publications ===
McIntosh is the primary author or a coauthor of over 65 peer-reviewed journal publications and has an h-index of 33. Journals featuring her research include Science, Environmental Science and Technology, Groundwater, Chemical Geology, and Journal of Hydrology.

McIntosh's paper, “Competition for Shrinking Window of Low Salinity Groundwater,” an article published in 2018 in Environmental Research Letters, attracted national attention with new findings about the limitations for the United States's supply of fresh groundwater. The paper maps the depths of separation between fresh and brackish groundwater for 28 sedimentary basins and discusses how this essential resource is being depleted at an alarming rate. Its conclusion that less fresh groundwater is available than previously estimated has initiated increased awareness about fresh groundwater security.

== Awards and honors ==
In 2019, McIntosh was named a Fellow of the Geological Society of America. At the University of Arizona, McIntosh was awarded the 2017 University Distinguished Scholar award for her scientific contributions toward teaching and public outreach.

In 2011, the United States Geological Survey (USGS) awarded McIntosh the STAR Award for her research contributions. She also received the "Best Paper Award" for her publication in Geofluids titled, “Impacts of Pleistocene glaciation on large-scale groundwater flow and salinity in the Michigan Basin”.

For her contributions as a professor, McIntosh has been recognized with multiple awards for the curriculum and classes she has contributed to both the Hydrologic and Atmospheric Sciences Department and the Geosciences department at University of Arizona. In 2019, McIntosh was awarded the Leon and Pauline Blitzer Award for Excellence in Teaching of Physics. McIntosh has also received the “Award for Excellence at the Student Interface” for three years of teaching including 2011, 2013, and 2017.

== Public engagement ==
McIntosh has been commended for her dedication to teaching earth sciences, and has received multiple awards including the student nominated “Award for Excellence at the Student Interface” in 2011, 2013, and 2017. McIntosh is dedicated to enhancing the education of women in STEM. Of the 40 undergraduate and graduate students McInotsh has mentored, more than half are women or underrepresented minorities in STEM.

Due to her knowledge about subsurface systems and their physical interactions, McIntosh also presents at workshops for various public entities, including the United States Technical Review Board, the United Nations Atomic Energy Agency, and the Environmental Protection Agency. McIntosh provided a presentation at the EPA Technical Workshop for the U.S. EPA Hydraulic Fracturing Study in 2015. Her presentation discussed chemical and analytical methods for distinction of subsurface groundwater by comparing the chemical composition of specific isotopes of methane and carbon dioxide. Additionally, McIntosh is an External Advisory Board Member for Energize New Mexico, which is a National Science Foundation funded program designed to stimulate competitive research in STEM fields.

McIntosh has served as an Associate Editor for Water Resources Research since 2013.

== Personal life ==
Jennifer McIntosh has a husband and two children.

McIntosh is dedicated to enriching the lives of her students. An article courtesy of Parent and Family Programs about McIntosh's personal life and career reported:

As any parent will recognize and understand, watching one’s students go on to build successful careers of their own is the “holy grail” of academic life ...Jen remarks that it is her favorite aspect of the job – helping students build their careers, and (hopefully) balance work and life, whether in academia, industry, or in some other field entirely.
