= Jennifer Jajeh =

American actress and writer

- Occupations: Actor, writer

Jennifer Jajeh is a Palestinian-American actress and writer. She was born in Ramallah, before moving to San Francisco at a young age.

== Career ==
Jajeh started performing after studying at the Lee Strasberg Institute in New York City. In 2008, Jajeh wrote a solo performance, I Heart Hamas: And Other Things I'm Afraid to Tell You, where she explored her identity as a Palestinian-American.

Jajeh has written screenplays for the short films Fruition and In My Own Skin, with the latter screening at the Museum of Modern Art in New York City and on PBS. Her work as a producer includes documentaries, narrative film, and video projects.
