= Jennifer Childs-Roshak =

American physician

- Born: 1963 or 1964 (age 61–62)
- Education: Harvard University (BA); Boston University School of Management (MBA); Temple University (MD)
- Occupation: Physician
- Known for: President and CEO of Planned Parenthood League of Massachusetts (2015-2022)
- Spouse: Phillip Roshak
- Children: 2

Jennifer Childs-Roshak is an American physician who was president and chief executive officer (CEO) of Planned Parenthood League of Massachusetts and president of the Planned Parenthood Advocacy Fund of Massachusetts from 2015 to 2022. She has also sat on the board of the Boston Public Health Commission. She was the first person with a medical degree to become the chief executive of any Planned Parenthood.

== Life and education ==
Childs-Roshak grew up in New Hampshire. She attended Harvard University in Cambridge, Massachusetts, and after graduating with a degree in English, moved to New York City to work as an editor for the United Nations Population Fund. While in New York, she began volunteering at a Planned Parenthood facility. She attended medical school at Temple University in Philadelphia. She also has an MBA from the Boston University School of Management.

Childs-Roshak is married to Phillip Roshak. They have two children. She gave birth to her first child while in medical school, and her second while completing her residency at Maine Medical Center Family Practice Center.

== Career ==
In 1993, Childs-Roshak became a primary care physician with a specialty in family medicine. She worked as a faculty physician at Maine Medical Center Family Practice Center, the same center where she completed her medical school residency. She then became the vice president of family services at the Family Health Center of Worcester. She then moved to become the medical director of quality at the Milford Regional Medical Center. In 2012, she joined Harvard Vanguard's internal medicine department as a physician. She later became the medical director of their facilities in Kenmore, Copley, and Post Office Square, under Atrius Health.

On November 23, 2015, Childs-Roshak became the president and CEO of Planned Parenthood League of Massachusetts, and the president of the Planned Parenthood Advocacy Fund of Massachusetts. She was the first person with a medical degree to lead any Planned Parenthood in the United States, having filled the vacancy left by Marty Walz, who resigned from the position in January 2015. In August 2022, Planned Parenthood announced Childs-Roshak would step down from her leadership role by the end of the calendar year. She was succeeded by Ellen Frank, who served as interim president and CEO for the remainder of the fiscal year ending June 30, 2023.
