= Jennifer Chan (musician) =

- Born: United Kingdom
- Occupations: Radio personality; creative director; singer; actor; architect
- Years active: 1980s–2000s

Chinese name
- Traditional Chinese: 陳漢詩
- Simplified Chinese: 陈汉诗
Transcriptions
Standard Mandarin
- Hanyu Pinyin: Chén hànshī
- Musical career
- Genre: Cantopop

Jennifer Chan (born 25 September, year unknown) is a former Hong Kong radio personality, creative director, singer-songwriter, film actress and architect of Chinese and Scottish descent, most active from around the late 1980s to the 2000s.

== Career ==
Chan became a radio personality after entering a 1987 disk jockey competition held by RTHK. Contestants that year included Vivian Chow and Christopher Wong, with whom Chan later co-hosted a number of programmes on Radio 2.

In 1996, Chan released the EP Still Thinking of You, for which she wrote all of the music and lyrics. She had a starring role in the 1999 film Dreamtrips, which was screened at the 23rd Hong Kong International Film Festival.

She currently resides in Paris, France, and is a registered architect after graduating with a master's degree from the École nationale supérieure d'architecture de Paris-Malaquais.

== Discography ==
- 1996: Still Thinking of You (還想你)

== Filmography ==
- Heart to Hearts (1988)
- Dreamtrips (1999)
