= Jennifer Loud =

American nurse practitioner

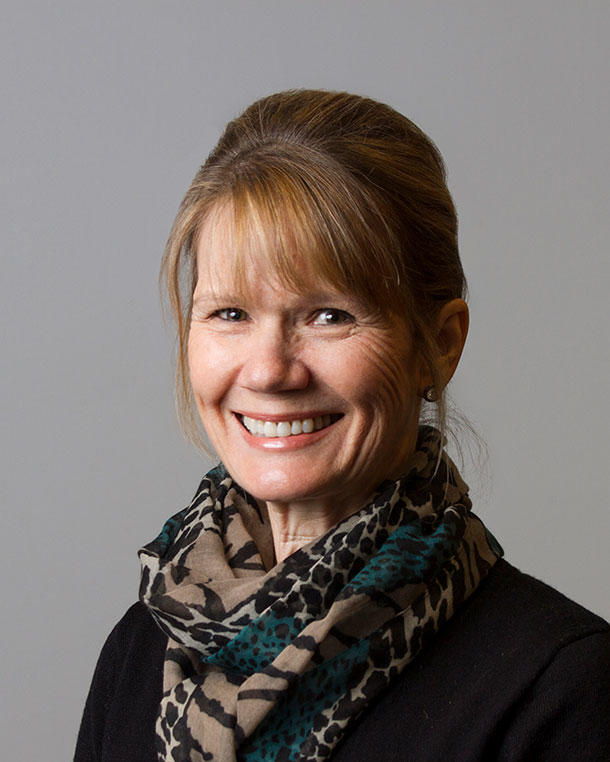
- Loud in 2019
- Education: Old Dominion University; George Mason University; University of Maryland School of Nursing
- Scientific career
- Fields: Nursing, clinical genetics
- Workplaces: National Cancer Institute

Jennifer T. Loud is an American nurse practitioner who served as the assistant chief of the National Cancer Institute's clinical genetics branch until August 2020.

== Life ==
Loud received a B.S. in Nursing from Old Dominion University in 1981, an M.S. in Nursing from George Mason University in 1992, and a Doctor of Nursing Practice degree from the University of Maryland, Baltimore in 2008.

Loud spent seven years as a nurse practitioner with the National Cancer Institute's (NCI) medical oncology branch, working with individuals enrolled in clinical trials of new cancer treatments. During that time, she was a clinical trials coordinator and an associate investigator on two chemoprevention trials for women at increased risk of breast cancer. After joining the NCI division of cancer epidemiology and genetics (DCEG), she earned her doctorate in Nursing Practice from the University of Maryland School of Nursing in 2008, and completed NCI’s year-long Senior Executive Enrichment & Development (STEED) Program in 2009.

In 2008, Loud was appointed assistant chief of the NCI Clinical Genetics Branch. Her involvement with NCI's Clinical Center institutional review board, first as affiliated scientist and then as deputy chair, established Loud as a resource for human subjects research regulatory matters at NCI. She was a contributor to DCEG’s research portfolio on the behavioral and psychosocial effects of cancer risk assessment and prevention procedures on high-risk individuals. As associate investigator, Loud collected detailed behavioral and psychosocial data to assess the impact of rigorous screening programs on mental health and overall well-being. Loud also played a large role as associate investigator of the Li-Fraumeni Syndrome Study, focused on protecting the privacy of study participants on families as outlined with ethical protocols by the Institutional Review Board (IRB).

Dr. Jennifer Loud retired in August 2020 after 27 years of service to the National Cancer Institute. Prior to her retirement, Loud assisted in the development and curation of a new web-based data and patient management system. She worked on a web-based data and patient management system that was critical to DCEG’s Covid-19 pandemic response, bringing the COVID code study of genetic and immunologic contributions to the severity of disease from conception to production in less than 6 months.

== Selected works ==
- Loud, Jennifer T. (2010-09-01). "Direct-to-Consumer Genetic and Genomic Testing: Preparing Nurse Practitioners for Genomic Healthcare". The Journal for Nurse Practitioners. 6 (8): 585–594. doi:10.1016/j.nurpra.2010.06.007. ISSN 1555-4155. PMC 2995214. PMID 21132113.
- Loud, Jennifer T.; Murphy, Jeanne (2017-05-01). "Cancer Screening and Early Detection in the 21st Century". Seminars in Oncology Nursing. 33 (2): 121–128. doi:10.1016/j.soncn.2017.02.002. ISSN 0749-2081. PMC 5467686. PMID 28343835.
