= Jennifer Hines =

American opera singer

Jennifer Hines is a professional mezzo-soprano opera singer. She has a Bachelor of Music and Master of Music degree from the Juilliard School. She was a member of the Seattle Opera’s young Artist Program and a Tanglewood Music Center participant. She has sung with the Palm Beach Opera, the Philadelphia Orchestra and the Sarasota Orchestra, among others. She has performed with the New York City Opera in such roles as Princess Nicolette in “The Love for Three Oranges” and Mercedes in “Carmen.” She is the daughter of Helene Hines a well-known handcyclist.
