= Jenifer Fox =

American educator, author, and speaker

Jenifer Fox (born December 9, 1960) is an American educator, author, painter and speaker.

She is best known for promoting strengths-based approaches in K-12 schools. In 2008, her book '' Your Child's Strengths: Discover Them, Develop Them, Use Them'' was published by Viking Press. In 2007, Jenifer traveled around the country with strengths pioneer Marcus Buckingham promoting the Strengths Movement; Buckingham wrote the foreword to Fox's book, citing her vision for education as something revolutionary. The book won two gold Nautilus Book Nautilus Book Award awards for Best Family and Parenting Book, 2010 and Social Justice for Education. In 2010, Your Child's Strengths was selected for a "Mon's Choice Award Mom's Choice Award Your Child's Strengths'' is also published in Polish, Japanese, Chinese, Indonesian, and South Korean. Jenifer Fox is considered a leader of the Strengths Movement in Schools. Fox created a high school strengths development curriculum called The Affinities Program.which is used in schools throughout the country and around the world. Fox also authored The Differentiated Instruction Book of Lists published in 2011 by Jossey-Bass.

In 2014, Fox was hired to develop a new school in the Mississippi Delta. She founded The Delta School The Delta School based on her strengths program, The Makers Movement and The School to Farm Movement. Fox served on the national committee of Makers Educators, founded by the White House under the Obama administration.

Jenifer Fox has provided keynote speeches on 21st-century education, business, and school innovation and developing children's strengths to over 500 organizations. She has made numerous television appearances and radio broadcasts, speaking on schools, students, and leadership.

In 2023, Fox was selected as a winner in the Quillkeepers Press semi-annual poetry competition for her collection "My West" published in 2023. Her poems appear in journals and anthologies. She is also known for her watercolor portraits which have appeared in literary magazines and gallery shows in the United States.

Fox holds an undergraduate degree from the University of Wisconsin–Madison and two master's degrees: an MA from Middlebury College’s Bread Loaf School of English and an M.Ed. from Harvard University. Jenifer Fox is also known for turning-around struggling schools. She has led five schools through times of significant challenge and into sustainability.

Born in Milwaukee, Wisconsin, Jenifer is the grand niece of renowned circus historian Chappie Fox who is the founder of The Great Circus Parade
