= Jennifer Sakai =

American artist and photographer

Jennifer Sakai is an artist, fine art photographer, MFA professor at American University, and independent curator based in Washington, D.C.

== Photography ==
In 2025, her project "When We Return Home" detailed her Japanese family's incarceration in Poston War Relocation Center during World War II and their post war life, along with her own photography. Her project was featured in Le Monde’s M Magazine, which included an interview by Claire Guillot. Her work has also appeared in W and Vogue. Jennifer is featured in the inaugural issue of The Photographer to debut November 2025 at Paris Photo in Paris France. She is the curator and designer of The Road, a book of photographs by punk musician Brian Baker (musician). published by Akashic Books..

In 2026 Sakai was shortlisted for the LUMA Rencontres Dummy Book Award presented during the Rencontres d'Arles, as one of ten artists selected globally for the award. Her photo book dummy When We Return Home, was included in the exhibition of shortlisted books presented at the festival in Arles France June - October 2026.

In 2026 Her project When We Return Home was shortlisted for the Athens Photo Festival Dummy Award and will be exhibited at the Benaki Museum in Athens, Greece, June-July 2026.

Sakai’s work has been exhibited at: Addison/Ripley Fine Art (2025), Artsy (2023), Glen Echo Park (Maryland) (2022), Corcoran Gallery of Art (2017), and Photo London at Somerset House in May 2023.

In 2024, Sakai received the Prix Virginia, the Biennial International Prize for Photography for women, for When We Return Home. She also received an Aperture Foundation Creator Lab Prize for her photography practice. She is a member of Women Photograph, an international US-based non-profit supporting women and nonbinary visual journalists. In 2025 she was.a selected artist for Women Artists of the DMV, a multi-venue exhibition featuring the work of over 400 women artists from the District, Maryland and Virginia area curated by Florencio Campello.

She was a selected artist for the Charcoal Chico review in 2020 and 2021 and in 2023 was a prize winner in the LensCulture New Discoveries in Art Photography..

In 2027 she will be included in Common Things; Art and Objects in Public Life at the Katzen Museum in partnership with the Hannah Arendt Center at Bard College, curated by Sarah Rodgers Morris, PhD.

Sakai has received grants from the DC Commission on the Arts and Humanities for her photographic practice. She received her MFA from VCUarts, Virginia Commonwealth University and studied chromogenic printing with George Nan.

== Museum curation ==
As an independent museum curator, she curated The Gifts of Tony Podesta (2019), Border Wall (2020), and Vertiginous Matter (2022) at American University Katzen Arts Center. The latter named one of the year's top eight local photography exhibits by Washington City Paper.

== Publications as a writer or curator ==
- The Road: Brian Baker (musician) Photographs. Akashic Books, November 2025.
- Vertiginous Matter. American University Press, 2022.
- Border Wall: The Wall from Another Perspective – Allan Gerson Photographs. American University Press, September 2020.
- The Gifts of Tony Podesta. Curated by Klaus Ottmann and Jennifer Sakai; curator essay by Jennifer Sakai. American University Press, January 2019.

== Academic appointments ==
- 2020–present – Visiting Faculty, American University Master of Fine Arts program; teaching across all fine-art disciplines.
- 2013–2019 – Assistant Professor, George Washington University, Fine Art Program; Thesis Professor.
- 2008–2013 – Visiting Professor, The Corcoran School of Art; chromogenic printing and Fine Art Foundation Program.
