= Jennifer Beard =

American physician

Jennifer Beard is an American physician who is Clinical Associate Professor in the Department of Global Health at Boston University School of Public Health (BUSPH), associate editor of Public Health Post, leads the BUSPH Public Health Writing Program and also directs the MPH certificates in Global Health and Program Management.

== Education ==
Beard has a BA from Youngstown State University (1988) and an MA from Ohio University (1991), both in English literature. She has a PhD from the University of New Hampshire (1998) and an MPH in International Health from Boston University (2006).

== Career ==
Beard was the founder of the BU Program for Global Health Storytelling which brings together the BUSPH, the BU College of Communication, and the Pulitzer Center. Her “scholarship explores the intersection between population health, the arts and humanities, and journalism; and the health and well-being of key populations at high risk for HIV and trauma including sex workers, drug users, orphans, and other highly vulnerable children.”

Beard, from 2010-2014, was the principal investigator for the Ghana Operations Research for Key Populations project in collaboration with the Kwame Nkrumah University of Science and Technology, the Ghana AIDS Commission, and USAID.

== Publications ==
- Lessons Learned From a Peer Writing Coach Program in a School of Public Health
- Acute respiratory infection Boston university's collaborative research work in the last decade
- Children of female sex workers and injection drug users: a review of vulnerability, resilience, and family-centered models of care in low and middle-income countries
- But What Exactly is Public Health?
- Strengthening capacity for AIDS vaccine research: analysis of the Pfizer Global Health Fellows program and the International AIDS Vaccine Initiative.
