= Jenifer Johnston =

Scottish journalist

Jenifer Johnston born Gourock, Scotland.

Former Sunday Herald journalist 2000–2007, shortlisted for the Young Journalist of the Year category three times at the Scottish Press Awards.

An investigation on child prostitution prompted a working group at the Scottish Parliament. Police face quiz over child prostitute, Sunday Herald June 9, 2002, a co-investigation with Sunday Herald's Neil MacKay reported that British deaths in Iraq were mainly accidents and suicide, not conflict. While Sunday Herald Deputy Foreign editor, an interview with Ron Reagan included his criticism of President George W. Bush.

Johnston was press officer for the Glasgow 2014 Commonwealth Games Bid Team.

Degree BA in history from the University of Strathclyde (2000),

Politics MSc (Merit), China In the International Arena, from the University of Glasgow (2007).
