= Jennifer Conrad =

American economist

Jennifer Conrad is an American economist currently the Dalton McMichael Distinguished Professor of Finance at Kenan-Flagler Business School. Her current interests are investments and credit default swaps-equity market relationships and high-frequency trading analysis, and previously investment patterns.
