= Jay Newton-Small =

American journalist

Jennifer 'Jay' Newton-Small
- Born: November 16, 1975 (age 50)
- Education: -Deerfield Academy -Tufts University, -Columbia University School of Journalism
- Occupation: Journalist
- Writing career
- Years active: 2001–present
- Period: 2001–present
- Subjects: Washington politics, foreign policy, national trends
- Notable work: Broad Influence: How Women Are Changing the Way America Works
- Notable awards: 2016 – Everett McKinley Dirksen Award for Distinguished Reporting of Congress; 2016 – Deadline Club award for community service reporting; 2015 – Harvard Institute of Politics fellow

Jennifer 'Jay' S. Newton-Small is an American author and journalist. She has worked for TIME Magazine and Bloomberg News. Since 2024, she has been the executive editor of the Albuquerque Journal. She is also one of the founders of MemoryWell. In 2016, she wrote Broad Influence: How Women Are Changing the Way America Works.

== Early life and education ==
Jay Newton-Small was an only child born to Sue S. (Tang) Newton-Small, an international lawyer who had been born in Hong Kong as Sok Chun ("Spring Flower") Tang on December 13, 1948, and who fluently spoke Cantonese, and Graham 'Gray' Newton-Small, an Australian economist. Both of her parents were United Nations diplomats who traveled and reared Jay overseas, outside the United States. They had met in Zambia while both traveled the world for the United Nations and continue to do so thereafter. They were married for forty years and retired to Naples, Florida. Her mother, Sue S. (Tang) Newton-Small, was a passionate Republican fundraiser and socialite who loved George W. Bush and disliked Barack Obama.

Newton Small earned her high school diploma from Deerfield Academy, a B.S. in International Relations and a B.S. in Art History from Tufts University, and a Masters of Science in Journalism in 2001 from the Columbia University Graduate School of Journalism.

== Career ==
Newton-Jones worked for Agence France-Presse from 2002 to 2003 and for Bloomberg News from 2003 to 2007, where she covered the White House and US politics. In 2007, she became the Washington Correspondent, Congressional Correspondent for Time. In 2016, she published Broad Influence: How Women Are Changing the Way America Works. She left Time in 2017.

In 2024, she became the executive editor of the Albuquerque Journal. She resigned from the Journal June 1, 2026.

=== MemoryWell ===
After her father's death from Alzheimer's disease, Newton-Small worked with fellow journalists Denver Nicks and Steve Gettinger to create MemoryWell– a company where journalists would interview people with Alzheimer's and write about their lives. The organization was founded after Newton-Jone's departure from Time.

== Personal life ==
Newton-Small is married. She can speak English, French, and Spanish.

== Awards ==
- 2016 – Everett McKinley Dirksen Award for Distinguished Reporting of Congress, for article in Elle.
- 2016 – Deadline Club award for community service reporting, awarded to Don Von Drehle, Jay Newton-Small, and Maya Rhodan, "What It Takes to Forgive a Killer" in TIME Magazine
