= Jennifer A. Hoeting =

American statistician

Jennifer Ann Hoeting is an American statistician known for her work with Adrian Raftery, David Madigan, and others on Bayesian model averaging. She is a professor of statistics at Colorado State University, and executive editor of the open-access journal Advances in Statistical Climatology, Meteorology and Oceanography, published by Copernicus Publications. With Geof H. Givens, a colleague at Colorado State, she is the author of Computational Statistics (Wiley, 2005; 2nd ed., 2013), a graduate textbook on computational methods in statistics.

== Education and career ==
Hoeting graduated from the University of Michigan in 1988, majoring in statistics and psychology, and completed her Ph.D. in statistics in 1994 from the University of Washington. Her dissertation, jointly supervised by David Madigan and Adrian Raftery, was Accounting for Model Uncertainty in Linear Regression. She joined the Colorado State faculty in 1994. In 2011, she chaired the Section of Statistics and the Environment of the American Statistical Association.

== Awards and honors ==
In 2013, Hoeting was elected as a Fellow of the American Statistical Association. In 2015 she was selected to give the Professor Laureate Lecture of the College of Natural Sciences at Colorado State, and won the Distinguished Achievement Medal of the Section of Statistics and the Environment of the American Statistical Association.
