= Jennifer D. Luff =

Jennifer D. Luff is a historian of twentieth-century politics and state development in the United States and the United Kingdom and an associate teaching professor of history at Johns Hopkins Krieger School of Arts and Sciences in the Department of Political Science. Previously she was an associate professor of history at Durham University. She was awarded a fellowship from Princeton University's Shelby Cullom Davis Center for Historical Studies for academic year 2024-2025.

== Early life and career ==
Luff received her BA in English literature from Ohio State University in 1992 and her Ph.D. in American studies from the College of William and Mary in 2005. Between 1998 and 2006 she worked as a strategist and campaigner on union organizing drives for the United Steelworkers of America, AFL–CIO, Service Employees International Union, and the Change to Win Federation. While at the AFL–CIO, she co-authored an article on the history of organizing with Sam Luebke, the director of the Organizing Institute. From 2009 to 2013 Luff served as the founding research director of Georgetown University’s Kalmanovitz Initiative for Labor and the Working Poor. At Georgetown she co-organized a 2012 conference on public policy for low-wage workers with CUNY’s Murphy Institute, which was published as What Works for Workers? Public Policy and Innovative Strategy for Low-Wage Workers. She also led a digital history project that documented the history of the Justice for Janitors campaign in the 1980s and 1990s in Washington, DC.

== Academic career ==
Luff has taught history as a visiting professor at the University of California, Los Angeles; the University of California, Irvine; and Georgetown University. In 2006-2007 she was the inaugural postdoctoral fellow at New York University’s Center for the United States and the Cold War, and in 2007-2008 she was a postdoctoral fellow at UCLA's Institute for Research on Labor and Employment. She began teaching at Durham University in the Durham University Department of History in 2013.

Her first book, Commonsense Anticommunism: Labor and Civil Liberties between the World Wars, was called "an unusually good book about a subject usually dealt with poorly" by the historian John Earl Haynes. Flagging the book as "recommended," Choice called it "a very interesting and persuasive book." Luff's coedited volume What Works for Workers? Public Policies and Innovative Strategies for Low-Wage Workers was described as "an excellent primer, sadly bearing mostly discouraging news about the efficacy of current strategies to significantly improve the economic prospects of low-wage workers in America." Her current research examines Britain's secret programme to bar suspected Communists from government service between 1921 and 1950.

Luff is an elected Fellow of the Royal Historical Society.

== Selected publications ==
- Luff, Jennifer (2012). Commonsense Anticommunism: Labor and Civil Liberties Between the World Wars. Chapel Hill: University of North Carolina Press. ISBN 978-1469622125.
- Luff, Jennifer. "Interwar Labor Anticommunism in the United States and United Kingdom," Journal of Contemporary History, vol. 33, no. 1 (January 2018), 109-133.
- Luff, Jennifer. "Covert and Overt Operations: Interwar Political Policing in the United States and the United Kingdom," American Historical Review, vol. 122, no. 3 (June 2017), 727–757.
- Luff, Jennifer. "Rethinking Interwar Conservatism, Communism, and Repression," and "Response," for a forum on Commonsense Anticommunism, in Journal of the Historical Society, vol. 13, no. 2 (June 2013), 101–114 and 157–162.
- Luff, Jennifer. "Featherbedding, Fabricating, and the Failure of Authority in The Wire." Labor: Studies in Working Class History of the Americas, vol. 10, no. 1 (Spring 2013), 21–27.
- Luff, Jennifer. "New Men of Power: Ronald Reagan, Jack Tenney, and Postwar Labor Anticommunism," in De-Centering Cold War History: Local and Global Change, edited by Jadwiga E. Pieper-Mooney and Fabio Lanza (London and New York: Routledge, 2013), 99-122.
- Luff, Jennifer. "Surrogate Supervisors: Railway Spotters and the Origins of Workplace Surveillance," in Labor: Studies in Working Class History of the Americas, vol. 5, no. 1, (February 2008), 47–74.
- Luff, Jennifer. "Organizing: A Secret History," co-authored with Sam Luebke, Labor History, vol. 44, no. 4 (December 2003), 421–432.
