= Jennifer Malat =

American sociologist

- Born: Minneapolis, Minnesota, US

Academic background
- Education: BS, University of Minnesota; MA, PhD, University of Michigan

Academic work
- Discipline: Sociologist
- Institutions: University of New Mexico; Virginia Commonwealth University; University of Cincinnati

Jennifer Malat is an American sociologist. She is dean of the College of Arts & Sciences at the University of New Mexico.

== Early life and education ==
Malat was raised in Rochester, Minnesota and attended the University of Minnesota for her Bachelor of Science degree in sociology. She then traveled to Michigan to earn her Master's degree and PhD in sociology from the University of Michigan.

== Career ==
Upon receiving her PhD, Malat joined the faculty of the Department of Sociology at the University of Cincinnati as an assistant professor in 2000. She was promoted to associate professor in 2006 and full professor in 2014. Malat's research examines how racial inequity affects health.

In 2011, she was appointed director of the University of Cincinnati's Kunz Center for Social Research. Later, Malat co-founded The Cincinnati Project with Earl Wright II in 2013 and served as its founding director until 2020. The project was a research initiative aimed at promoting equity throughout the city. In 2016, Malat served as the first associate dean—later, the title was changed to divisional dean—for the social sciences in the College of Arts and Sciences at the University of Cincinnati.

In 2020, Malat left her position at the University of Cincinnati for Virginia Commonwealth University. She first served as dean of the College of Humanities and Sciences. Then in 2022, she joined the Office of Development and Alumni Relations to support senior leaders' efforts to ensure an inclusive approach to philanthropy at Virginia Commonwealth University.

In 2023, Malat was appointed dean of the College of Arts & Sciences at the University of New Mexico, and she began her term on August 21, 2023.
