= Jennifer R. Niebyl =

Canadian researcher (born 1942)

- Born: 1942 (age 83–84); Montreal, Quebec, Canada
- Education: McGill University (B.S.); Yale University School of Medicine (M.D.)
- Occupations: Researcher and physician
- Years active: 1968-2018
- Employer(s): Johns Hopkins Hospital, University of Iowa Hospitals and Clinics

Jennifer R. Niebyl (born 1942) is a Canadian obstetrics and gynaecology researcher and professor. She is known for her contributions to the understanding of drug use during pregnancy and lactation.

== Early life and education ==
Niebyl was born in 1942 in Montreal, Quebec. She was born prematurely due to a high-risk pregnancy; her mother had previously suffered five miscarriages.

Niebyl earned a Bachelor of Science in nursing from McGill University. She then attended the Yale University School of Medicine, where she received her MD in 1967 and specialized in obstetrics and gynaecology.

After difficulties securing a residency because of her gender, Niebyl eventually completed a residency at Cornell University–New York Hospital from 1968 to 1970, followed by a residency at Johns Hopkins Hospital from 1970 to 1973.

== Career ==
In 1982, Niebyl was promoted to director of the maternal-fetal medicine division at Johns Hopkins. She specializes in high-risk obstetrics, with research interests including medical drug use in pregnancy, tocolytic agents for preterm labor, nutrition in pregnancy, nausea and vomiting during pregnancy, and the use of folic acid to prevent birth defects. Niebyl has said that she studied medicine in order to "be in charge of the decision-making process for the health care of women."

Niebyl is a professor at the Roy J. and Lucille A. Carver College of Medicine, University of Iowa, where she also serves as chair of the Department of Obstetrics and Gynecology. She is one of the first women in the United States to head a department in the field. She is certified by the American Board of Obstetrics & Gynecology.

== Memberships and affiliations ==
Niebyl is a member of various societies, including:

- The Society for Gynecologic Investigation (president from 2001 to 2001)
- The Society for Maternal-Fetal Medince (board member)
- The American Gynecological and Obstetrical Society
- The Institute of Medicine, National Academy of Sciences (elected in 1997)
- Johns Hopkins Society of Scholars (elected in 1997)
- The American Board of Obstetrics and Gynecology (examiner since 1984)

Niebyl has served on various committees, including:

- Food and Drug Administration Fertility and Maternal Health Drugs Advisory Committee (1988–1993)
- U.S. Pharmacopeia Obstetrics and Gynecology Expert Committee
- The American College of Obstetricians and Gynecologists
- Committee on Obstetrics: Maternal-Fetal Medicine
- The Education Commission
- Health Care Commission

== Select bibliography ==
=== Books ===
- Drug Use in Pregnancy (1988, as editor)
- Obstetrics: Normal and Problem Pregnancies (1988, co-editor)

=== Contributions ===
- Teratology and Drugs in Pregnancy (2008, Global Library of Women's Medicine, with Joe Leigh Simpson)
- Conception and Prenatal Development (2009, The Merck Manual Professional Edition)
- Strategies to Treat Nausea and Vomiting During Pregnancy (2011, Physician's Weekly)
- Drugs and Environmental Agents in Pregnancy and Lactation: Embryology, Teratology, Epidemiology (2012, Obstetrics: Normal and Problem Pregnancies 6th edition)

=== Journals ===
- The American Journal of Perinatology (co-editor-in-chief)
- Journal of the Society for Gynecologic Investigation (associate editor)

=== Other ===
- Perspectives on Hyperemesis Gravidarum (podcast)
