= Jennifer Trusted =

British philosopher of science (1925–2017

Jennifer Lesley Trusted (28 March 1925 – 13 April 2017) was a British philosopher of physics, metaphysics, ethics, and the history of science.

Trusted was born in Cambridge on 28 March 1925. She died on 13 April 2017, at the age of 93.

== Published works ==
- Trusted, Jennifer (1991). Physics and metaphysics : theories of space and time. London: Routledge. ISBN 0-415-05948-8. OCLC 22422769.
- Trusted, Jennifer (1987). Moral principles and social values. London: Routledge & Kegan Paul. ISBN 0-7102-1047-7. OCLC 14188004.
- Trusted, Jennifer (1984). Free will and responsibility. Oxford [Oxfordshire]: Oxford University Press. ISBN 0-19-219189-6. OCLC 9945981.
- Trusted, Jennifer (1990-01-01). "Scientific Quasi-Realism". Mind. XCIX (393): 109–111. doi:10.1093/mind/XCIX.393.109. ISSN 0026-4423.
- Trusted, Jennifer (1981). An introduction to the philosophy of knowledge. London: Macmillan. ISBN 0-333-32297-5. OCLC 8514411.

== Sources ==
- Horgan, Terence (1988). "Review of Free Will and Responsibility". Noûs. 22 (2): 332–334. doi:10.2307/2215871. ISSN 0029-4624. JSTOR 2215871.
- Brown, Stuart (2006), "Trusted, Jennifer Lesley", in Grayling, A.C; Goulder, Naomi; Pyle, Andrew (eds.), The Continuum Encyclopedia of British Philosophy, Continuum, doi:10.1093/acref/9780199754694.001.0001, hdl:11693/51028, ISBN 978-0-19-975469-4
