= Jennifer Herold =

Jennifer Herold (born March 26, 1985) was a Republican candidate for the Ohio House of Representatives for the 7th District in 2016. She was an early endorsee of President Donald Trump.

Jen Herold is a graduate of Bowling Green State University, as well as the University of Toledo where she obtained her Doctorate of Occupational Therapy. She is married and has two sons and one daughter.

She rose to national prominence as an advocate for working mothers which was sigma when her opponent questioned her ability to run for office as well as take care of her children. The story was picked up by outlets such as The Today Show, Huffington Post, and Christian Science Monitor.

She currently resides in Flagler County, Florida. Herold serves as the coalition lead for Parents and Teachers for Byron Donalds for Florida Governor.
