= Savanna's Act =

US legislation to improve access to justice for Native American women

- Other short titles: MMIW Act
- Long title: To update the online data entry format for federal databases relevant to cases of missing and murdered indigenous women.
- Acronyms (colloquial): Savanna's Act

Citations
- Public law: Pub. L. 116–165 (text) (PDF)

Legislative history
- Introduced in the Senate as 1) S. 1942 2) S. 227 by 1) Heidi Heitkamp (D–ND) 2) Lisa Murkowski (R–AK), Catherine Cortez Masto (D–NV) on 1) October 5, 2017 2) January 25, 2019; Committee consideration by Senate Committee on Indian Affairs and Permanent Subcommittee on Investigations; Passed the Senate on December 6, 2018 (Unanimous consent); Signed into law by President Donald Trump on October 10, 2020

Savanna's Act or the #MMIW Act (MMIW meaning Missing and Murdered Indigenous Women) reforms law enforcement and justice protocols appropriate to address missing and murdered Native women, and for other purposes. An initial version of the bill passed the Senate on December 6, 2018. It was held by Bob Goodlatte on December 10, 2018.

The bill, after the 2018–19 United States federal government shutdown reintroduced in 2019 as S.227, was nicknamed after Fargo, North Dakota resident Savanna LaFontaine-Greywind, who was murdered in August 2017, as an example of the statistics regarding abuse and homicide of Native American women. A related bill on the state level is Hanna's Act in Montana, a bill named after Hanna Harris of the Northern Cheyenne Indian Tribe in Montana, who was 21 years old when she went missing on July 4, 2013.

== Support and opposition ==
Initially just a method to improve data collection on missing and murdered Indigenous women to address that crisis for law enforcement bodies on both reservations and non-reservation US territories, modifications to give tribal law enforcement access to federal databases seems to expose a lack of trust on both sides. In this specific case, the woman being pregnant and her baby having been harvested by the murderer, two people went missing: the woman and her baby. To help this act along, the S. 982 Not Invisible Act of 2019 was introduced (since replaced by S. 5087) to the House on the initiative of Deb Haaland and Norma Torres and to the Senate by Catherine Cortez Masto on April 2, 2019 to increase intergovernmental coordination to identify and combat violent crime within Indian lands and of Indians. It was finally passed by Congress alongside the Not Invisible Act in September 2020. Both acts were signed into law in 2020 by President Donald Trump.

== Legacy ==
The story of the LaFontaine-Greywind murder was made into an episode of a true crime series on HLN called "Nightmare in Fargo" in 2021.
