= Jennifer K. Stuller =

American historian

- Born: July 14, 1975 (age 51); California, U.S.
- Occupations: Writer, critic
- Writing career
- Period: 2000–present
- Notable works: Ink-Stained Amazons and Cinematic Warriors: Superwomen in Modern Mythology
- Website: ink-stainedamazon.com

Jennifer K. Stuller (born July 14, 1975 in Marin County, California) is an American writer, editor, popular culture critic and historian best known for her work on female representation in comic books, TV and movies. She is the author of Ink-Stained Amazons and Cinematic Warriors: Superwomen in Modern Mythology and a frequent contributor to Bitch magazine as well as a co-founder and director emeritus of programming and events for GeekGirlCon.

Stuller received her bachelor's degree, magna cum laude, from the University of Washington in the program in the comparative history of ideas where she later offered a survey course on the history of comic books.
