= Jennifer E. Smith (biologist) =

Behavioral ecologist and evolutionary biologist

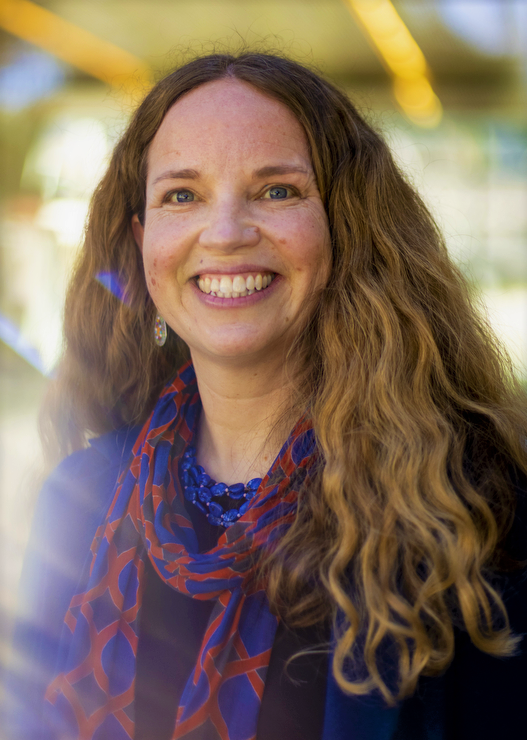

Jennifer Elaine Smith (Jenn Smith) is a behavioral ecologist and evolutionary biologist. She is a professor of biology at University of Wisconsin, Eau Claire. Previously, she was an associate professor and chair of biology at Mills College, in Oakland, California, before its merger with Northeastern University. Her research focuses primarily on the social lives of mammals based on insights gained from long-term studies on marked individuals and comparative approaches.

== Early life and education ==
Smith was born in the small coastal town of Cushing, Maine. She holds a B.A. in biology with a concentration in environmental science from Colby College and an M.S. in integrative biology from University of Illinois at Urbana–Champaign. She went on to complete dual PhDs in zoology and the Ecology, Evolution, and Behavior (EEB) Program at Michigan State University. Her dissertation research with Kay E. Holekamp involved extensive fieldwork in Kenya and focused on the evolutionary and ecological forces shaping patterns of cooperation among spotted hyenas Before joining the faculty at Mills College, she was an American Association of University Women postdoctoral fellow with Daniel T. Blumstein at the Department of Ecology and Evolutionary Biology, as well as in the Institute for Society and Genetics, at the University of California, Los Angeles.

== Awards and academic honors ==
Smith was elected as a Fellow of the Animal Behavior Society in 2026 [] and received the Penny Bernstein Distinguished Teaching Award from the Animal Behavior Society in 2017. Other awards bestowed upon Smith include several other teaching awards, including one from Phi Beta Kappa. She also received fellowships from the American Society of University Women and from the P.E.O. Sisterhood International.

== Research contributions ==
Smith is known for her contributions to our understanding of sociality in free-living mammals. Among her most prominent contributions are those focused on animal social networks, comparative social evolution, the fission-fusion society of and coalition formation in spotted hyenas, leadership in mammalian societies, explaining large-scale patterns of collective animal behavior, intergroup conflict, and intragroup coalitions across mammalian societies. Since 2013, she has managed her own Long-term Study on the Behavioral Ecology of the California ground squirrel at Briones Regional Park. This project on marked individual ground squirrels is revealing new insights into the nexus among behavioral type (i.e., personality traits), stress physiology, parasite loads, microbial diversity, carnivory, and social networks in a changing world. More broadly, Smith also applies comparative approaches to understand patterns of (in)equality, cooperation, and leadership in social mammals.
