= Jennifer Smith (soprano) =

Jennifer Smith (born 13 July 1945 in Lisbon, Portugal) graduated from the Conservatório Nacional de Lisboa and went to London on a Gulbenkian scholarship. Her varied recording career includes opera and recital from baroque to modern. Her ability to sing in European-Portuguese and Brazilian Portuguese makes her a specialist in the music of those countries and composers such as Jorge Croner de Vasconcelos, Artur Santos, Heitor Villa-Lobos and Hekel Tavares. She appeared in Tony Palmer's 1995 television film on Henry Purcell, "England My England". She was professor of vocal studies and French Mélodie at the Royal College of Music, London, from 1997 to 2007. She now lives in Vendée, France. She has two children, singer-songwriter Carmen Smith and author Joseph Smith.

== Sources ==
- Cummings, David (ed.), "Smith, Jennifer", International Who's Who in Music, Routledge, 2000, p. 602. ISBN 0-948875-53-4
- Hyperion Records, Jennifer Smith (soprano):biography and discography accessed 28 January 2008
- Warrack, John; West, Ewan (1996). "Smith, Jennifer". The Concise Oxford Dictionary of Opera. Oxford University Press.
