= Jennifer Rothman =

American legal scholar (born 1969)

Jennifer E. Rothman is an American legal scholar who specializes in intellectual property, privacy, entertainment & media law, and is recognized as the leading expert on right of publicity and personality rights. In 2021, Rothman was appointed as the Nicholas F. Gallicchio Professor of Law at the University of Pennsylvania Law School.

Her book, The Right of Publicity: Privacy Reimagined for a Public World, published by Harvard University Press, has been described as the “definitive biography of the right of publicity.” Rothman is also the author of numerous essays and articles including “Postmortem Privacy”, published in the Michigan Law Review, “Navigating the Identity Thicket: Trademark’s Lost Theory of Personality, the Right of Publicity, and Preemption”, published in the Harvard Law Review, "The First Amendment and the Right(s) of Publicity, published in the Yale Law Journal, and "The Inalienable Right of Publicity, published in the Georgetown Law Journal.

Rothman has testified in Congress multiples times, most recently to address issues involving intellectual property, personality rights, and artificial intelligence. Rothman is also the creator of Rothman’s Roadmap to the Right of Publicity, an online resource, located at www.rightofpublicityroadmap.com, that provides analysis of right of publicity and related laws, as well as commentary on recent cases and legislation.

Rothman is the Reporter for the Uniform Law Commission Study of the Protection of Name, Image, and Likeness Rights, an elected member of the American Law Institute, and an adviser on the Restatement of the Law (Third) of Torts: Defamation and Privacy.

Rothman was raised in Berkeley, California. After graduating from Princeton University, she attended the University of Southern California School of Cinematic Arts and worked for Paramount Pictures and Castle Rock Entertainment. After earning a J.D. degree from the UCLA School of Law, Rothman served as a law clerk for Marsha S. Berzon. She has served on the faculty at Washington University in St. Louis and at Loyola Law School as the William G. Coskran Professor of Law.
