= Jenny Poskitt =

New Zealand academic

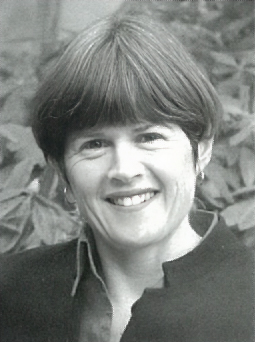
- Poskitt in 2002
- Other name: Jennifer Mary Poskitt

Academic background
- Education: Massey University
- Theses: An ethnographic study of two schools: some aspects of school culture and the significance for change (1989); Research as learning: the realities of action research in a New Zealand individualised learning programme (1994)
- Doctoral advisor: Don McAlpine, John Codd
- Other advisor: Wayne Leonard Edwards

Academic work
- Discipline: Educational assessment
- Institutions: Massey University

Jennifer Mary Poskitt is a New Zealand academic who is a full professor at Massey University with experience in educational assessment.

== Career ==
Poskitt is a trained teacher, and worked as a primary school teacher. Poskitt completed a master's degree on school culture and a PhD on action research and individualised learning programmes, both at Massey University. Poskitt then joined the faculty of Massey University, rising to full professor in 2024.

Poskitt is co-founder of the New Zealand Assessment Institute, with Michael Absolum. The institute is an "advocacy body focused on improving system capability in educational assessment". In 2022, Poskitt was appointed as the Chair of the New Zealand Qualifications Authority Technical Overview Group Assessment. The Chair of the NZQA Board, Tracey Martin, acknowledged Poskitt's more than thirty year career in educational assessment. Poskitt has advised on educational assessment in a number of groups and institutions, including through the Royal New Zealand College of General Practitioners’ Academic Tahuhu Committee, the University of Glasgow, and the South Australian Certificate in Education Board.

== Honours and awards ==
In 2022, Poskitt was awarded the Massey University Research Supervisor Medal. The award recognised Poskitt's "sustained and significant contributions to educational assessment research with impacts on policy and practice, both nationally and internationally", and also noted that she had supervised more than 70 postgraduate students.

== Selected works ==
- Poskitt, Jennifer Mary (2014). "Transforming professional learning and practice in assessment for learning". Curriculum Journal. 25 (4): 542–566. doi:10.1080/09585176.2014.981557. Wikidata Q126920590.
- Poskitt, Jennifer Mary (2001). "Schools doing it for themselves: Successful professional development". set Research Information for Teachers (1): 4–7. doi:10.18296/set.0765. Wikidata Q126920589.
- Poskitt, Jennifer Mary (1989). An ethnographic study of two schools : some aspects of school culture and the significance for change (Master of Educational Administration thesis). Massey University. hdl:10179/5625. Wikidata Q112848194.
