= Jennifer Whyte =

British engineer

- Citizenship: United Kingdom
- Education: University of Cambridge (BA/MA); Loughborough University (PhD)
- Known for: Systems integration, Digital engineering, Project analytics
- Scientific career
- Fields: Civil engineering, Systems engineering
- Workplaces: University of Sydney; Imperial College London; University of Reading; University of Sussex

Jennifer Whyte is a British engineer who specialises in the digital design and delivery of major infrastructure projects. She is Director of the John Grill Institute for Project Leadership and Head of the School of Project Management at the University of Sydney. She also holds a fractional Professorship in the Department of Civil and Environmental Engineering at Imperial College London, where she previously served as Director of the Centre for Systems Engineering and Innovation. Her research explores how systems thinking, data analytics and advanced manufacturing techniques can transform the conception, set-up and delivery of complex projects.

== Early life and education ==
Whyte read architecture at King's College, Cambridge, graduating BA (Hons) in 1994. She then moved to the Department of Civil and Building Engineering at Loughborough University, where she completed her PhD in 2000 on the use of virtual reality in house-building.

== Career ==
After post-doctoral work at the Science Policy Research Unit, University of Sussex (2000–2003), and a Senior Research Fellowship at Imperial College Business School (2003–2007), Whyte joined the University of Reading in 2007. With £1.25 million of EPSRC funding she founded the Design Innovation Research Centre in 2010. In 2015 she was appointed Laing O'Rourke / Royal Academy of Engineering Professor of Systems Integration at Imperial College London, directing the Centre for Systems Engineering and Innovation until 2021. Whyte moved to Australia in July 2021 to lead the John Grill Institute, but retains a fractional appointment at Imperial. Whyte's work investigates how digital information, visualisation and data-centric methods can improve project delivery. She has studied production systems on megaprojects such as Heathrow Terminal 5, London's Crossrail and the Sydney infrastructure "megaproject ecology". Her recent projects apply project analytics to interface management, configuration control and supply-chain integration.

== Leadership and policy engagement ==
Whyte was appointed to the UK Construction Leadership Council in 2019, broadening the council's industry representation. She sits on the Industrial Strategy Challenge Fund 'Transforming Construction' Advisory Board and co-investigates the Transforming Construction Network Plus. Whyte leads a strategic theme in the Alan Turing Institute / Lloyd's Register Foundation Data-Centric Engineering programme, co-curated the World Economic Forum "Engineering and Construction" Transformation Map, and gave oral evidence to the House of Lords Science and Technology Committee inquiry on off-site manufacture for construction in 2018.

== Honours ==
Whyte is a Fellow of the Institution of Civil Engineers (FICE). She held the Royal Academy of Engineering / Laing O'Rourke Research Chair in Systems Integration (2015–2021) and received the Royal Academy's Research Chair award for contributions to infrastructure systems engineering.

== Selected works ==
- Whyte, J. & Nikolić, D. Virtual Reality and the Built Environment, 2nd ed. Routledge, 2018.
- Whyte, J.; Comi, A.; Mosca, L. "Simultaneously Here and There: Situating Online Organizing in Our Embodied Material Practices." Organization Theory 4 (2023): 1–22. doi:10.1177/26317877231217311.
- Tee, R.; Davies, A.; Whyte, J. "Modular Designs and Integrating Practices: Managing Collaboration through Coordination and Cooperation." Research Policy 48 (1) (2019): 51–61. doi:10.1016/j.respol.2018.07.017.
