= Jennifer Smith (scientist) =

American marine ecologist

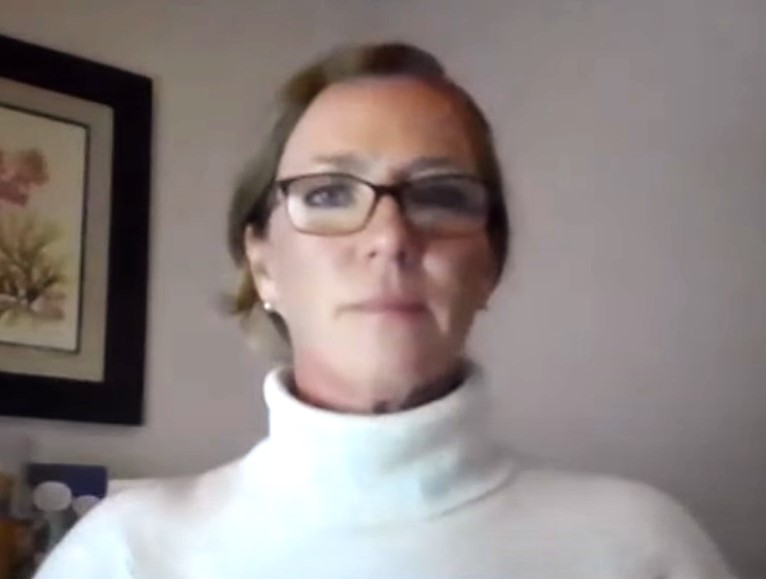
- Smith speaks to the World Economic Forum in 2020
- Born: Jennifer E. Smith; 1972 (age 53–54)
- Education: California State Polytechnic University, Humboldt; University of Hawaiʻi at Mānoa
- Scientific career
- Fields: Marine Ecology; Coral Reefs; Phycology; Seaweeds
- Workplaces: University of Hawaiʻi; Scripps Institution of Oceanography
- Thesis: Factors influencing algal blooms on tropical reefs with an emphasis on herbivory, nutrients and invasive species (2003)
- Doctoral advisor: Celia Smith
- Website: coralreefecology.ucsd.edu

Jennifer E. Smith is an American marine ecologist and coral reef expert who works at the Scripps Institution of Oceanography. Her research investigates how physical and biological processes impact the function of marine communities.

== Early life and education ==
Smith was an undergraduate student at the California State Polytechnic University, Humboldt, where she majored in zoology. She moved to the University of Hawaiʻi at Mānoa for her doctoral research, which investigated algal blooms and the impacts of nutrients and invasive species on community structure supervised by Celia Smith Tropical reefs are increasingly dominated by algal blooms, with different types of algal blooms emerging on different reefs in the Hawaiian Islands. She identified that non-indigenous marine algae require strategic management to avoid dominating over native plants.

== Research and career ==
After her PhD, Smith was appointed a postdoctoral researcher at the University of Hawaiʻi, where she worked on the causes of macroalgal blooms on Maui. Smith joined the Scripps Institution of Oceanography in 2005. She was appointed an assistant professor in 2008 and an associate professor in 2014. Her research investigates coral reef ecology and how various biological processes impact benthic communities. Specifically, she is interested in diversity within coral reef communities, and how to better understand coral reef restoration. She has visited the same coral reefs every year for over a decade, allowing her to better understand how they change over time. She also identified that adding a small amount of Asparagopsis to cattle feed can reduce the methane emissions from dairy cows.

Smith studied corals in the remote central Pacific and identified that in the absence of human disturbance, coral reefs were relatively resilient to climate-associated impacts.

=== Selected publications ===
- Global analysis of nitrogen and phosphorus limitation of primary producers in freshwater, marine and terrestrial ecosystems
- Baselines and degradation of coral reefs in the Northern Line Islands
- High-frequency dynamics of ocean pH: a multi-ecosystem comparison
