= Virginia (given name) =

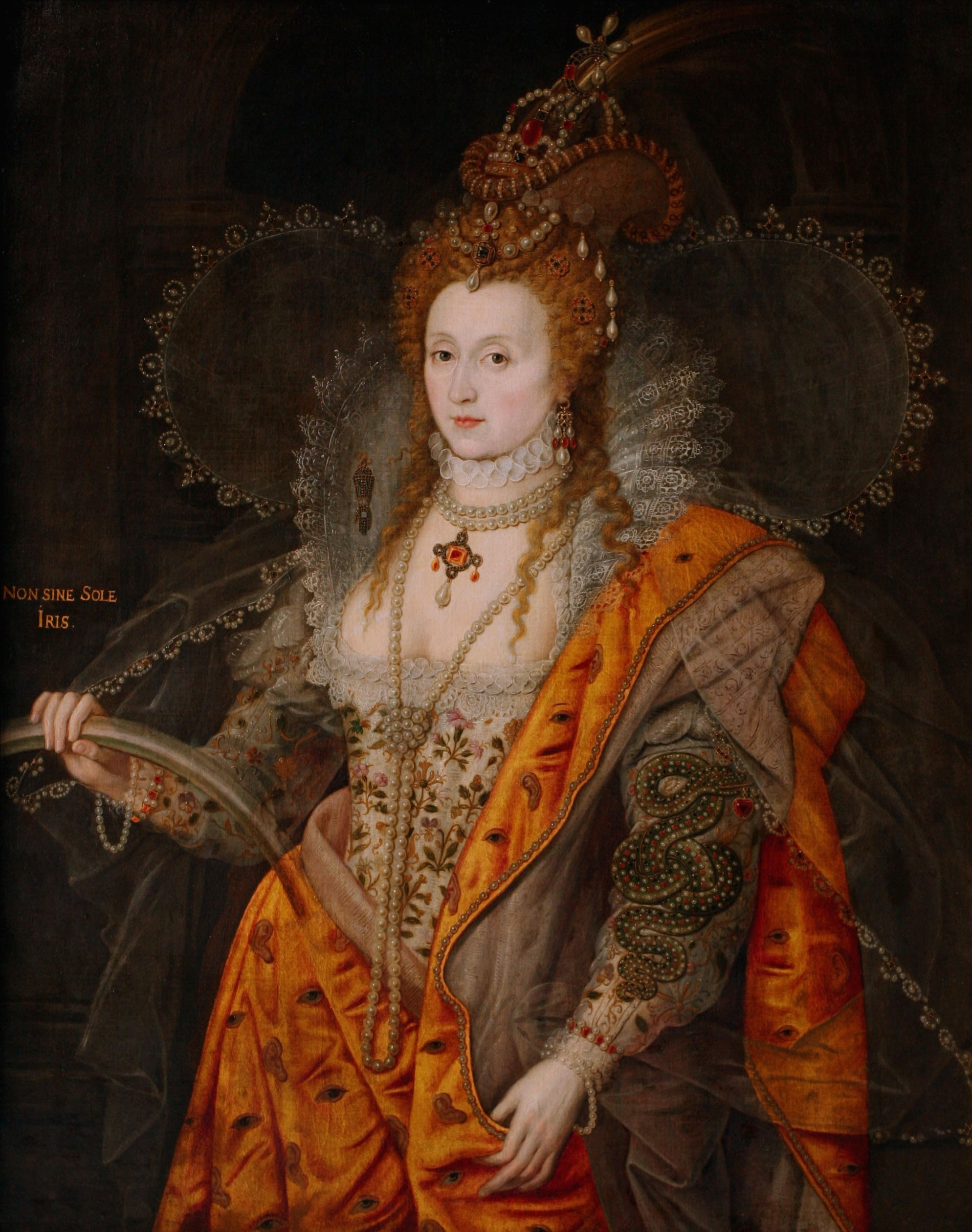
- The state of Virginia was named in honor of Elizabeth I, the "Virgin Queen." The title inspired the name Virginia for generations of girls and women.
- Pronunciation: /vərˈdʒɪnjə/
- Gender: female
- Language: Latin
- Name day: December 8

Origin
- Origin: Latin
- Meaning: "maid," "virgin," or "pure"

Other names
- Nickname: Ginny
- Related names: Virginie, Virgínia, Wirginia, Virginija, Virxinia
- Popularity: see popular names

Virginia is a Germanic and Romance feminine given name thought to be derived from the Ancient Roman family name Verginius or Virginius. It means "maiden" or "virgin" and may also be used for this reason, without connection to family names, as in the case of its usage in the case of Queen Elizabeth I, who was also called "the Virgin Queen" due to her lack of marriage.

According to legend, Virginia was a Roman girl who was killed by her father in order to save her from seduction by the corrupt government official Appius Claudius Crassus.

The name was the 34th most common name for American women and girls, according to the census of 1990. It was the 545th most popular name given to baby girls born in the United States in 2007.

Virginia Dare was the first child born to English parents in North America. Virginia O'Hanlon wrote a letter that prompted the famous "Yes, Virginia, there is a Santa Claus" editorial in the September 21, 1897 edition of The New York Sun. The most famous Virginia is probably the English modernist author Virginia Woolf.

== Variants ==
- Virgy (English, Indonesian)
- Virgee (English)
- Virgie (English, Indonesian)
- Virginia (Indonesian, Italian/Spanish)
- Virgínia (Portuguese)
- Virginie (French)
- Virginija (Lithuanian)
- Wilikinia (Hawaiian)
- Wirginia (Polish)
- Vegenia (Hawaiian)
- Βιργινία (Virginia or Viryinia) (Greek)
- Virdžinija (Вирџинија) (Serbian language)

=== Reduced forms/nicknames ===
- Ginnie (English) (see Ginny)
- Ginna (English, Indonesian)
- Ginger (English)
- Ivy (English, Indonesian)
- Nia (English, Indonesian)
- Nini (English, Indonesian)
- Ginny (English)
- Jenna (English, Indonesian)
- Jinny (English, Indonesian)
- Ginia (Spanish)
- Gina (Indonesian, Spanish, Portuguese)
- Ginata (Spanish)
- Gigi (French)
- Ginni (Indian)
- Vera (English, Indonesian)
- Vivi (French, Indonesian)
- Vi (French)
- Virgi (Italian)
- Vina (English, Indonesian)
- Nina (English, Indonesian)
- Gia (English)

== Notable people ==
- Virginia, originally Verginia, a Roman woman said to have been killed by her father to protect her virtue during the dictatorship of the Decemviri
- Virginia Apgar, American obstetrical anesthesiologist, and inventor of the Apgar score
- Virginia Barcones (born 1976), Spanish politician
- Virginia Bates (born 1943), British fashion doyenne and as English actress and as Virginia Wetherell, British actress
- Virginia Bourbon del Monte, Italian aristocrat
- Virginia Centurione Bracelli, Roman Catholic saint
- Virginia Coffey, American civil rights activist
- Virginia Frazer Boyle, American poet and writer
- Virginia Crosbie, British politician
- Virginia Mary Crawford (1862–1948), British Catholic suffragist, feminist, journalist, and author
- Virginia Clinton, mother of former United States President Bill Clinton
- Virginia Clocksin (1935–2007), American politician
- Virginia Connolly (1914–1984), American politician
- Virginia Dare, the first child born to English parents in the Americas
- Virginia Eriksdotter (1559–1633), Swedish noble
- Virginia Eskin (born 1940), American pianist
- Virginia Feito (born 1988), Spanish novelist
- Virginia Kneeland Frantz (1896–1967), American pathologist
- Princess Virginia von Fürstenberg, Italian fashion designer and artist
- Virginia Gardner (born 1995), American actress
- Virginia Giuffre (1983–2025), American-Australian justice advocate
- Virginia Hall, American World War II spy
- Virginia Hamilton (1936–2002), American author
- Virginia Hampson (born 2002), English singer
- Virginia Hey (born 1952), Australian actress
- Virginia Byers Kraus, American rheumatologist and professor
- Virginia Kravarioti, Greek sailor
- Virginia Lesser, American statistician
- Virginia Madsen, American actress
- Virginia Mahan (1949–2023), American politician
- Virginia Maloney, American politician
- Virginia Mauret (died 1983), American musician and dancer
- Virginia McKenna, British actress and author
- Virginia McLaurin (1909–2022), American activist and supercentenarian, who enlightened the Obamas during Black History Month 2016
- Virginia Faulkner McSherry (1845–1916), American non-profit executive
- Virginia Miller (disambiguation), several people
- Virginia Monier an American stage actress and theatre manager
- Virgínia Moura (1915–1998), Portuguese anti-government activist and feminist, civil engineer
- Virginia Norwood (1927–2023), American aerospace engineer, inventor, and physicist, "The Mother of Landsat"
- Virginia Nyambura (born 1993), Kenyan steeplechase runner
- Virginia Oliver (1920–2026), American lobster fisherwoman
- Virginia Pereira Álvarez (1888–1947), first Venezuelan woman to enroll in the medicine course in the country
- Virginia Provisiero (1923–2010), American comic book editor
- Virginia Ridley, American woman who was imprisoned by her husband
- Virginia Satir, American author and psychotherapist
- Virginia Shehee, American businesswoman and politician
- Virginia Sink (1913–1986), American chemical engineer, first female automotive engineer at Chrysler
- Virginia Sebastian Storage, American clubwoman
- Virginia “Ginni” Thomas, American political activist, wife of Clarence Thomas
- Virginia Thrasher, American sports shooter and Olympic gold medalist
- Virginia Tonelli (1903–1944), Italian partisan
- Virginia Wade (born 1945), British tennis player and three-time Grand Slam winner
- Virginia Walker (1908–1946), American film actress
- Virginia Warriner, New Zealand professor of business
- Virginia Wetherell (born 1943), English actress and as Virginia Bates, British fashion doyenne
- Virginia Woolf (1882–1941), English novelist and essayist
- Virginia Euwer Wolff, American author
- Virginia Yans-McLaughlin (born 1943), American scholar
- Virginia Zakian, American scientist and professor at Princeton University
- Virginia Zeani (1925–2023), Romanian-born opera singer
- Virginia "Geena" Davis (born 1956), American actress and activist
- Virginia "Ginger" Rogers (1911–1995), American actress, born Virginia McMath

== Fictional people ==
- Virginia "Pepper" Potts, fictional character in Marvel Comics
