= Ginny =

- Gender: Female

Other names
- Related names: Virginia, Ginevra, Genevieve, Jennifer, Geneva

Ginny or Ginnie is an English feminine given name or diminutive, frequently of the name Virginia. It may also serve be the diminutive form of Jennifer, Genevieve, Ginevra, or Geneva.

"Ginny" is also a slang term for the U.S. state of Virginia, used mainly in the rural western portions of the state.

== People ==
=== Virginia ===
- Ginny Arnell (born 1942), American singer and songwriter born Virginia Mazarro
- Ginny Blackmore (born 1986), New Zealand singer and songwriter
- Ginny Brown-Waite (born 1943), American politician
- Ginny Burdick (born 1947), American politician
- Ginnie Crawford (born 1983), American sprinter
- Ginny Duenkel (born 1947), American former swimmer and 1964 Olympic champion
- Ginny Fiennes (1947–2004), British explorer and wife of adventurer Ranulph Fiennes
- Virginia Gilder (born 1958), American former rower
- Virginia Grayson (born 1967), New Zealand-born Australian artist
- Virginia Leng (born 1955), British equestrienne
- Ginny McSwain, American voice director and voice actress
- Ginny Montes (1943–1994), civil rights activist and feminist
- Ginny Owens (born 1975), contemporary Christian music singer
- Ginny Radford, New Zealand girl guide leader
- Ginny Simms (1913–1994), American singer and actress
- Ginny Stikeman, Canadian filmmaker, director, producer and editor
- Ginny Tyler (1925–2012), American voice actress
- Ginny Vida (born 1939), American editor and community leader
- Ginnie Wade (1843–1863), only direct civilian fatality of the Battle of Gettysburg
- Ginny Wood (1917–2013), American environmental activist
- Ginny Wright (1932–2021), American country music singer

=== Ginny ===
- Ginny Buckley, British television presenter
- Ginny Capicchioni, American lacrosse goaltender and coach, first woman to play in a men's professional lacrosse game
- Ginny Fields (born 1945), American politician

== Fictional characters ==
- Ginny Gordon, protagonist of a series of mystery novels for adolescent girls
- Ginny Weasley, sister of Ron Weasley, girlfriend then wife of Harry Potter in the Harry Potter books by J. K. Rowling

== Other ==
- Hurricane Ginny, in the 1963 Atlantic hurricane season
- "Ginnie", a generator used to power a secret radio by British prisoners of war in the Batu Lintang camp during the Second World War
- Ingenuity, a NASA helicopter nicknamed Ginny

== See also ==
- "Ginny, Ginny", a 1979 single by the rock band Slade
- 1983 Ginny Championships and 1984 Ginny Championships, Virginia Slims indoor tennis tournaments
- Jinny, a list of people with the given name
- Jinny (band), an Italian band
- Ginny & Georgia, television series (2021)
