= ND5 =

ND5 may refer to:

- MT-ND5, a protein
- China Railways Class ND5, a diesel-electric locomotive
- North Dakota Highway 5
- An aerobic, rod-shaped ultramicrobacteria
