= Virginijus =

Virginijus is a Lithuanian masculine given name. The feminine given form is Virginija. People bearing the name Virginijus include:

- Virginijus Baltušnikas (born 1968), Lithuanian football player
- Virginijus Pikturna (born 1961), Lithuanian politician
- Virginijus Praškevičius (born 1974), Lithuanian basketball player
- Virginijus Šeškus (born 1967), Lithuanian basketball coach
- Virginijus Šikšnys (born 1956), Lithuanian biochemist
- Virginijus Sinkevičius (born 1990), Lithuanian politician
