= Nanobacterium =

Nonliving crystallizations of minerals and organic molecules

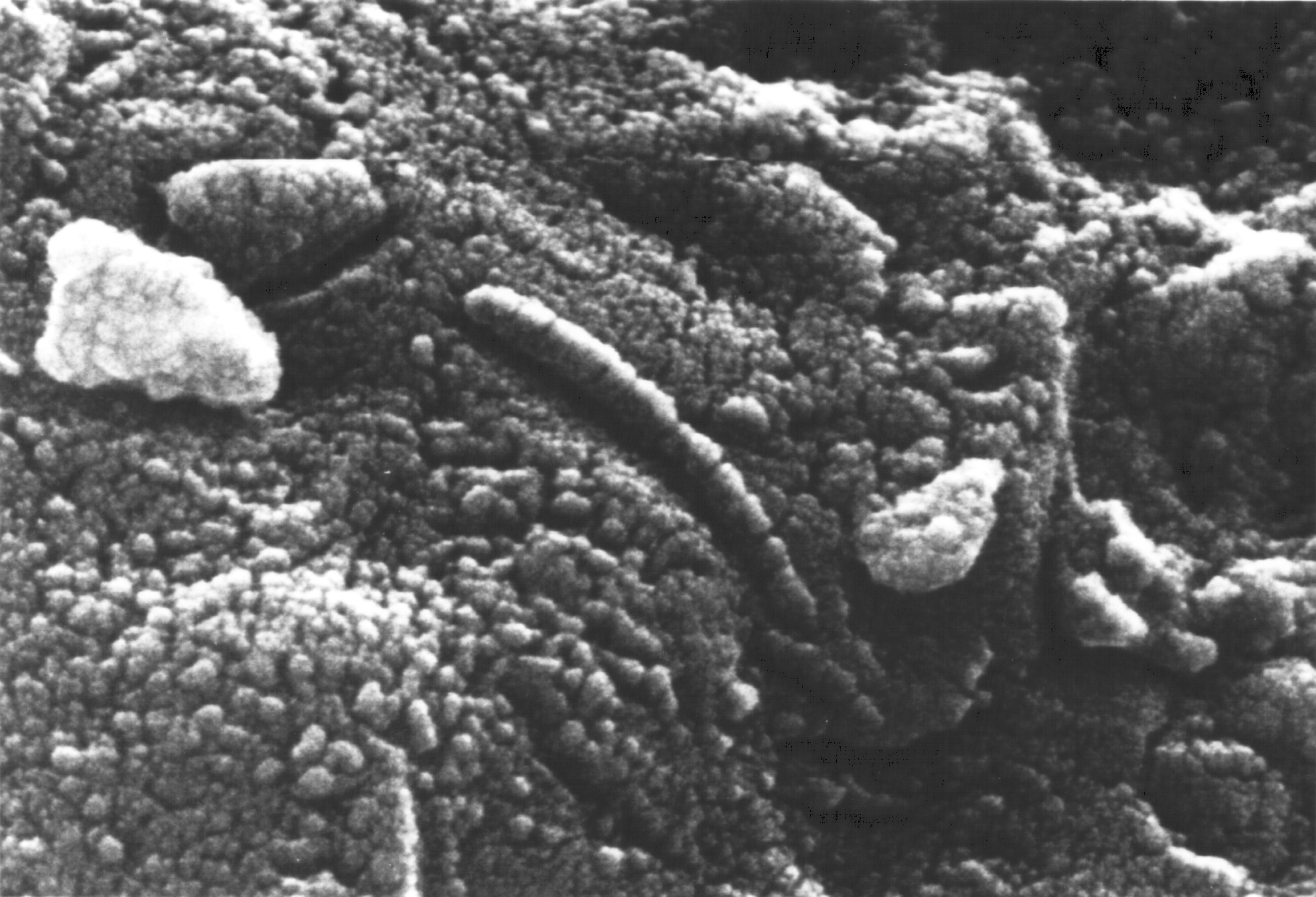
Structures found on meteorite fragment Allan Hills 84001

Nanobacterium (/ˌnænoʊbækˈtɪəriəm/ NAN-oh-bak-TEER-ee-əm, pl. nanobacteria /ˌnænoʊbækˈtɪəriə/ NAN-oh-bak-TEER-ee-ə) is the name of a discredited former proposed class of microorganisms, with a size much smaller than the generally accepted lower limit for life (about 200 nm for bacteria, like mycoplasma). The proposed class was originally based on observed nano-scale structures in geological formations (including the Martian meteorite Allan Hills 84001) capable of incorporating radiolabeled uridine, and others attributing to them a simpler, abiotic nature. One skeptic dubbed them "the cold fusion of microbiology", in reference to a notorious episode of supposed erroneous science. The term "calcifying nanoparticles" (CNPs) has also been used as a conservative name.

Research tends to agree that these structures exist, and appear to replicate in some way. However, the idea that they are living entities has now largely been discarded, and the particles are instead thought to be nonliving crystallizations of minerals and organic molecules.

== 1981–2000 ==
In 1981 Francisco Torella and Richard Y. Morita described very small cells called ultramicrobacteria. Defined as being smaller than 300 nm, by 1982 MacDonell and Hood found that some could pass through a 200 nm membrane. Early in 1989, geologist Robert L. Folk found what he later identified as nannobacteria (written with double "n"), that is, nanoparticles isolated from geological specimens in travertine from hot springs of Viterbo, Italy. Initially searching for a bacterial cause for travertine deposition, scanning electron microscope examination of the mineral where no bacteria were detectable revealed extremely small objects which appeared to be biological. His first oral presentation elicited what he called "mostly a stony silence", at the 1992 Geological Society of America's annual convention. He proposed that nanobacteria are the principal agents of precipitation of all minerals and crystals on Earth formed in liquid water, that they also cause all oxidation of metals, and that they are abundant in many biological specimens.

In 1996, NASA scientist David McKay published a study suggesting the existence of nanofossils — fossils of Martian nanobacteria — in ALH84001, a meteorite originating from Mars and found in Antarctica.

Nanobacterium sanguineum was proposed in 1998 as an explanation of certain kinds of pathologic calcification (apatite in kidney stones) by Finnish researcher Olavi Kajander and Turkish researcher Neva Çiftçioğlu, working at the University of Kuopio in Finland. According to the researchers, the particles self-replicated in microbiological culture, and the researchers further reported having identified DNA in these structures by staining.

However, a paper published in 2000 by a team led by NIH scientist John Cisar stated that the claimed "self-replication" was a form of crystalline growth. Furthermore, the claimed DNA was shown to be a contaminant- the only DNA detected in his specimens was identified as coming from the bacteria Phyllobacterium myrsinacearum, which is a common contaminant in PCR reactions.

== 2001–2009 ==
In 2004, a Mayo Clinic team led by Franklin Cockerill, John Lieske, and Virginia M. Miller reported to have isolated nanobacteria from diseased human arteries and kidney stones. Their results were published in 2004 and 2006 respectively. Similar findings were obtained in 2005 by László Puskás at the University of Szeged, Hungary. Dr. Puskás identified these particles in cultures obtained from human atherosclerotic aortic walls and blood samples of atherosclerotic patients but the group was unable to detect DNA in these samples.

In 2005, Çiftçioğlu and her research team at NASA used a rotating cell culture flask, which simulates some aspects of low-gravity conditions, to culture nanobacteria suspected of rapidly forming kidney stones in astronauts. In this environment, they were found to multiply five times faster than in normal Earth gravity. The study concluded that nanobacteria potentially have a role in forming kidney stones and may need to be screened for in crews pre-flight.

An article published to the Public Library of Science Pathogens (PLOS Pathogens) in February 2008 focused on characterization of nanobacteria. The authors claim that their results rule out the existence of nanobacteria as living entities and that they are instead unique self-propagating mineral-fetuin complexes.

An article published in the Proceedings of the National Academy of Sciences (PNAS) in April 2008 also reported that blood nanobacteria are not living organisms, and stated that "CaCO_{3} precipitates prepared in vitro are remarkably similar to purported nanobacteria in terms of their uniformly sized, membrane-delineated vesicular shapes, with cellular division-like formations and aggregations in the form of colonies." The growth of such "biomorphic" inorganic precipitates was studied in detail in a 2009 Science paper, which showed that unusual crystal growth mechanisms can produce witherite precipitates from barium chloride and silica solutions that closely resemble primitive organisms. The authors commented on the close resemblance of these crystals to putative nanobacteria, stating that their results showed that evidence for life cannot rest on morphology alone.

Other work on claimed nanobacteria in geology by R. L. Folk and colleagues includes study of calcium carbonate Bahama ooids, silicate clay minerals, metal sulfides, and iron oxides. In all of these chemically diverse minerals, the putative nanobacteria are approximately the same size, mainly 0.05–0.2 μm. This suggests a commonality of origin. At least for the type locality at Viterbo, Italy, the biogenicity of these minute cells was claimed to be supported by transmission electron microscopy (TEM). Slices through a green bioslime purportedly showed things 0.09–0.4 μm in diameter with purported cell walls and interior dots claimed to resemble ribosomes, and even smaller objects with purported cell walls and lucent interiors with diameters of 0.05 μm. Culturable organisms on earth are the same 0.05 μm size as the supposed nanobacteria on Mars.

== 2010-2024 ==
A 2024 study examined particles ranging from 80 to 900 nm found after incubating atheromatous plaques from human carotid arteries in culture medium for 4 to 8 weeks. Methods included scanning electron microscopy, X-ray spectroscopy, SDS-polyacrylamide gel electrophoresis, exposure to protease and nuclease, and quadrupole time-of-flight mass spectrometry. The study concluded that nanobacteria are not living, that they are formed by biocrystallization and that they may play a role in atherosclerosis. The authors also proposed the use of the terms "nanoforms" or "calcifying nanoparticles" to refer to nanobacteria.

== See also ==
- Protocell
- Mycoplasma — smallest known bacteria (300 nm)
- Nanoarchaeum — smallest known archaeum (400 nm)
- Parvovirus — smallest known viruses (18–28 nm)
- Prion — smallest known infectious agent (≈10 nm)
- Ultramicrobacteria — possible dormant forms of larger cells (200 nm)
