= Ginni =

Ginni is a given name, often a short version of Virginia; it may refer to the following notable people:

- Ginni Clemmens (1936-2003), American folk musician and songwriter in the genres of women's music and children's music
- Ginni Mahi (born 1998), Indian Punjabi folk, rap and hip-hop singer
- Ginni Mansberg (born 1968), general practitioner and television presenter in Australia
- Ginni Rometty (born 1957), business executive
- Ginni Thomas (born 1957), American attorney and conservative activist, wife of SCOTUS Justice Clarence Thomas
- Ginni van Katwijk (born 1985), Dutch high diver

== See also ==
- Ginnie
- Jinn
