= Ginevra (given name) =

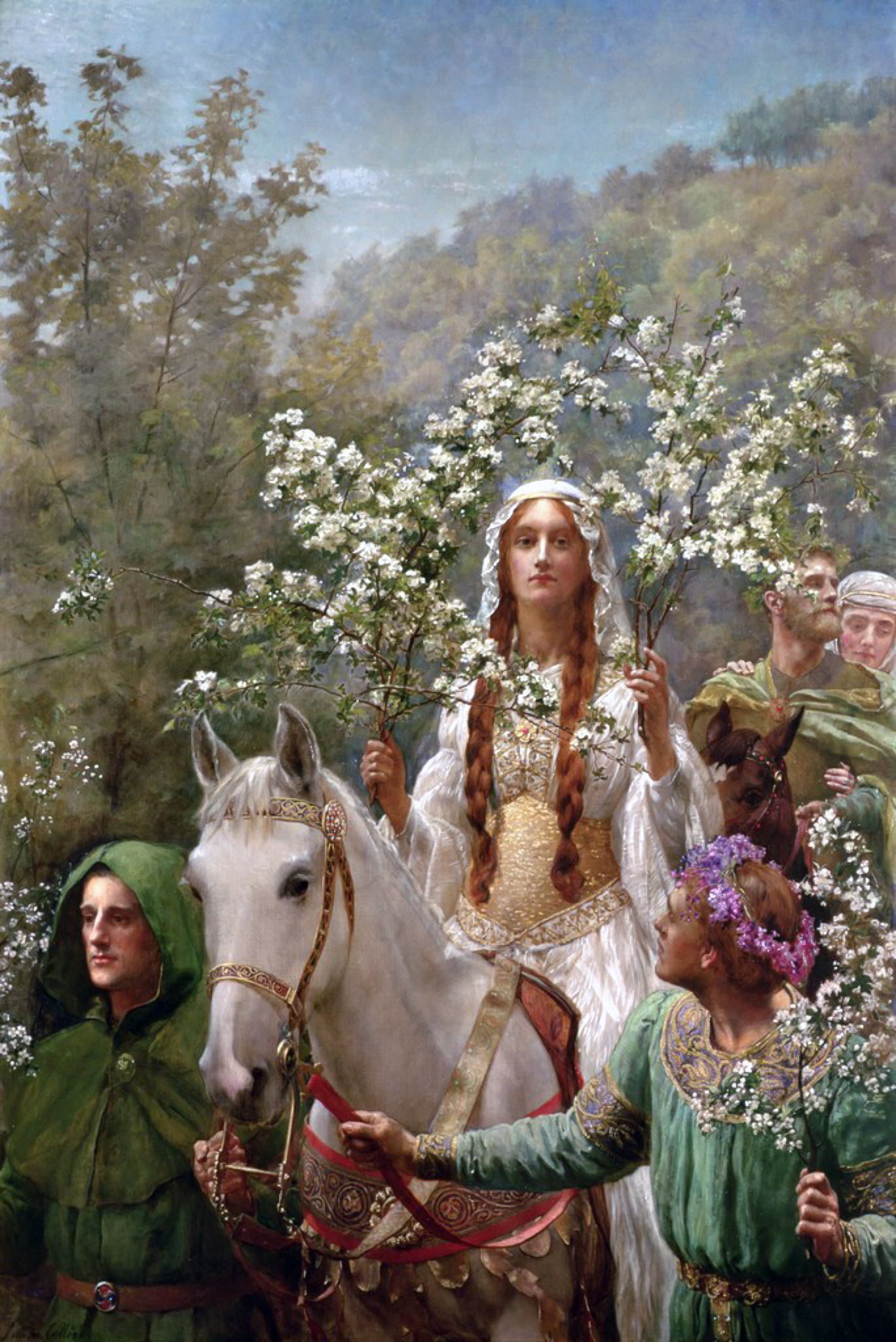
- Queen Guinevere's Maying by John Collier, 1897
- Gender: Female
- Language: Italian

Origin
- Meaning: Italian form of Guinevere, meaning white phantom.

Other names
- See also: Geneva, Guinevere, Jennifer, Juniper

Ginevra is a feminine given name. It was occasionally used in medieval and Renaissance Italy in reference to Queen Guinevere, King Arthur’s queen in the popular Arthurian legends. It is the Italian version of the name Guinevere, which is a Norman French version of the Welsh name Gwenhwyfar, meaning "white" and "smooth" or "white phantom." It is also associated with the juniper tree in Italy, where the name for the tree is ginepro. Geneva, Switzerland is called Ginevra in Italian. It is a currently popular name for girls in Italy, where it has been among the top 100 names given to newborn girls since 1999 and among the top 10 most popular names for baby girls since 2016. It is in occasional use in other countries, including the United States, where it was given to 12 newborn girls born in 2020, to 14 girls born in 2021, to 16 girls in 2022, to 15 girls in 2023, and 25 girls in 2024, and Switzerland, where it was given to 17 girls born in 2020.

== People ==
- Ginevra de' Benci (aristocrat) (1457–1521), Italian aristocrat
- Ginevra Cantofoli (c. 1608/1618–1672), Italian painter
- Ginevra Elkann (born 1979), Italian apprentice film director
- Ginevra d'Este (1419–1440), Italian noblewoman
- Ginevra Francesconi (born 2003), Italian actress and model
- Ginevra King (1898–1980), American socialite and debutante
- Ginevra Lubrano (born 1993), Italian singer-songwriter
- Ginevra Panzeri (born 2008), Italian racing driver

== Fictional characters ==
- Princess Ginevra of Scotland, one of the main characters of Handel's opera Ariodante
- Ginevra Fanshawe in Charlotte Brontë's novel Villette
- Ginevra di Scozia, the title character of the opera by Simon Mayr
- Ginevra or Ginny Weasley in Harry Potter books
