= Virginija =

- Gender: Female
- Language: Lithuanian
- Name day: 8 July

Origin
- Origin: Latin
- Region of origin: Lithuania

Other names
- Related names: Virginia, Virginijus (masculine form)

Virginija is a Lithuanian feminine given name. People bearing the name Virginija include:

- Virginija Baltraitienė (born 1958), Lithuanian politician
- Virginija Juršienė (born 1950), Lithuanian ceramic artist
- Virginija Kalinauskaitė (born 1957), Lithuanian graphic artist
- Virginija Paulauskaitė (born 1972), Lithuanian curler and curling coach
