= Virginia Miller =

Virginia Miller may refer to:

- Virginia Miller (heptathlete) (born 1979), American heptathlete
- Virginia Miller (javelin thrower) (born 1998), American javelin thrower, 2021-22 All-American for the Stanford Cardinal track and field team
- Virginia L. Miller, American microbiologist
- Virginia M. Miller, American surgeon
