= Directorate-General for Civil Protection and Emergencies =

Branch of the Spanish Department of the Interior

- Dirección General de Protección Civil y Emergencias
- Spanish Civil Defence Emblem

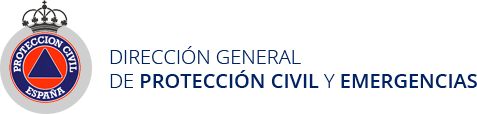

Agency overview
- Formed: May 4, 1960; 66 years ago
- Preceding agency: Passive Defence Headquarters (1941–1960)
- Type: Directorate-General
- Jurisdiction: Government of Spain
- Headquarters: 5 Quintiliano Street; Madrid
- Annual budget: € 16.8 million, 2023
- Agency executive: Benjamín Salvago González, Director-General
- Parent department: General Secretariat for Civil Protection and Emergencies
- Website: www.proteccioncivil.es

The Directorate-General for Civil Protection and Emergencies (DGPCE) is a component of the Spanish Department of the Interior responsible for promoting, planning and coordinating the various actors involved in the field of civil defence, both national and international.

Civil defence currently finds its legal basis, within the Spanish Constitution, in the obligation of public authorities to guarantee the right to life and physical integrity, as the first and most important of all fundamental rights (article 15), in the principles of national unity and territorial solidarity (article 2), and in the essential requirements of efficiency and administrative coordination (article 103). By Law, in accordance with article 30.4 of the Constitution, citizens may be imposed duties to deal with cases of serious risk.

The Directorate-General is integrated in the General Secretariat for Civil Protection and Emergencies and it is structured through three deputy directorates-general. It is headed by a director-general appointed by the Monarch at the request of the Interior Minister. Since April 2026, the director-general is Benjamín Salvago González.

== History ==
The first measures around civil protection in Spain were taken in 1941 when the Passive Defence and Territory Headquarters was created to protect the population and the resources and wealth of the country. This Headquarters depended directly on the Office of the Prime Minister and it was headed by a general officer of the Army.

However, the true origin of this body is found almost two decades later, in May 1960. This year the Headquarters was reformed and the Directorate-General for Civil Protection was created with the main objective of creating an organ with the same denomination that was used in the international scope - that of civil defense. Its functions, prime-ministerial dependence and military character remained intact. With this reform, offices began to be created in each province, chaired by civil governors. On these depended in turn the local offices chaired by the town and city mayors.

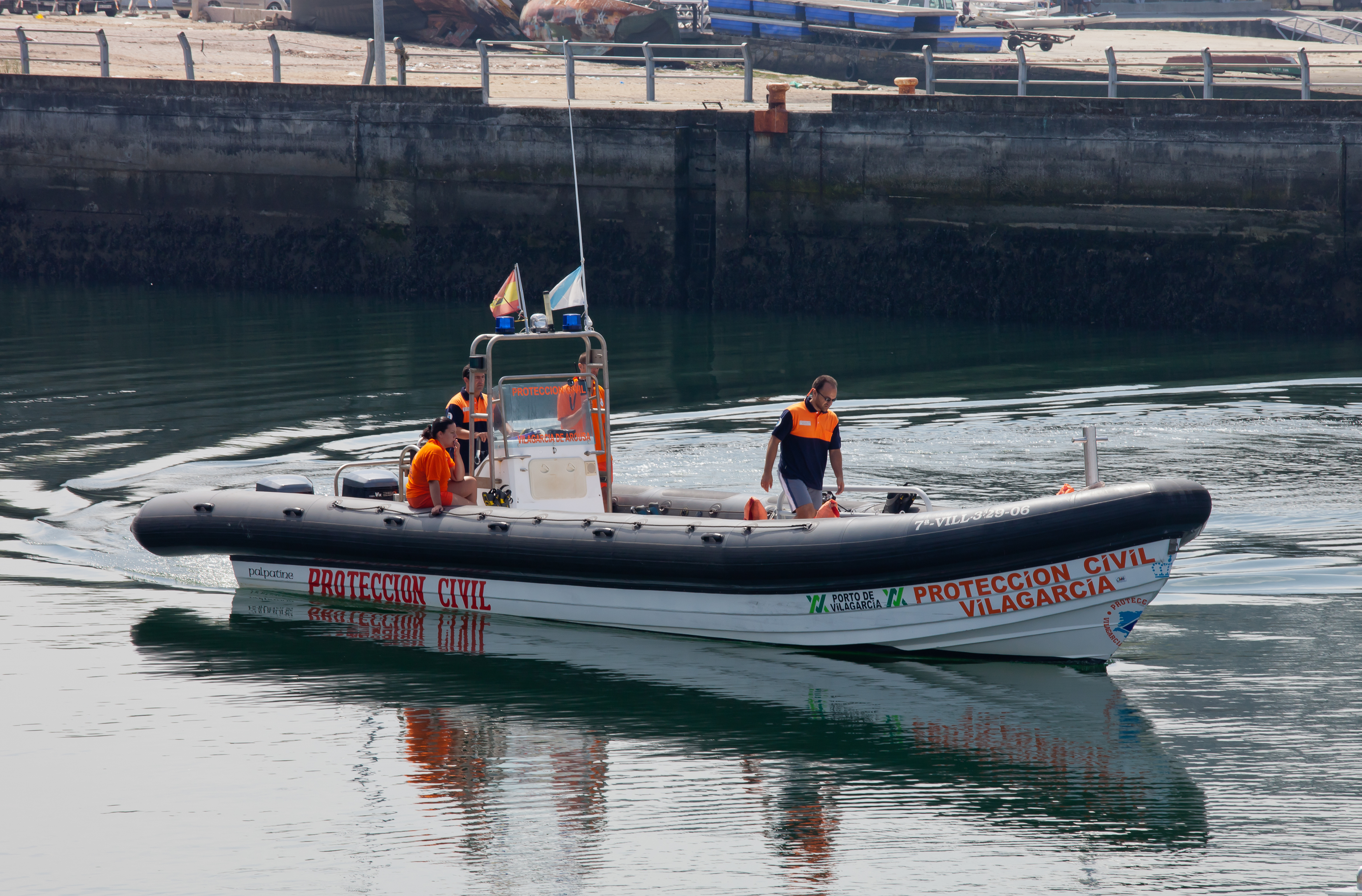
Civil Protection Boat

In 1967, the directorate-general was relegated to the rank of sub-directorate-general and integrated into the Directorate-General of the Civil Guard, which since 1943 had some units for these purpose. In this way, civil protection functions were assigned to the Ministry of the Interior. A 1968 Decree structured and granted powers to the sub-directorate, based on those already existing of the directorate-general. In addition, it developed and regulated its several units, maintained the service to its full extent, guaranteed the dissemination of the media, reinforced cooperation with the Civil Guard and respected the local and provincial character traditionally recognized for the fight against emergencies. Since 1976, the sub-directorate general became dependent on the Directorate-General for Internal Policy.

Already in 1980, during the term of Minister Juan José Rosón, the civil protection system was strengthened with the creation of a collective body to coordinate the action of the rest of departments, administrations and organizations, both public and private. This body was the National Civil Protection Committee. Likewise, the Directorate-General for Civil Protection was recovered and structured through a General Secretariat and the information, operational coordination and mobilization services. Civil governors assumed the coordination and provincial direction of civil protection. On September 14, 1981, the civil protection badge was created.

In July 1982, a new structure was approved based on two sub-directorates-general: one of Studies and Organization for conducting studies, for training and improvement of professional and volunteer staff, as well as assuming the secretariat of the National Committee and preparing the legislation; and a sub-directorate-general of Operations for operational intervention and drills. In January 1985, the first Civil Protection Act was passed. In 1999 a representative of the Nuclear Safety Council was integrated in the National Civil Protection Committee.

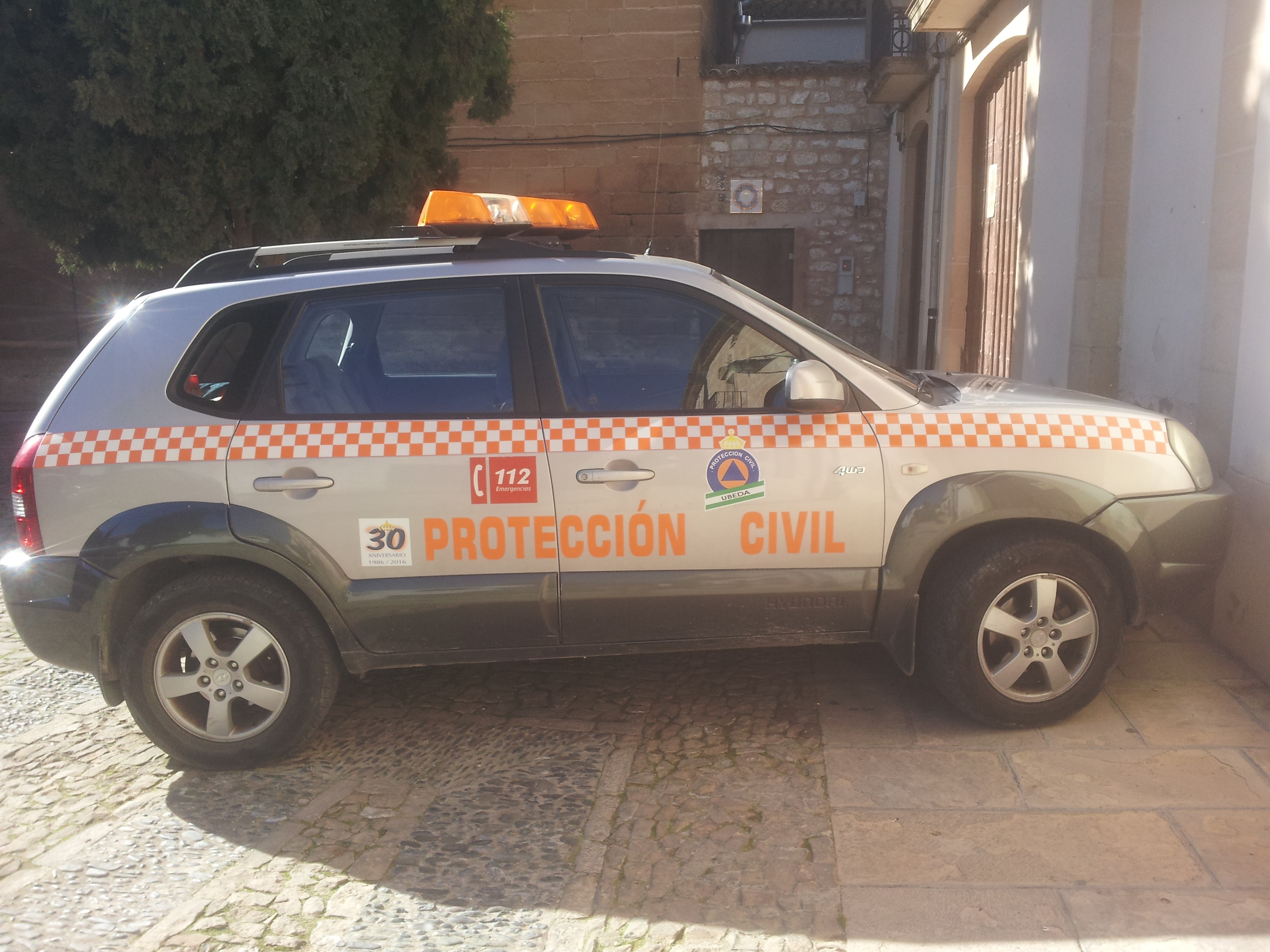
Civil Defence Vehicle in Úbeda, Andalusia.

It was in 2004 when the term “Emergencies” was added to the name of the directorate-general.

Since April 2026, the directorate-general is part of the General Secretariat for Civil Protection and Emergencies, a new body established to boost the government policy on emergencies.

== List of directors-general ==
| No. | Name | Term of office | |
| No. | Name | Start | End |
|---|---|---|---|
| 1 | Pardo de Santayana y Suárez | May 9, 1960 | May 18, 1967 |
| 2 | Ramón de Meer Pardo | May 18, 1967 | December 6, 1967 |
| 3 | Federico Gallo Lacarcel | July 28, 1980 | September 4, 1982 |
| 4 | Ezequiel Jaquete Molinero | September 4, 1982 | December 8, 1982 |
| 5 | Antonio Figueruelo Almazán | December 8, 1982 | November 30, 1987 |
| 6 | Antonio Martínez Ovejero | November 30, 1987 | September 3, 1988 |
| 7 | Pilar Brabo | September 3, 1988 | July 31, 1993 |
| 8 | Francisco Cruz de Castro | July 31, 1993 | June 1, 1996 |
| 9 | Juan San Nicolás Santamaría | June 1, 1996 | May 8, 2004 |
| 10 | Celia Abenza Rojo | May 8, 2004 | September 12, 2006 |
| 11 | Francisco Javier Velázquez López | September 12, 2006 | April 22, 2008 |
| 12 | Pilar Gallego Berruezo | May 1, 2008 | July 16, 2011 |
| 13 | María Victoria Eugenia Sánchez Sánchez | July 16, 2011 | February 4, 2012 |
| 14 | Juan Antonio Díaz Cruz | February 4, 2012 | June 30, 2018 |
| 15 | Alberto Herrera Rodríguez | June 30, 2018 | January 22, 2020 |
| 16 | Leonardo Marcos González | January 29, 2020 | June 13, 2023 |
| 17 | Francisco José Ruiz Boada | June 13, 2023 | December 13, 2023 |
| 18 | Virginia Barcones | December 13, 2023 | April 28, 2026 |
| 19 | Benjamín Salvago González | April 28, 2026 | Incumbent |

== National Civil Protection System ==
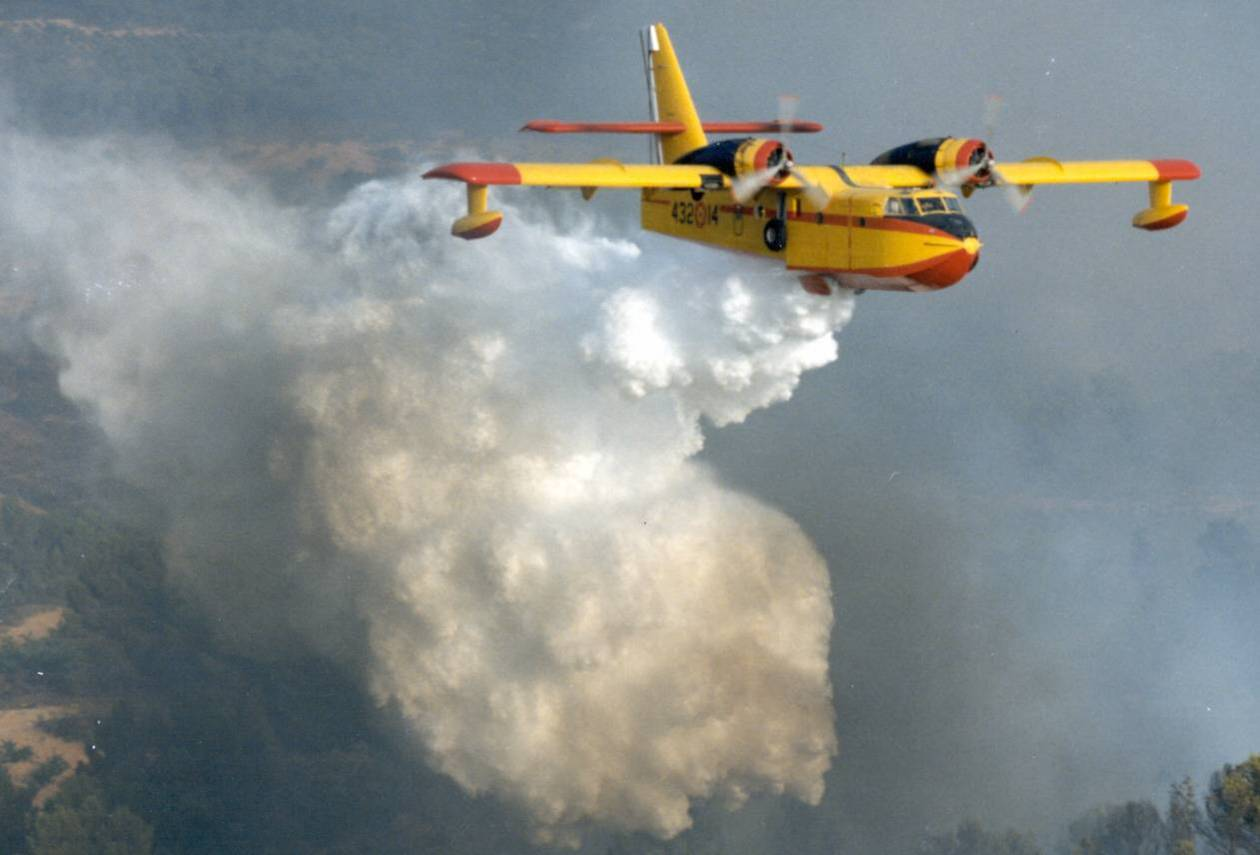
A Canadair CL-215 of the Spanish Air Force, dedicated to fight against wildfires.

The Spanish National Civil Protection System is structured through three levels: national, regional and local. It is currently regulated by the National Civil Protection System Act of 2015.

In the nationwide level, the Ministry of the Interior exercises the higher direction, coordination and inspection of the actions and resources used to accomplish with the civil protection plans. The Department do so through the Directorate-General for Civil Protection and Emergencies. Also, in the national level, it does exists the National Council on Civil Protection (formerly known as "National Civil Protection Committee"), integrated by representatives of all administrations to coordinate the civil protection, and the Civil Protection National School, where the personnel is formed and trained. The School also offers official grades and it develops R&D projects.

In the regional level, the autonomous communities are authorized to regulate its own civil defence systems, but always with a coordination body with representatives of all administrations and the higher coordination of the State. The State, and all the regions have their own Civil Protection Plan.

=== Military Emergencies Unit ===
The Military Emergencies Unit, created in 2005 has become a fundamental element of the System, intervening in all the most important national and international catastrophes since its creation. The National Civil Protection System Act, in its article 17, establishes the obligation of the Armed Forces to collaborate in case of disaster, and it does so through the mentioned unit. To request the assistance of the UME, the request has to be made by the minister of Home Affairs to the minister of Defence.

The Act also establishes that, in a case of a national interest emergency, the UME would assume the higher direction of the emergency under the orders of the minister of Home Affairs.

=== Duties and obligations of citizens ===
Spanish Medal of Civil Defence Merit.

All citizens, since the coming of age, are subject to the obligation to collaborate, personally and materially, in civil protection, in case of requirement by the competent authorities. This obligation consist in complying with the prevention and protection measures established by law to protect persons and goods when required.

In cases of serious risk, catastrophe or public calamity, all residents in the national territory are obliged to perform personal provisions required by the competent authority, without the right to compensation for this cause, and to comply with general or individuals orders that the authority dictates.

In 1982, the central government created the Medal of Merit of Civil Protection to "distinguish natural or legal persons that stand out for their activities in the protection, at preventive and operational level, of persons and property that may be affected by emergency situations in cases of serious risk, catastrophe or public calamity, by carrying out singular acts that involve notorious risk or exceptional solidarity, singular collaboration with the competent authorities in the direction and coordination of intervention resources in such circumstances or altruistic cooperation with them in actions of technical, pedagogical, research, economic or social purpose, as well as in continuous and relevant actions of interest for Civil Protection".

=== Ranks ===
| Coordinador Jefe (Chief Coordinator) | Jefe de Agrupación (Grouping Chief) | Subjefe de Agrupación (Grouping Deputy Chief) | Secretario de Agrupación (Grouping Secretary) | Jefe de Unidad (Unit Chief) | Jefe de Sección (Section Chief) | Jefe de Grupo (Group Chief) | Jefe de Equipo (Team Chief) | Voluntario (Volunteer) |

== Organization chart ==
To carry out its duties, the directorate-general has the following sub-directorates or deputy directorates-general:

- The Deputy Directorate-General for Foresight and Preparedness, responsible for functions related to prevention and training.
  - The National School of Civil Protection is attached to this body.
- The Deputy Directorate-General for Emergency Planning and Management, responsible for emergency planning, their operational management through the National Emergency Centre (CENEM), and the management of the response mechanism. It shall also act as the European and international operational focal point for emergencies.
  - The European Centre for Social Research on Emergency Situations (CEISE) is attached to this body.
- The Deputy Directorate-General for Resilience and Recovery, responsible for coordinating public policies for post-emergency recovery, managing state grants and financial assistance in the field of civil protection, as well as activities inherent to financial management and procurement of the Secretariat-General itself.

== See also ==
- Military Emergencies Unit
- Civil defense
- Civil defense by country
