= Pilar Brabo =

Spanish politician (1943–1993)

- Born: Pilar Brabo Castells; 28 February 1943; Madrid, Spain
- Died: 21 May 1993 (aged 50); Madrid, Spain
- Occupation: Politician
- Political party: Spanish Communist Party, Spanish Socialist Workers' Party

Pilar Brabo Castells (28 February 1943 – 21 May 1993) was a Spanish politician from the Spanish Socialist Workers' Party, previously from the Spanish Communist Party. She served as member of the first legislature of the Congress of Deputies, between 1977 and 1982. Also in 1989 she became director-general of the Spanish Civil defense, office she held until her death.
