= Ministry of the Interior (Spain) =

Government ministry of Spain

- Ministerio del Interior

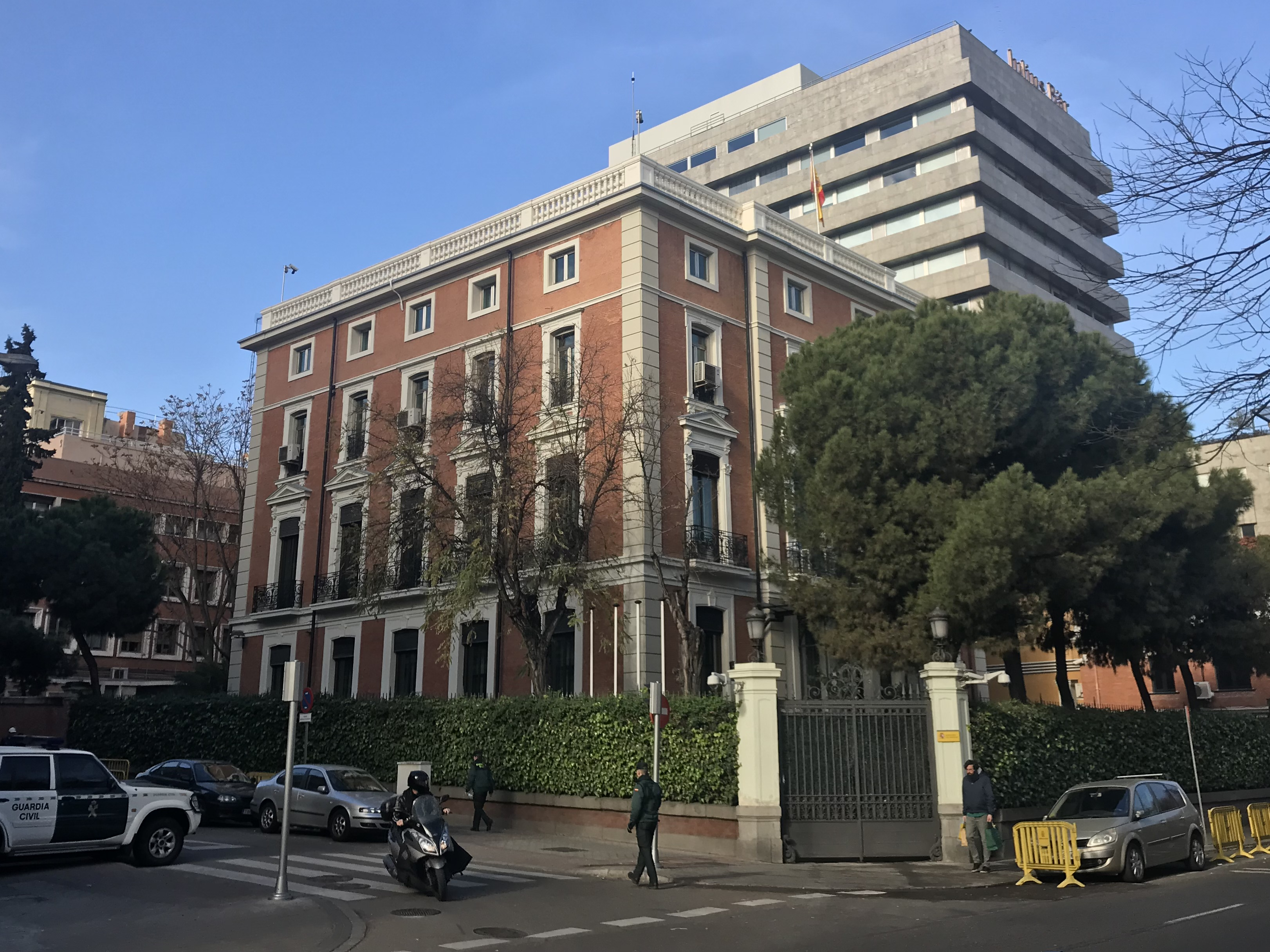
- The main headquarters

Agency overview
- Formed: 6 April 1812; 214 years ago (as Secretariat of State and of the Office of the Governance of the Kingdom)
- Type: Ministry
- Jurisdiction: Government of Spain
- Headquarters: Paseo de la Castellana, 5 Madrid
- Employees: 205,579 (2025)
- Annual budget: € 11.1 billion, 2026
- Minister responsible: Fernando Grande-Marlaska, Minister
- Agency executives: Aina Calvo, Secretary of State for Security; Ángel Luis Ortiz González, Secretary-General for Penitentiary Institutions; Susana Crisóstomo Sanz, Under-Secretary
- Child agencies: State Security Infrastructure and Equipment Office; National Police Corps; Civil Guard; CITCO
- Website: www.interior.gob.es

The Ministry of the Interior (MIR) is a department of the Government of Spain responsible for public security, the protection of the constitutional rights, the command of the law enforcement agencies, national security, immigration affairs, prisons, civil defense and road traffic safety. Through the Undersecretariat of the Interior and its superior body, the Directorate-General for Internal Policy, the Ministry is responsible for all actions related to ensuring political pluralism and the proper functioning of electoral processes.

The MIR, which was created for the first time by the Cortes of Cádiz in 1812, has its central headquarters since the 1970s in the Palace of the Counts of Casa Valencia, located at the Paseo de la Castellana. Likewise, the rest of the services are distributed between the buildings adjacent to this palace, which are also owned by the department, and other headquarters spread throughout the city of Madrid.

This department has historically received numerous denominations such as Ministerio de la Gobernación (literally Ministry of the Governance or Ministry of Government), Ministerio de Orden Público (Ministry of Public Order) and Ministerio del Interior y Justicia (Ministry of the Interior and Justice) when both ministries joint in one.

As of 2024, central, regional and local governments in Spain spend around €28.6 billion per year (1.8% of GDP) on security and public order. Furthermore, according to the Crime Balance for the fourth quarter of 2024, the conventional crime rate in Spain stood at 41 cases per thousand inhabitants, 0.3 points less than in 2023, while the cybercrime rate stood at 9.6 cases per thousand inhabitants.

== History ==
The Ministry of the Interior was created to handle matters relating to the governance of the Kingdom of Spain, a large area of responsibility that in the past had been assumed by the Councils of the Monarchy and which from the 18th century onwards ended up being centralized by the Council of Castile, whose numerous functions included assisting and collaborating with the monarch on government affairs.

In the 18th century, the extinction of the Habsburg dynasty and the arrival of the Bourbons brought profound institutional reforms. With King Philip V, this Council extended its jurisdiction to the territories of the Crown of Aragon and the whole country was ruled by the same institutions. Also during this time, the Councils started to lose importance and the Secretariats of State and of the Office were created. King Philip reformed the government and the First Secretariat of State —today known as Ministry of Foreign Affairs— was responsible for matter regarding the governance of the realm. However, depending on the king's confidence in his ministers, other departments could end up taking over these responsibilities. Thus, at different times, the heads of other Secretariats also assumed domestic governance, and even the Council of Castile, during the tenure of the Count of Aranda, regained significant prominence in this area.

However, the Peninsular War introduced into Spain, under French influence, the concept of internal government as its own entity, which would lead to the creation of a new ministry.

=== Nineteenth century ===
==== Origin: the Peninsular War ====
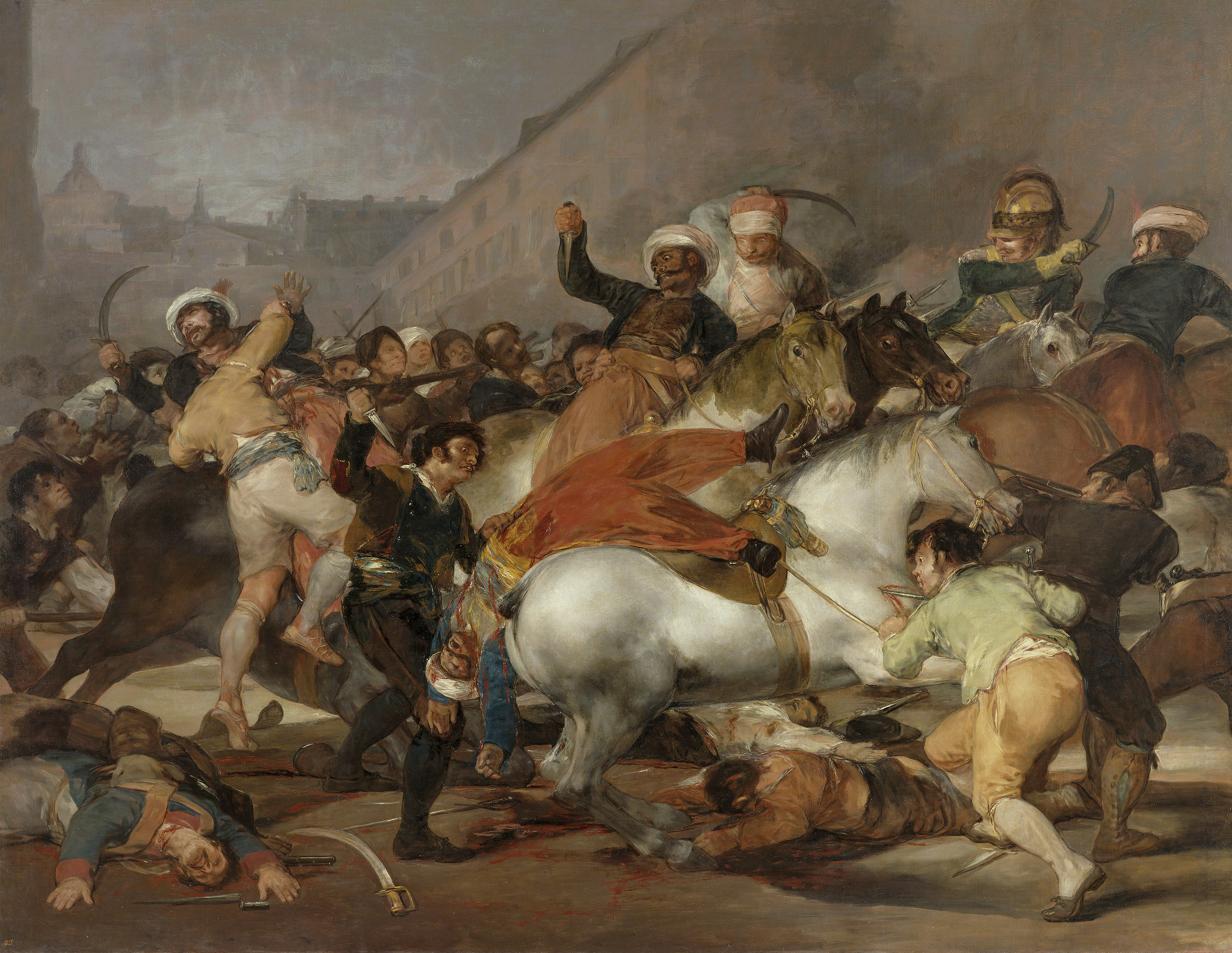
The Second of May 1808, by Francisco Goya

The uprising of the people of Madrid on 2 May 1808, extended the Napoleonic Wars to the Iberian Peninsula, in response to Napoleon's imposition of his brother, Joseph, on the Spanish throne.

From that moment on, Spain was divided into two factions, each with its own legal system. On the French side (Note: It was called the French side because of its leadership, but it wasn't made up solely of French people; it also included Spaniards who supported the government of Joseph Bonaparte. These Spaniards were known as afrancesados (pro-French).), the Bayonne Statute was approved, a charter granted by Joseph Bonaparte that adapted the Spanish political system to the French model, and created within its government a Ministry of the Interior and a Ministry of General Police. Meanwhile, on the Spanish side, the Cortes of Cádiz approved the Constitution of 1812, whose article 222 established a Secretariat of State and of the Office of the Governance of the Kingdom for the Peninsula and Adjacent Islands and another of the same characteristics for the Overseas territories, which were added to the pre-existing departments since the reign of Philip V (State, War, Grace and Justice, Navy and Indies and Finance). The vast majority of authors do not consider the department created by the Napoleonic government as the original one, because of its invasor nature.

For our purposes, the Secretariat of State and of the Office of the Governance of the Kingdom was regulated by Decree CXLV of 6 April 1812 of the Cortes, which established that this department was responsible for:

"of all matters pertaining to the political and economic government of the Kingdom, such as the municipal police of all towns without distinction, understood to mean the sanitation of supplies and markets, cleanliness and decoration of towns; all matters pertaining to public education, such as schools, colleges, universities, academies and other establishments of sciences and fine arts, according to the plan and regulations established by the Cortes; matters pertaining to roads, canals, bridges, irrigation ditches, draining of lagoons and swamps, and all public works of utility or ornamentation; health care; in all matters that the laws may pertain to the Government to promote and foster national agriculture and industry in all its branches, and in the public establishments of both. It shall have in its care the mines and quarries of all kinds that belong to the State; navigation and inland commerce; hospitals, prisons, houses of mercy and charity; the establishment of the boundaries of provinces and towns, and all matters pertaining to statistics and public economics; the general branch of mail and postal services throughout the Monarchy; the King's stamp, and that of the President of the Regency, and the provision of all the positions that correspond to the various branches that this Ministry comprises."

— Cortes of Cádiz, Decree CXLV of 6 April 1812

Despite the department's broad range of responsibilities, it lacked a fundamental one: public safety, which, at that time, was part of the Ministry of Justice. The first minister to hold this portfolio was José García de León y Pizarro.

==== A liberal ministry ====
The new department did not last long. Once the war was over and Ferdinand VII was restored to the throne, he annulled most of the measures implemented by the Cortes of Cádiz and reinstated absolutism. This was a severe blow to the liberals, who had been the main instigators of the Monarchy's administrative reforms and who had hoped that, after supporting Ferdinand's cause, he would accept a change of regime. Nothing could have been further from the truth; the king reinstated the Polysynodial System and abolished, among other bodies, the secretariats of government, returning to the pre-war situation.

Viewed as a liberal ministry, the Secretariat of Government was suppressed until 1820, when liberals rose up against the king following Rafael del Riego's uprising and forced him to reinstate the constitutional regime established by the 1812 Constitution. This included the restoration of a department dedicated exclusively to the affairs of the Kingdom's governance. During the brief period of the Liberal Triennium, several proposals were put forward to create police forces, such as the National Safeguard Legion. The instability of this period was evident in the ministerial appointments, with numerous officeholders, and it ended with the restoration of absolutism in 1823 thanks to the support the king received from the Hundred Thousand Sons of Saint Louis.

This ushered in the Ominous Decade, a dark period in Spanish history marked by repression of liberals. Once again, all traces of the reforms of the Liberal Triennium were eliminated, and although an attempt was made to reformulate a Ministry of the Interior called the Secretariat of the Interior (which encompassed both Peninsular and Overseas affairs), it lasted only a few months. Its sole head was José Aznárez Navarro.

The most relevant events of this period were the creation in 1824 of the General Police of the Kingdom, direct predecessor of the current National Police Corps, the creation of the Carabineros in 1829 —which in 1940 was integrated into the Civil Guard— and the succession issue, which caused King Ferdinand to make risky moves to secure the throne for his daughter Isabella, Princess of Asturias.

To achieve this, his government introduced some reforms, both in the academic and social spheres. As far as the administration of the Kingdom was concerned, the Sovereign had in mind since 1830 the creation of a Ministry of the Interior, an idea that was defended by relevant politicians of the time such as Javier de Burgos (1826), Pedro Sainz de Andino (1830), or his own finance minister, Luis López Ballesteros (1830), who called it "Secretariat of the Office of the Political Government". It encountered greater resistance among some justice ministers like José Antonio Larrumbide Urquidizar (1811) or José Cafranga Costilla (1832), who even resigned upon its creation, and even the Council of State (1830), whose report ended in a tie among its members.

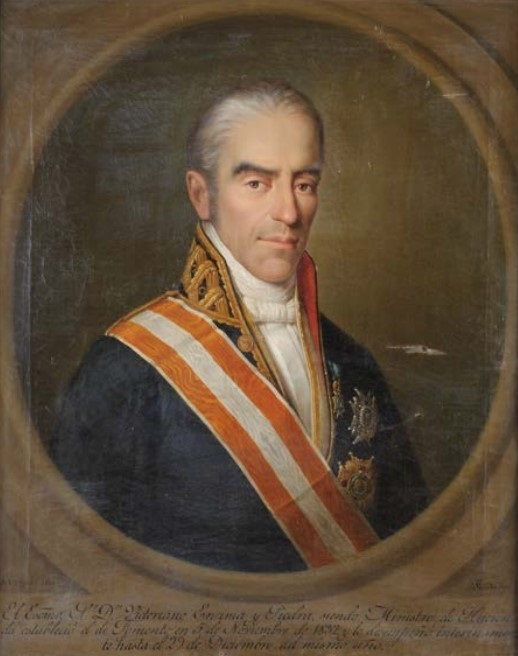
Minister Victoriano de Encima was acting interior minister in 1832 and established the structure of the Department at that time

Finally, by Royal Decree of 9 November 1832, the monarch re-established the Secretariat of State and of the Office, now called "of General Development of the Kingdom". The name's choice was not insignificant; an attempt was made to avoid both the term "Interior", due to its association with the French occupation, and the term "Government (or Governance)", linked to the liberals of Cádiz. The person in charge of setting up the department was the Minister of Finance, Victoriano de Encima, who assumed the position on an interim basis and designed how this Ministry would operate in its new phase. Following him, The Count of Ofalia was appointed permanent minister until October 1833, when Javier de Burgos, who had already advocated for the creation of the department in 1826, was appointed minister. This new Department was complemented by the creation of the position of sub-delegate of public works in the provinces and the division of these provinces carried out by minister Burgos in 1833.

==== From Interior to Governance ====
During the reign of Isabella II, and with the Queen Regent Maria Christina of the Two Sicilies acting in her name, the latter had no choice but to rely on the liberals to defend her daughter's right to reign. To this end, she promulgated a charter, the Royal Statute, which, for the first time, regulated a government separate from the Crown —although headed by it— and with a clearly differentiated head of the executive, the President of the Council of Ministers (prime minister). In this new phase, the liberals renamed the department in May 1834, reinstating the term "Interior" and the sub-delegates of public works became known as civil governors. A few months later, the Undersecretariat of the Interior was created with Ángel Vallejo Villalón as under-secretary, and the Ministry was relocated, moving to the former headquarters of the Council of the Supreme Inquisition, on Torija Street in Madrid.

Again, at the end of 1835, the name of the department was changed once more, becoming the "Department of Governance of the Kingdom". This new stage as the Ministry of Government began with a six-department organization, dedicated to the general affairs, local administration and services, police forces, prisons, public education, economic development, agriculture and public works.

Despite numerous reforms in the area of public safety, a feasible solution could not be found, and government protection was considered imperative to ensure the freedom of citizens; this was stated in a Decree of 26 January 1844, "civil liberty, continually exposed to individual manipulations and violence, does not seem to subsist firmly without the protective vigilance and robust support of the solicitous and vigorous authority of the government". In this regard, a few months later another decree was approved that created the Civil Guard, led at that time by The Duke of Ahumada, with a dual dependency of War and Governance.

==== Ministry of Development ====
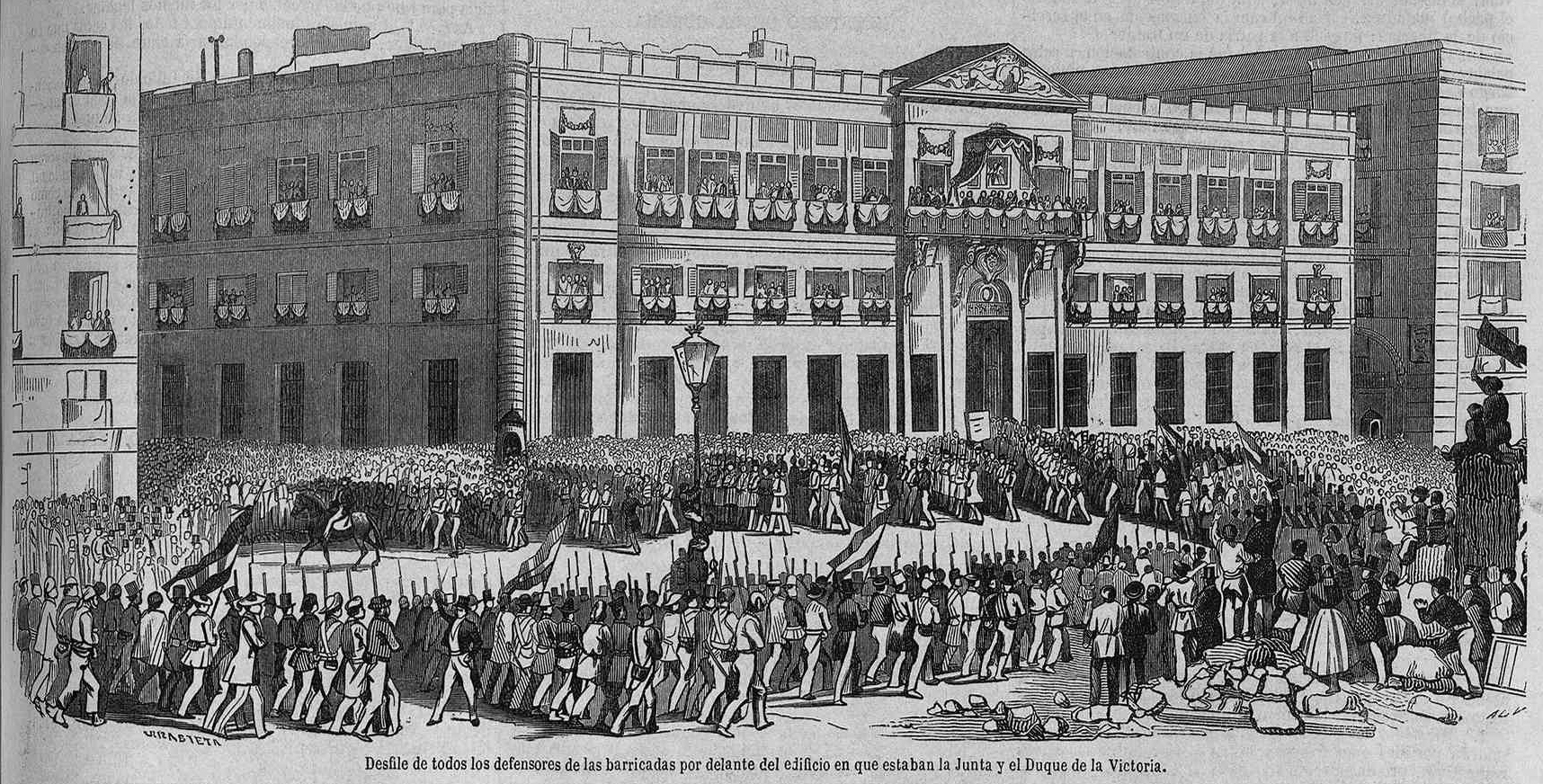
Engraving of a protest in front of the Ministry of Governance's headquarters in the context of the Spanish Revolution of 1854

By Royal Decree of 28 January 1847, the Secretariat of State and of the Office of Trade, Instruction and Public Works was created. This new ministry, which since 1851 was known as Ministry of Development, was created by assuming the Ministry of Interior powers related to public instruction, charity and public works, as well as those relating to commerce, which at that time was under the Ministry of the Navy. This distribution of powers did not take place as established by the decree of January 28th and, a week later, another one was carried out, which maintained the powers relating to charity in the Ministry of the Governance but removed those relating to the promotion of agriculture. Likewise, the Ministry of the Governance assumed responsibility for matters relating to the government of the overseas territories, which until then had been under the jurisdiction of the Navy.

By the end of that year, the department was handling matters related to internal government and administration, charity, prisons and health, as well as municipal and provincial accounting and budget. During this period, the dependence of the civil governors on this Ministry was notable, as the department controlled and manipulated elections through them during the era of turnismo, achieving the most advantageous results. José Posada Herrera, interior minister from 1858 to 1868 and, again, from 1865 to 1866, did it so blatantly that he was known at the time as the "grand elector".

In 1848, the Madrid Police Headquarters was established, considered the first police headquarters in Spain.

==== Stability in instability ====
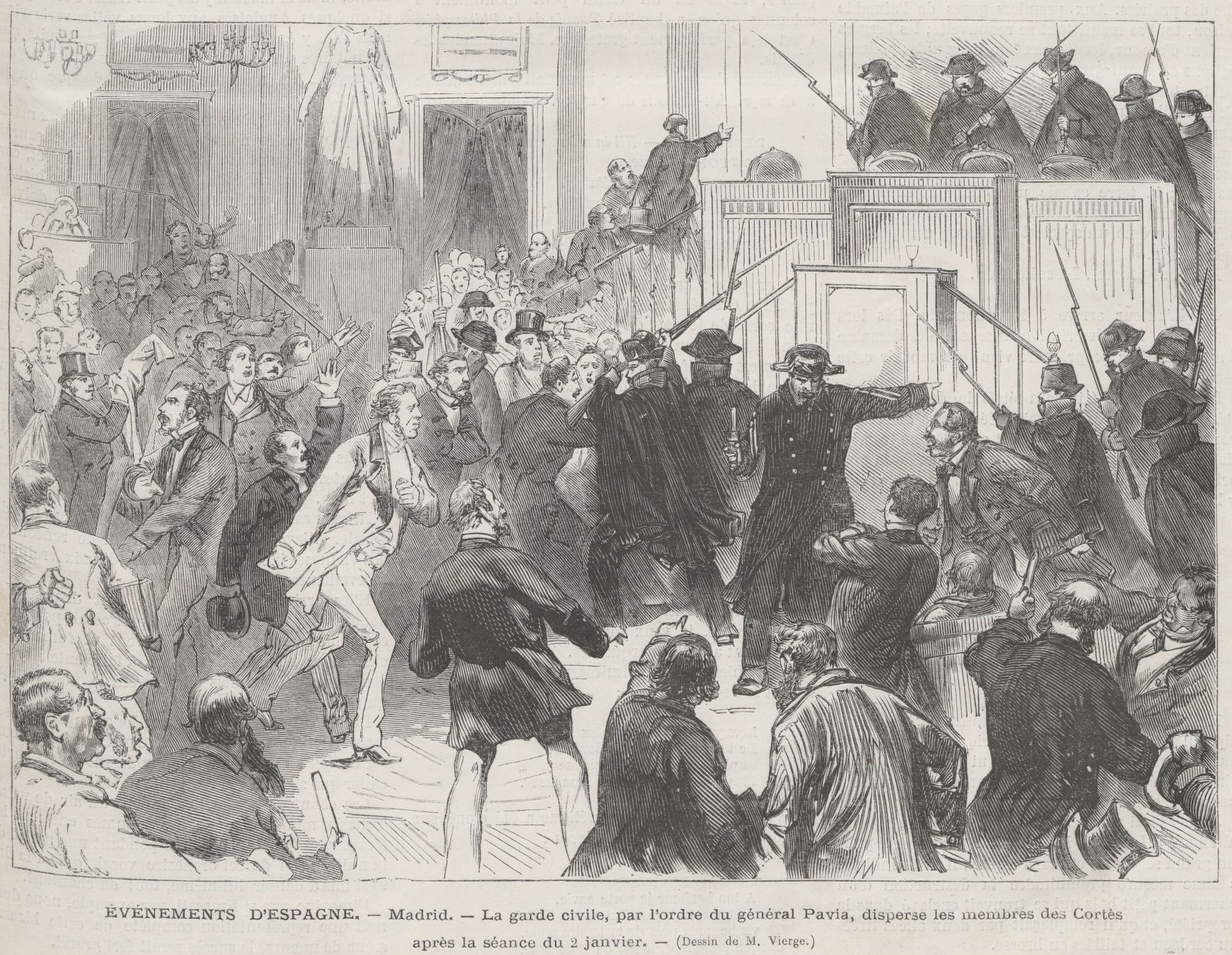
The Civil Guard, under orders from General Pavía, dissolving the Cortes in 1874

During the rest of the 19th century, the Ministry had relative stability in terms of organization, although it was one of the main departments in charge of managing the social unrest that existed throughout the end of the reign of Isabella II and the subsequent periods of Spanish history, such as the Democratic Sexennium or the First Republic.

Key events included the creation in 1868 of the drectorates-general of Administration and Policy, the merger of the directorates general of the Postal Service and Telegraphs, and the intermittent existence of a Directorate-General for Security. Also, during the Provisional Government, the Rural Guard was dissolved and its members integrated into the Civil Guard. Following the Spanish–American War, which resulted in the loss of the last Spanish territories in the Americas and Asia, the Civil Guard units stationed in Cuba, Puerto Rico, and the Philippines were dissolved, and their members were integrated into the national force.

=== Twentieth century ===
The early years of the 20th century were years of intense social reforms promoted by this department, such as the 1900 law on workplace accidents, the royal decree prohibiting workdays longer than eleven hours in June 1902, the creation of the Institute of Social Reforms (Spanish: Instituto de Reformas Sociales) and the approval of the law on the repression of child begging, both in 1903, and the approval of the law on child protection in 1904, the law on the protection of children and the law on Sunday rest in 1904, or the creation of the National Institute for Social Welfare (Spanish: Instituto Nacional de Previsión) in 1908.

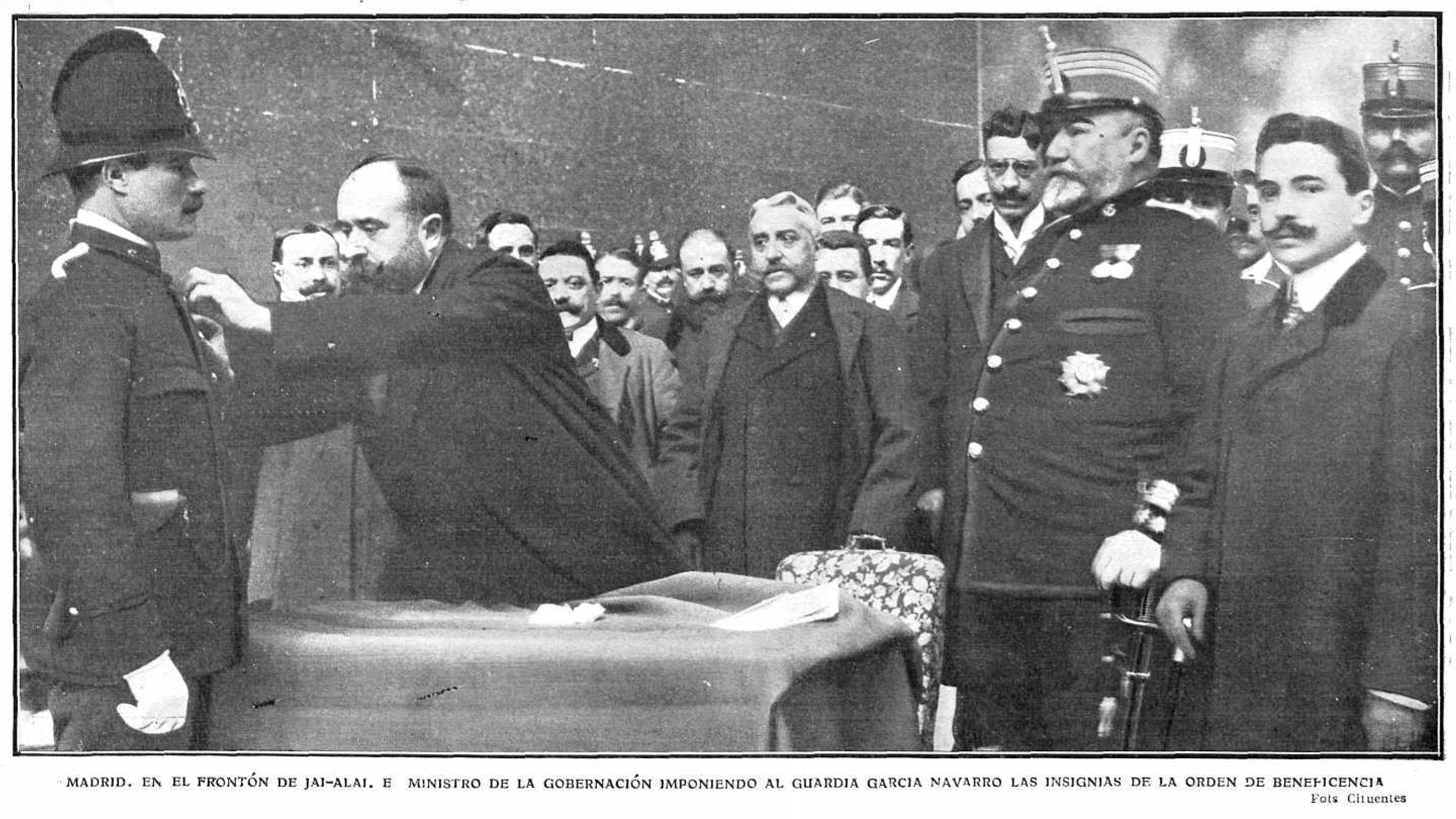
The minister Juan de la Cierva y Peñafiel, awarding the Cross of the Order of Beneficence to a Civil Guard officer. 1908

Social measures continued to increase, and the labour sector gained more importance in public policy. Because of this, during the third government of Eduardo Dato, the Ministry of Labour was created, assuming the labour responsibilities previously held by the Ministry of the Governance.

In 1928, during the dictatorship of Miguel Primo de Rivera, the department lost powers over mechanical road transport and supplies, which passed to the Ministry of Development and to the Ministry of National Economy, respectively.

During the Second Republic, by decree of the Presidency of the Council of Ministers of 16 August 1932, raised to the rank of Law on 8 September, the Directorate-General of the Civil Guard, which had been attached to the Ministry of War, and all the agencies and services of it dependents were transferred to the Ministry of the Interior. It lost some more powers, such as those related to mail, telegraphy and others related to communications, which passed to the new Ministry of Communications. Likewise, in 1933 the health and welfare responsibilities were transferred to the Ministry of Labour, which was renamed the Ministry of Labour, Health and Social Welfare and this situation remained until 1939 when, after the war was over, its functions returned to the department.

==== Civil war ====
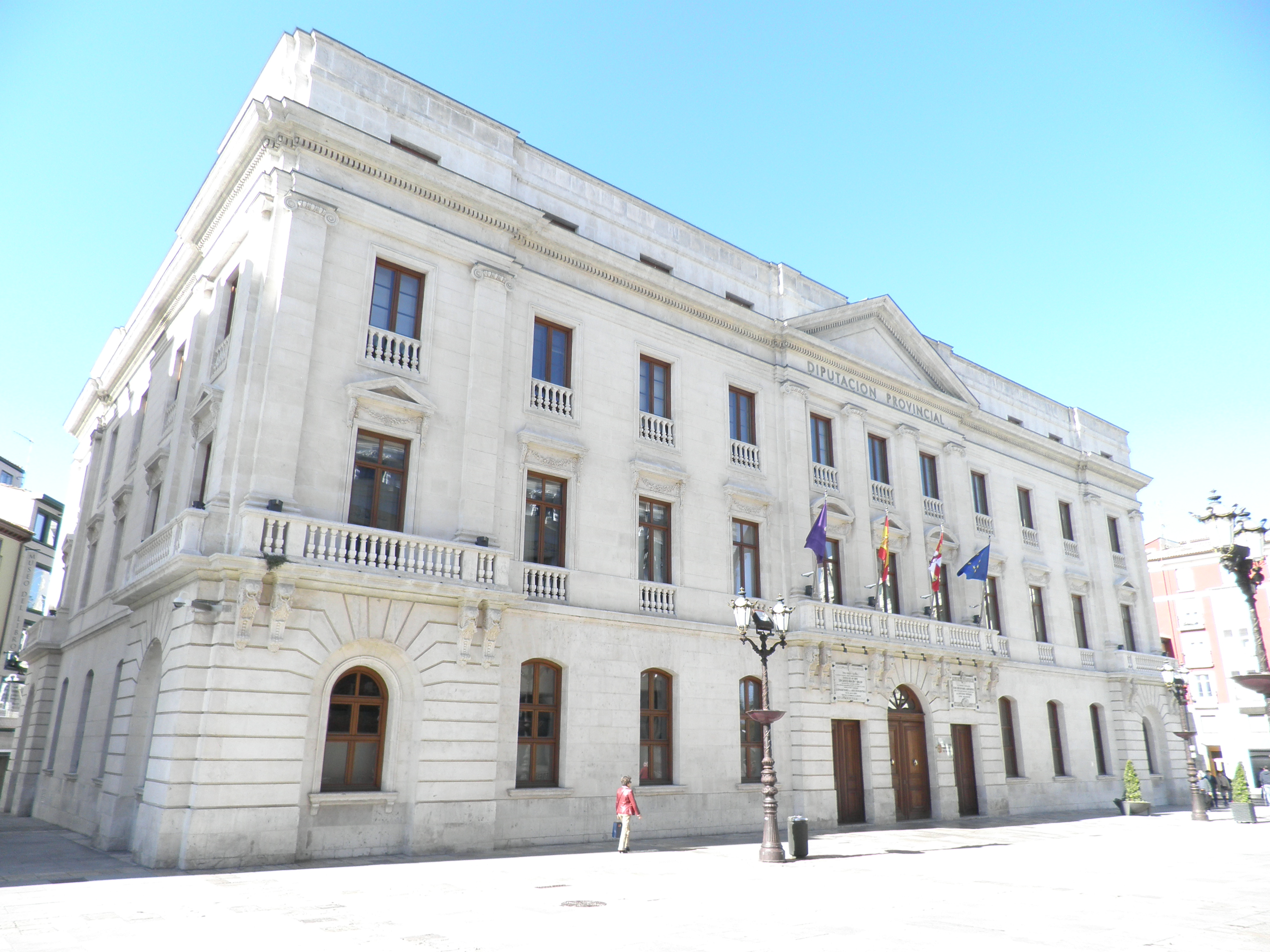
During the conflict, the first government of Francisco Franco installed the Ministry's headquarters in the Palace of the Provincial Government of Burgos

During the Spanish Civil War (1936–1939), each side structured its own government. On the Republican side, the traditional Ministry of the Governance was maintained, but with fewer powers since, as mentioned, it lost responsibilities for health, social welfare, and communications.

For their part, the Nationalist gave all the power to Francisco Franco, who in October 1936 established the office of Governor-General, responsible for "supervising the occupied provinces and everything related to the organization of civic life, supplies, work and charity". In January 1938, its responsibilities were split between the Ministry of the Interior, assuming matters relating to the internal government of the country, and the Ministry of Public Order, responsible for public safety. On 1 January 1939 the second one was abolished, transferring all its services to the first one and recovering its traditional name, Governance.

==== Dictatorship of Francisco Franco ====
During the remainder of Francisco Franco's dictatorship, the situation reverted to that prior to the Second Republic, with the Ministry of the Governance having responsibilities for domestic policy, local administration, charity, social assistance, health, public order, borders, traffic, mail and telecommunications, press, propaganda, censorship, and tourism. One of the most important bodies during the dictatorship was the Directorate-General for Security, which, based in the Royal House of the Post Office, directed and carried out much of the regime's repression.

During this period, the Carabineros —who during the war sided with the Republic— was abolished and absorbed by the Civil Guard and the civilian police was reorganized, creating the General Police Corps and the Armed and Traffic Police Corps.

In 1951 the Ministry of Information and Tourism was created, which assumed, among other functions, those of the Ministry of the Governance relating to press, propaganda, censorship and tourism. The same occurred in 1957 with the creation of the Ministry of Housing, which grouped into a single department the functions relating to housing, architecture, devastated regions and urban planning.

During the final years of the regime, some functions and bodies were defined. In 1959 the Central Traffic Office (Directorate-General for Traffic) was created by Law 47/1959, of 30 July; the Technical General Secretariat by Decree 1841/1960, and the Directorate-General for Civil Protection.

==== Democratic transition ====
With the dictator dead, in 1975 the Monarchy was restored in the person of Juan Carlos I, heir to the Bourbon dynasty, and with him began the transition to democracy which brought with it a profound reform of the police system and the Ministry of the Governance, which by Royal Decree 1558/1977, of July 4, was renamed Ministry of the Interior, a name commonly used in European countries.

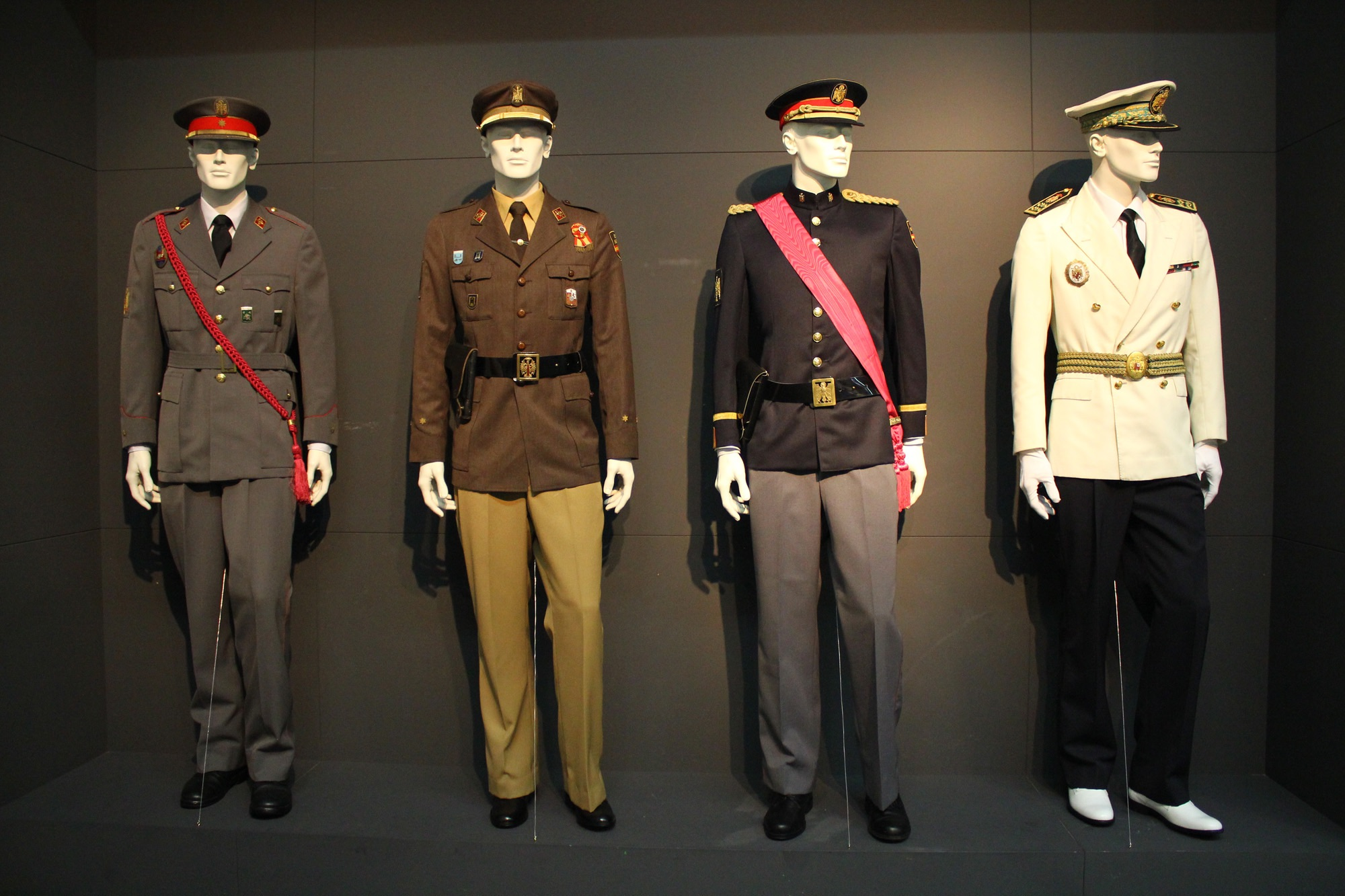
Uniforms of the different police forces (from left to right): Armed and Traffic Police Corps, National Police Corps (normal and dress uniform), and General Police Corps.

In addition to organizing the first election since the Second Republic, the department promoted the 1978 Police Act, which replaced the position of Under-Secretary of Public Order with that of Director of the State Security, which years later would be elevated to the rank of secretary of state and would eventually be called Secretary of State for Security. Similarly, the law demilitarized and replaced the police corps created during the dictatorship with two others, namely, the National Police Corps and the Superior Police Corps, and did the same with the Directorate-General for Security, which was replaced by the Directorate-General of the Police. Years later, Organic Law 2/1986, of March 13, on Security Forces and Corps, merged the two civilian police bodies into one, the current National Police Corps. As for the Civil Guard, there were no major changes beyond ratifying its dual dependence on the ministries of Defence and Interior.

At the same time, women were allowed access to the police forces. The Civil Guard did the same in 1988.

The reforms were not limited to the police and public safety affairs, but also affected the rest of the department's responsibilities. The same decree that renamed the Ministry gave it a more homogeneous character, leaving the Ministry of the Interior with its most characteristic powers: public safety and the political governance of the Kingdom, while the remaining functions were transferred to other departments. The directorates-general for Mail and Telecommunications and for Health, as well as the related agencies, were integrated into the new ministries of Transport and Communications and of Health and Social Security, respectively. The civil governors were also reformed, gradually losing powers to the autonomous communities and, in 1997, they were transformed into the current government sub-delegates.

In 1979 a new government department was created, the Ministry for Territorial Administration, which assumed the interior ministry's functions about relations with the Spanish regions, pre-regional entities and Local Administration, as well as the units and specific powers of the Directorate-General for Local Administration.[ Finally, the Ministry had to adapt to a decentralized State in which the possibility of creating regional police forces not dependent on the Ministry was foreseen, such as, among others, the Mossos d'Esquadra or the Ertzaintza.

It wasn't all about losing powers, since from 1977 gambling was regulated and responsibility for compliance with the rules fell to the Ministry of the Interior. Furthermore, at the end of 1993, it was given powers over the National Drugs Plan. It retained these powers until 2004.

==== Merger with justice ====
To end the century, an unusual event took place, namely the merging of the ministries of Justice and the Interior into one, giving rise to the Ministry of Justice and Interior. It only lasted two years and, although it was a short period of time, it left several changes and innovations that remain today.

On the one hand, to better manage its three main areas of responsibility —public safety, justice, and prisons— the same number of state Secretariats of state were established in 1994, notably the Secretariat of State for Justice, and at the same time the Directorate-General for International Legal Cooperation was established; both bodies are still active. On the other hand, the separation of the ministries in 1996 returned, after more than a century, to the pre-1887 situation regarding the prison system, as it was assigned to the Ministry of the Interior.

=== Twenty-first century ===
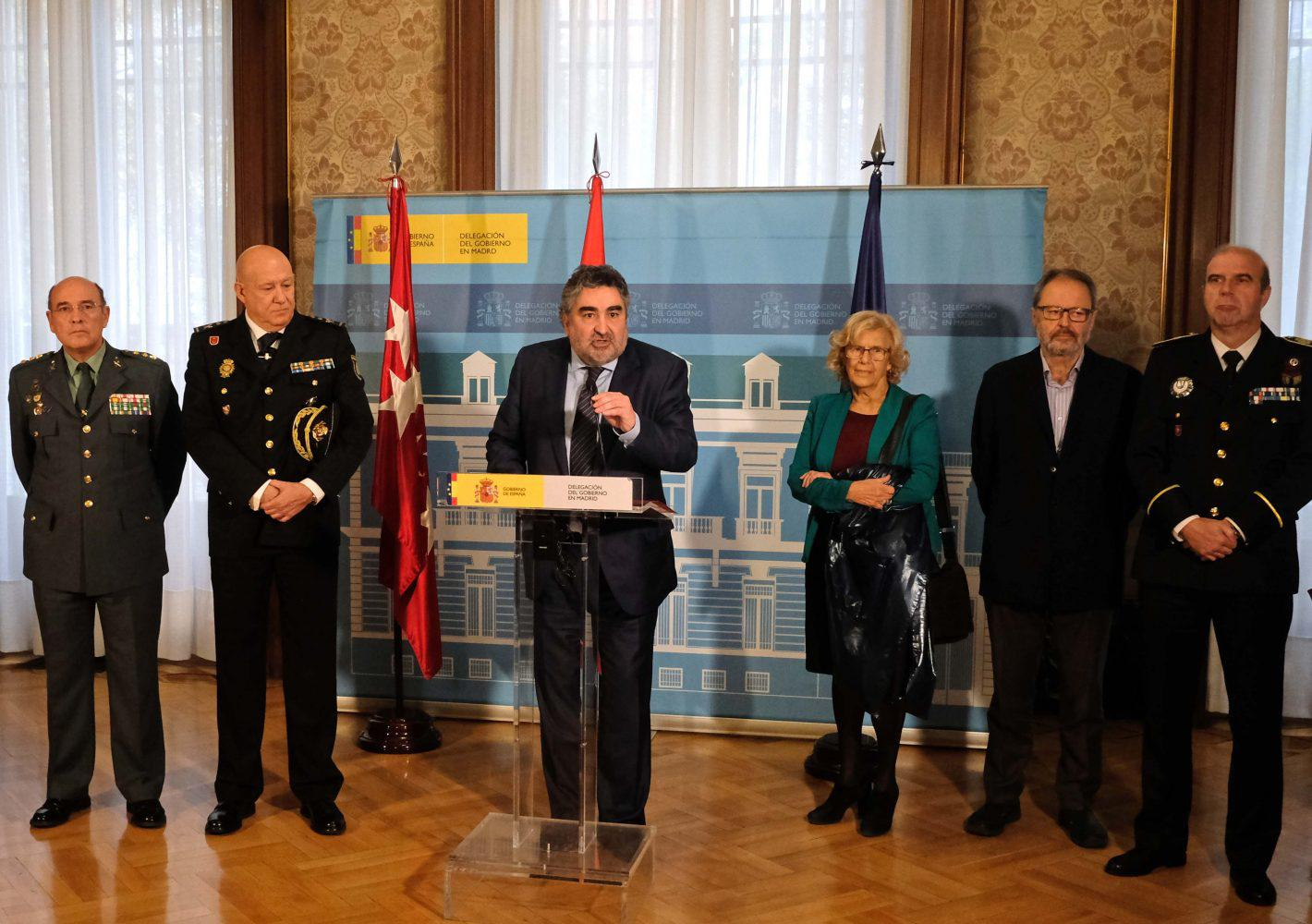
Press briefing by a government delegate along with other civil and police authorities. The delegates no longer hold the political power of the former civil governors, but they retain significant authority in matters of public safety

Today, the Ministry of the Interior maintains almost intact the responsibilities it possessed at the end of the last century, with the exception, as already mentioned, that since 1996, it also has powers over prisons and in 2004 it lost those relating to the National Drugs Plan. Likewise, in 1997 the position of civil governor was replaced by that of government sub-delegate, now reporting to a Government Delegate within the jurisdiction of an autonomous community. They ceased to be attached to the Ministry of the Interior and instead reported directly to the Prime Minister and functionally to the ministry responsible for territorial affairs. Despite this, since the Government Delegates and Sub-delegates, in addition to directing and supervising the bodies of the General State Administration in the different regions and provinces, also have responsibilities related to public safety and the exercise of fundamental rights, they remain partially dependent on the Ministry of the Interior for these matters.

In 2000, the Government Delegation for Foreigners and Immigration was created, but it was abolished in the following legislature and its functions transferred to the Ministry of Labour and Social Affairs. Not entirely, as it retains some through the Directorate-General for International Relations and Foreigners created in 2006 and, at the same time, the Directorate-General for Support to Victims of Terrorism was created, powers that the Ministry had for years but with the rank of deputy directorate-general.

==== Unified police command ====
In 2006, minister Alfredo Pérez Rubalcaba merged the directorates of the Police and of the Civil Guard, creating a unified command of the State Security Forces and Corps with a Directorate-General of the Police and the Civil Guard. This body had the objective of "carrying out the tasks entrusted to the State Security Forces and Corps in a more comprehensive, homogeneous and coordinated manner, thereby improving citizen security and the protection of the rights and freedoms of citizens".

This unification of command was the will of prime minister José Luis Rodríguez Zapatero and, in 2008, some reports indicated that Pérez Rubalcaba was not happy with this unification and that he wished to separate them again, but this was not an opinion shared by the prime minister.

At the end of 2011, the arrival to government of the conservative Mariano Rajoy and the appointment of Jorge Fernández Díaz as interior minister led to the separation of police command, recovering the two traditional governing bodies, which continued to be coordinated by the Secretary of State for Security. In July 2017, minister Juan Ignacio Zoido eliminated, within the police forces, the position of deputy director of operations —a technical position, second-in-command to the political director general—, a decision that was reversed by minister Fernando Grande-Marlaska in July of the following year.

==== Recent years ====
In 2008, responsibilities for prisons were elevated in rank with the creation of the General Secretariat for Penitentiary Institutions, that is complemented since 2018 by a Directorate-General for Criminal Enforcement and Social Reintegration. In 2011, it lost its powers over bullfighting, which were transferred to the Ministry of Culture.

In the most recent period, during the reign of Felipe VI, in 2021 the Coordination and Studies Office (1996) was elevated to the rank of directorate-general and, in 2022, a University Training Center of the National Police was founded. Also, in 2023 a Directorate-General for International Protection was created in response to the drastic workload increase in this area.

In April 2026, the civil protection area was elevated to a higher administrative level with the establishment of a General Secretariat for Civil Protection and Emergencies, under which the existing Directorate-General for Civil Protection and Emergencies was placed, with a view to strengthening the government's emergency response capacity.

== Organization ==
Organizational chart of the Spanish Ministry of the Interior, February 2024

The minister of the interior, a member of the Council of Ministers, is the ultimate authority in Spain responsible for public safety, the free exercise of constitutional rights and prisons. In this sense, the minister establishes the department's policies and assumes responsibility for their implementation.

To exercise this powers, the minister is assisted by the secretary of state for security, the director—by the minister's delegation— of all State security services. The minister is also assisted by the secretary-general for penitentiary institutions, the secretary-general for civil protection and emergencies, and the Ministry's under-secretary, who manages the department on a daily basis.

As of 2026, this is the organization of the Ministry:

Ministry Organization (2026)
Minister	Cabinet (Chief of Staff)
Secretary of State for Security	Directorate-General of the Police
Secretary of State for Security	National Police Corps
Secretary of State for Security	Directorate-General of the Civil Guard
Secretary of State for Security	Civil Guard
Secretary of State for Security	Directorate-General for International Relations and Immigration
Secretary of State for Security	Directorate-General for Coordination and Studies
Secretary of State for Security	Intelligence Center for Counter-Terrorism and Organized Crime
Secretary of State for Security	State Security Infrastructure and Equipment Agency
Secretary-General for Penitentiary Institutions	Directorate-General for Criminal Sentence Enforcement and Social Reintegration
Secretary-General for Penitentiary Institutions	Penitentiary Work and Employment Training
Secretary-General for Civil Protection and Emergencies	Directorate-General for Civil Protection and Emergencies
Under-Secretary	Technical General Secretariat
Under-Secretary	Directorate-General for Internal Policy
Under-Secretary	Directorate-General for Traffic
Under-Secretary	Directorate-General for Support to Victims of Terrorism
Under-Secretary	Directorate-General for International Protection
Under-Secretary	Technical Cabinet
Under-Secretary	Budget Office

== Headquarters ==
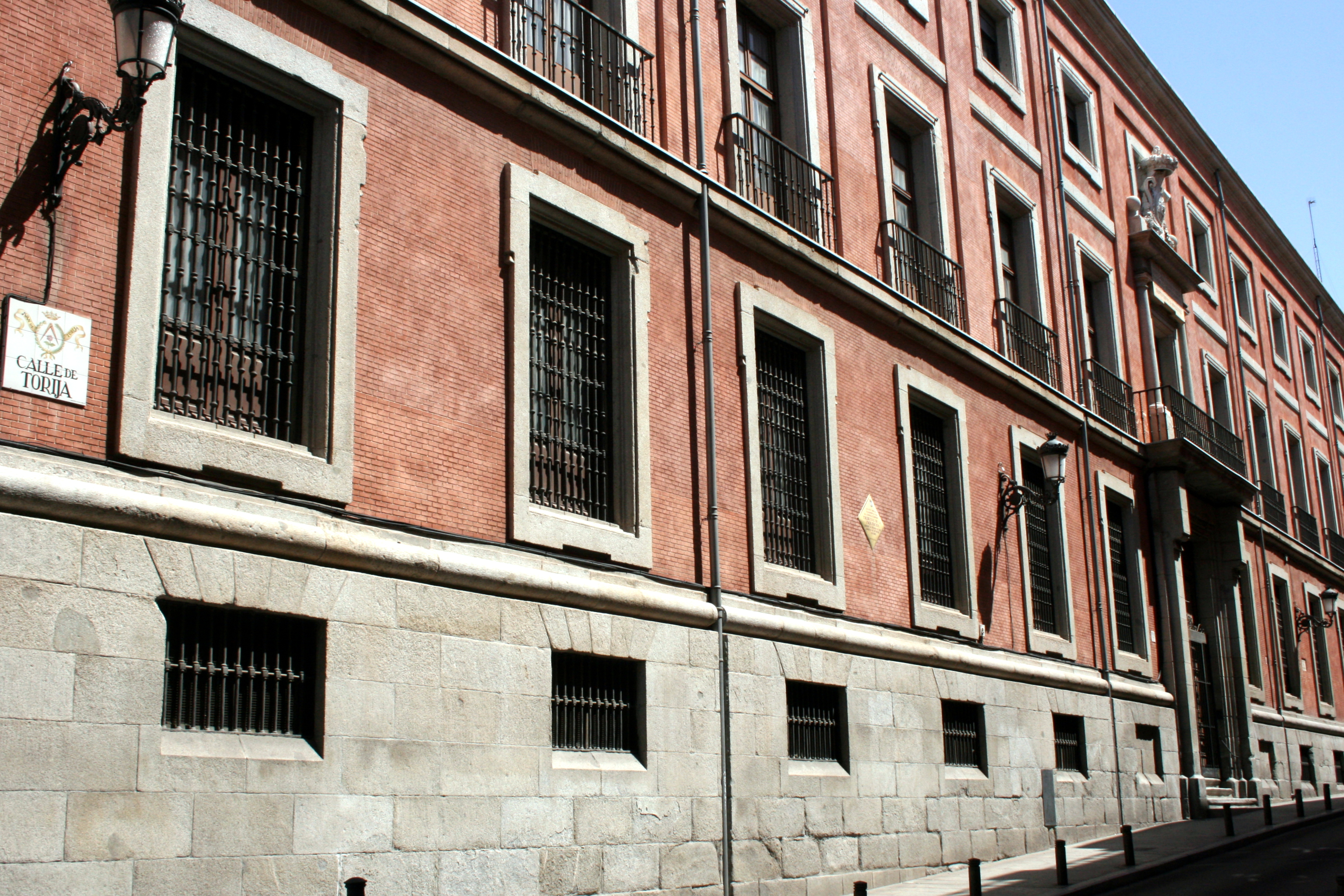
Former palace of the Council of the Supreme Inquisition. It housed the Department between 1832 and 1847.

Like the other ministries created before the second half of the 19th century, the department's original location was in the basements of the Royal Palace of Madrid. When it was re-established at the end of the reign of Ferdinand VII, in 1832, its headquarters were located in the former building of the Council of the Supreme Inquisition (which since 2008 belongs to the Senate), until 1847, when it moved to the Royal House of the Post Office.

At the Puerta del Sol's emblematic building, it shared space with Correos, which provided its services on the ground floor. During its time there, in addition to being known as the Governance Building, the property underwent several renovations, most notably the construction of the current clock tower (famous for its connection to the Twelve Grapes tradition). After the end of the Civil War in 1939, the dictatorial government moved the Ministry's headquarters to a building on Amador de los Ríos Street, although it retained the original building as one of its offices, housing the Directorate-General for Security.

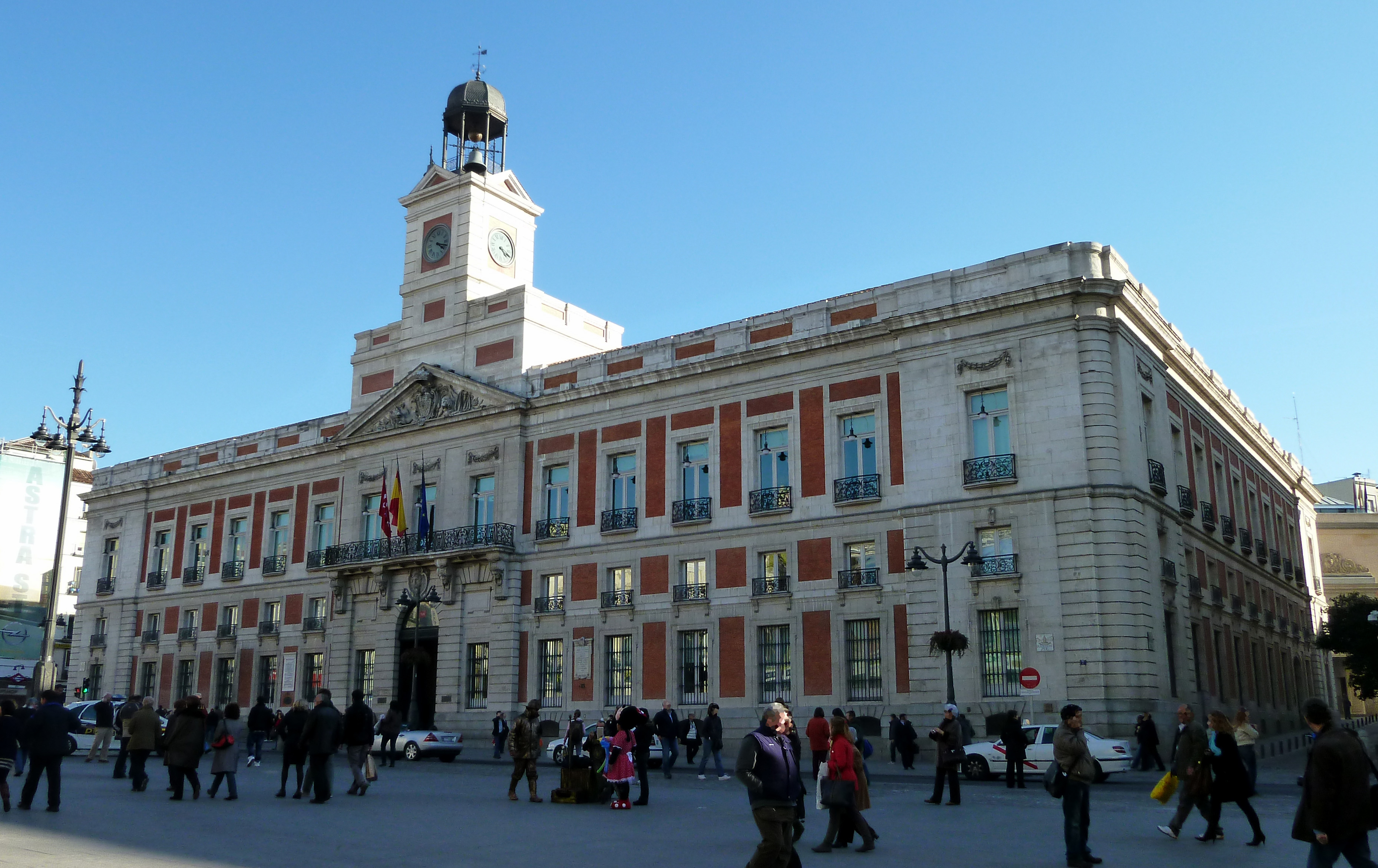
The Royal House of the Post Office. Today, it houses the Regional Government of Madrid.

In 1976, the Office of the Prime Minister ceded to the Ministry of the Interior the small palace located at the number 5 of Paseo de la Castellana, a building close to the headquarters of the department that until then housed the Directorate-General for the Promotion of the Sahara (previously known as Directorate-General for Morocco and Colonies). Years later, in 1990, the Ministry continued to expand its headquarters by acquiring another adjacent building on Amador de los Ríos Street.

Following the transfer of the Royal House of the Post Office to the newly established Government of the Community of Madrid in 1985, the Ministry was left with two main headquarters, the Palace of the Counts of Casa Valencia (Castellana 5) and the Palace of the Marquess of Argüeso and Bassecourt (Amador de los Ríos 7 and surrounding areas).

=== Other headquarters ===
In addition to its two main headquarters, the Department of the Interior, due to its size, has its own headquarters for various bodies and agencies; these are:

- The palace located at 5 Miguel Ángel Street, which houses the central offices of the National Police Corps.
- A complex at 110 Guzmán el Bueno Street, which houses the central offices of the Civil Guard.
- A building at 38–40 Alcalá Street, headquarters of the General Secretariat for Penitentiary Institutions.
- A building at 40 Pradillo Street, headquarters of the Directorate-General for International Protection.
- A building at 8 Amador de los Ríos Street, which houses the directorates-general for Support to Victims of Terrorism and for International Relations and Foreigners.
- A building at 28 and 44 Josefa Valcárcel Street, headquarters of the Directorate-General for Traffic.
- A building at 21 Quintiliano Street, which houses the Directorate-General for Civil Protection and Emergencies.
- The third floor of a multi-purpose building on Evaristo San Miguel Street, which houses the State Security Infrastructure and Equipment Office.
- The "Technological Security Center (CETSE)" complex, which houses the Deputy Directorate-General for Security Information and Communications Systems.

== Budget ==
In millions of euros (€)
1. Citizen security 7,417 (66.7%)
2. Penitentiary Centers and Institutions 1,326 (11.9%)
3. Road safety 844 (7.59%)
4. Police training & reserve personnel 484 (4.35%)
5. Elections and political parties 462 (4.16%)
6. General services 443 (3.98%)
7. Drug trafficking 108 (0.97%)
8. Civil protection 17 (0.15%)
9. International protection 16 (0.14%)

For fiscal year 2026, the Ministry of the Interior has a consolidated budget of €11,116 million.

Of the ten programs that Section 16 (Ministry of the Interior) of the budget has, it stands out Program 132A "Citizen security", with 7.42 billion, Program 133A "Penitentiary Centers and Institutions" with 1.33 billion and Program 132B "Road safety" with 844 million.

The rest of the budget is allocated to other police policies (training and reserve personnel), digitalization, international protection, civil protection, elections and political party issues and general affairs.

=== Audit ===
The Ministry's accounts, as well as those of its agencies, are internally audited by the Office of the Comptroller General of the State (IGAE), through a Delegated Comptroller's Office within the department itself. Externally, the Court of Auditors is responsible for auditing expenditures. Likewise, the Congress of Deputies and Senate Interior Committees exercise political control over the accounts.

== See also ==
- List of interior ministers of Spain
- Law enforcement in Spain
- List of prisons in Spain
- Elections in Spain
- Terrorism in Spain
- Migration and asylum policy of the European Union
- Order of Police Merit
- Order of Merit of the Civil Guard
- Royal Order of Civil Recognition to Victims of Terrorism

== Bibliography ==
- Rojas Juárez, José Rafael; de Andrés Díaz, Rosana (2015). "Ministerio del Interior: Dos siglos de historia" [Ministry of the Interior: Two centuries of history] (PDF). Ministry of the Interior (in Spanish). Bilbao. Archived from the original (PDF) on 1 December 2025.
