= List of prisons in Spain =

Spain has a total of 92 prisons, also called penitentiary centers or penitentiary establishments. They report to the General Secretariat for Penitentiary Institutions, a department of the Ministry of the Interior, with the exception of those located in the regions of Catalonia and the Basque Country, due to the delegation of powers from the Spanish government in 1984 and 2021, respectively. Social insertion centers are not included. There are only two penitentiary psychiatric hospitals in Spain, one in Seville and the other in Foncalent (Alicante).

== Prisons in Spain by autonomous community (includes autonomous cities) ==
Region	Prison	Coordinates
Andalusia	Penitentiary Center of Alcalá de Guadaira (Sevilla Mujeres)	37°20′4.07″N 5°47′35.02″W
Andalusia	Penitentiary Center of Algeciras (Botafuego)	36°8′40.96″N 5°29′10.28″W
Andalusia	Penitentiary Center of Almería (Acebuche)	36°51′58.82″N 2°18′12.44″W
Andalusia	Penitentiary Center of Córdoba	37°54′13.78″N 4°40′22.34″W
Andalusia	Penitentiary Center of Granada (Albolote)	37°19′46.88″N 3°40′22.99″W
Andalusia	Penitentiary Center of Huelva	37°19′7″N 6°52′58.53″W
Andalusia	Penitentiary Center of Jaén	37°51′39.72″N 3°46′16.15″W
Andalusia	Penitentiary Center of Málaga	36°40′29.09″N 4°35′1.34″W
Andalusia	Penitentiary Center of Sevilla I	37°23′23.12″N 5°50′44.1″W
Andalusia	Penitentiary Center of Sevilla II - Morón de la Frontera	37°9′39.41″N 5°24′26.46″W
Andalusia	Penitentiary Center Málaga II - Archidona	37°3′44.25″N 4°21′44.5″W
Andalusia	Penitentiary Center Psiquiátrico de Sevilla	37°23′24.66″N 5°50′51.53″W
Andalusia	Penitentiary Center Puerto I	36°39′41.6″N 6°14′50.35″W
Andalusia	Penitentiary Center Puerto II	36°39′45.29″N 6°14′54.87″W
Andalusia	Penitentiary Center Puerto III	36°39′58.61″N 6°15′28.31″W
Aragon	Penitentiary Center of Daroca	41°6′43.06″N 1°22′33.56″W
Aragon	Penitentiary Center of Teruel	40°20′59.06″N 1°7′6.77″W
Aragon	Penitentiary Center of Zaragoza - Zuera	41°57′14.3″N 0°42′9.82″W
Canary Islands	Penitentiary Center of Arrecife	28°59′58.76″N 13°31′54.3″W
Canary Islands	Penitentiary Center of La Palma	28°40′47.9″N 17°46′10.6″W
Canary Islands	Penitentiary Center of Las Palmas	28°3′35.39″N 15°26′7.77″W
Canary Islands	Penitentiary Center of Las Palmas II	27°48′35.83″N 15°27′40.31″W
Canary Islands	Penitentiary Center of Tenerife II	28°27′12.04″N 16°20′33.11″W
Cantabria	Penitentiary Center El Dueso	43°27′35.25″N 3°27′22.36″W
Castile and León	Penitentiary Center of Ávila	40°41′27.52″N 4°37′45.51″W
Castile and León	Penitentiary Center of Burgos	42°20′58.61″N 3°45′1.16″W
Castile and León	Penitentiary Center of Dueñas - La Moraleja	41°51′21.43″N 4°30′44.63″W
Castile and León	Penitentiary Center of Mansilla de las Mulas	42°30′3.16″N 5°21′40.28″W
Castile and León	Penitentiary Center of Segovia	40°56′4.65″N 4°9′53.26″W
Castile and León	Penitentiary Center of Soria	41°47′57.81″N 2°29′52.5″W
Castile and León	Penitentiary Center of Topas	41°11′49.18″N 5°41′39.44″W
Castile and León	Penitentiary Center of Valladolid	41°44′18.75″N 4°49′31.42″W
Castilla–La Mancha	Penitentiary Center of Albacete («La Torrecica»)	39°0′38.05″N 1°47′32.05″W
Castilla–La Mancha	Penitentiary Center of Alcázar de San Juan	39°23′58.22″N 3°12′58.51″W
Castilla–La Mancha	Penitentiary Center of Cuenca	40°4′40.21″N 2°11′5.63″W
Castilla–La Mancha	Penitentiary Center of Herrera de la Mancha	39°3′44.44″N 3°15′36.48″W
Castilla–La Mancha	Penitentiary Center of Ocaña I	39°57′19.05″N 3°29′57.75″W
Castilla–La Mancha	Penitentiary Center of Ocaña II	39°57′7.92″N 3°29′51.61″W
Catalonia	Barcelona Men's Penitentiary Centre (Cárcel Modelo de Barcelona) (Note: Closed in 2017.)	41°22′57.82″N 2°8′39.82″E
Catalonia	Risks 1 Penitentiary Centre	41°28′3.1″N 1°53′2.09″E
Catalonia	Penitentiary Center of Brians 2	41°28′21.65″N 1°52′52.7″E
Catalonia	Barcelona Women's Penitentiary Centre (Wad-Ras)	41°23′37.41″N 2°11′50.18″E
Catalonia	Puig de les Basses Penitentiary Centre	42°17′1.05″N 2°56′18.25″E
Catalonia	Penitentiary Center of Girona	42°0′22.93″N 2°49′23.19″E
Catalonia	Barcelona Juvenile Penitentiary Centre	41°34′36.76″N 2°17′46.97″E
Catalonia	Penitentiary Centre of Lledoners	41°45′38.83″N 1°48′27.53″E
Catalonia	Penitentiary Centre of Ponent	41°37′24.17″N 0°36′29.37″E
Catalonia	Penitentiary Centre Mas d'Enric	41°9′13.83″N 1°17′19.35″E
Catalonia	Tarragona Open Penitentiary Centre (Note: Closed in 2015.)	41°7′21.03″N 1°14′29.24″E
Catalonia	Barcelona Open Penitentiary Centre	41°27′14″N 2°11′30″E
Catalonia	Lleida Open Penitentiary Centre	41°37′23.25″N 0°36′32.04″E
Catalonia	Penitentiary Centre Quatre Camins	41°34′43.77″N 2°17′37.93″E
Catalonia	Terrassa Hospital Prison	41°33′24.41″N 2°3′9.64″E
Ceuta	Penitentiary Center of Ceuta II	35°52′48.45″N 5°21′22.18″W
Madrid	Penitentiary Center Madrid I - Alcalá mujeres	40°31′19.64″N 3°19′47.81″W
Madrid	Penitentiary Center Madrid II - Alcalá Meco	40°31′24.39″N 3°19′49.24″W
Madrid	Penitentiary Center Madrid III - Valdemoro	40°13′10.37″N 3°39′32.65″W
Madrid	Penitentiary Center Madrid IV - Navalcarnero	40°17′28.02″N 3°57′36.7″W
Madrid	Penitentiary Center Madrid V - Soto del Real	40°43′8.15″N 3°46′59.79″W
Madrid	Penitentiary Center Madrid VI - Aranjuez	39°57′11.72″N 3°42′9.25″W
Madrid	Penitentiary Center Madrid VII - Estremera	40°6′51.32″N 3°4′33.6″W
Valencian Community	Penitentiary Center Castellón II - Albocácer	40°22′6.64″N 0°0′13.67″E
Valencian Community	Penitentiary Center of Alicante Cumplimiento	38°21′6.59″N 0°33′48.72″W
Valencian Community	Penitentiary Center of Alicante II - Villena	38°43′3.34″N 0°55′39.42″W
Valencian Community	Penitentiary Center of Alicante Psiquiátrico	38°21′0.69″N 0°33′48.19″W
Valencian Community	Penitentiary Center of Castellón	40°0′1.04″N 0°5′47.56″W
Valencian Community	Penitentiary Center of Valencia - Picassent	39°18′51.2″N 0°26′7.15″W
Extremadura	Penitentiary Center of Badajoz	38°49′49.65″N 7°2′7.91″W
Extremadura	Penitentiary Center of Cáceres	39°28′22.53″N 6°20′10.08″W
Galicia	Penitentiary Center of A Lama (Pontevedra)	42°24′21.41″N 8°27′15.54″W
Galicia	Penitentiary Center of Bonxe (Lugo)	43°6′10.23″N 7°34′53.17″W
Galicia	Penitentiary Center of Monterroso (Lugo)	42°48′32.01″N 7°46′10.95″W
Galicia	Penitentiary Center of Pereiro de Aguiar (Ourense)	42°18′0.81″N 7°45′16.04″W
Galicia	Penitentiary Center of Teixeiro (A Coruña)	43°9′29.9″N 7°59′9.66″W
Balearic Islands	Penitentiary Center of Ibiza	38°54′35.9″N 1°24′15.95″E
Balearic Islands	Penitentiary Center of Mahón (Menorca)	39°52′1.86″N 4°15′29.39″E
Balearic Islands	Penitentiary Center of Palma de Mallorca	39°35′59.29″N 2°39′4.32″E
La Rioja	Penitentiary Center of Logroño	42°26′12.62″N 2°28′16.92″W
Melilla	Penitentiary Center of Melilla	35°18′1.89″N 2°56′36.9″W
Navarre	Penitentiary Center of Pamplona I	42°49′36.85″N 1°40′40.15″W
Basque Country	Penitentiary Center of Áraba/Álava	42°48′3.51″N 2°47′9.93″W
Basque Country	Penitentiary Center of Bilbao	43°14′1.15″N 2°52′28.65″W
Basque Country	Penitentiary Center of San Sebastián	43°18′12.67″N 1°57′26.49″W
Asturias	Penitentiary Center of Villabona	43°28′40.7″N 5°48′44.47″W
Murcia	Penitentiary Center of Murcia	37°55′44.6″N 1°11′15.36″W
Murcia	Penitentiary Center of Murcia II - Campos del Río	37°59′42.12″N 1°23′11.12″W
