= Virginia Clocksin =

American politician

Member of the Washington House of Representatives from the District 24 district
- In office 1967–1969

Personal details
- Born: 1935 Port Townsend, Washington
- Died: February 1, 2007 (aged 71–72) Covington, Louisiana
- Party: Republican

Virginia (Gini) Clocksin (1935 – February 1, 2007) was an American politician. She was a Republican, representing District 24 in the Washington House of Representatives which included parts of Clallam County, Jefferson County and Mason County, from 1967 to 1969.
