= Ultramicrobacteria =

Type of single-cell organisms smaller than 0.1 μm3 under all growth conditions

Ultramicrobacteria are bacteria that are smaller than 0.1 μm^{3} under all conditions. This term was coined in 1981, describing cocci in seawater that were less than 0.3 μm in diameter. Ultramicrobacteria have also been recovered from soil and appear to be a mixture of gram-positive, gram-negative and cell-wall-lacking species. Ultramicrobacteria possess a relatively high surface-area-to-volume ratio due to their small size, which aids in growth under oligotrophic (i.e. nutrient-poor) conditions. The relatively small size of ultramicrobacteria also enables parasitism of larger organisms; some ultramicrobacteria have been observed to be obligate or facultative parasites of various eukaryotes and prokaryotes. One factor allowing ultramicrobacteria to achieve their small size seems to be genome minimization such as in the case of the ultramicrobacterium P. ubique whose small 1.3 Mb genome is seemingly devoid of extraneous genetic elements like non-coding DNA, transposons, extrachromosomal elements etc. However, genomic data from ultramicrobacteria is lacking since the study of ultramicrobacteria, like many other prokaryotes, is hindered by difficulties in cultivating them.

Microbacterial studies from Berkeley Lab at UC Berkeley have produced detailed microscopy images of ultra-small microbial species. Cells imaged have an average volume of 0.009 μm^{3}, meaning that about 150,000 of them could fit on the tip of a human hair. These bacteria were found in groundwater samples and analyzed with 2-D and 3-D cryogenic transmission electron microscopy. These ultra-small bacteria, about 1 million base pairs long, display dense spirals of DNA, few ribosomes, hair-like fibrous appendages, and minimized metabolic systems. Such cells probably gain most essential nutrients and metabolites from other bacteria. Bacteria in the ultra-small size range are thought to be rather common but difficult to detect.

Ultramicrobacteria are commonly confused with ultramicrocells, the latter of which are the dormant, stress-resistant forms of larger cells that form under starvation conditions (i.e. these larger cells downregulate their metabolism, stop growing and stabilize their DNA to create ultramicrocells that remain viable for years) whereas the small size of ultramicrobacteria is not a starvation response and is consistent even under nutrient-rich conditions.

The term "nanobacteria" is sometimes used synonymously with ultramicrobacteria in the scientific literature, but ultramicrobacteria are distinct from the purported nanobacteria or "calcifying nanoparticles", which were proposed to be living organisms that were 0.1 μm in diameter. These structures are now thought to be nonliving, and likely precipitated particles of inorganic material.

== See also ==
- L-form bacteria
- Mycoplasma – smallest known bacteria (300 nm)
- Nanoarchaeum – smallest known archaeum (400 nm)
- Nanobacteria – possible lifeforms smaller than bacteria (<200 nm)
- Nanobe – possible smallest lifeforms (20 nm)
- Megaklothovirus horridgei – largest known virus (3,900 nm)
- Pandoravirus – one of the largest known viruses (1,000 nm)
- Parvovirus – smallest known viruses (18–28 nm)
- Prion – smallest known infectious agent (≈10 nm)
- ND5 and MY14^{T} – two aerobic, gram-negative, rod-shaped bacteria
