= Ginny Montes =

American feminist (1943–1994)

Virginia Montes
- Born: 1943; Guanaja, Honduras
- Died: October 6, 1994 (aged 50–51); Atlanta, Georgia
- Education: University of Florida; Florida State University
- Known for: Civil rights activist and feminist
- Notable work: National Organization for Women
- Spouse: Donald Albury

Virginia Elenor Montes (1943 – October 6, 1994) was a civil rights activist and feminist who was the first Latina to become a national officer of the National Organization for Women.

== Biography ==
Ginny Montes was born in 1943 in Guanaja, Honduras. Her family moved to Tampa, Florida, when she was ten years old. She graduated from Jefferson High School in Tampa, and attended the University of Florida, receiving a B.A. with a major in Sociology in 1968.

Montes became active with the Gainesville Women for Equal Rights (GWER) while still a student. She eventually was elected president of GWER. After graduation, she worked as a social worker for what is now the Florida Department of Children and Families. In 1975, she moved to Tallahassee, Florida, to pursue a master's degree in criminal justice at Florida State University.

Montes moved to Atlanta, Georgia, in 1980 to work for the Southern Regional Council (SRC) as director of legislative research. She also served as director of Project 1990 and director of SRC Voting Rights Programs. Over a 14-year period she assisted SRC in developing legislative analysis on issues relating to civil rights, poverty, children and housing. She also helped black legislators in the southern states as they organized legislative caucuses and was involved in efforts supporting the extension of the federal Voting Rights Act in 1982. During the mid-1980s she served as director of the Georgia Housing Coalition, but later returned to the SRC.

Montes was associated with the National Organization for Women (NOW) for thirteen years. She served two terms as the president of the Georgia state NOW, two terms on the national NOW board of directors, and as government liaison officer and chief lobbyist for the national organization. She led NOW's defense of Lani Guinier when she was nominated by President Clinton to head the Justice Department's civil rights division. In 1991, Montes was elected as national secretary of NOW, serving until 1993. She was the first Latina to hold a national office in the organization. She also served as treasurer of NOW's Political Action Committee until 1993.

Montes also served on the national board of directors of the Center for Community Change, the National Community Reinvestment Coalition, the Advisory Council of Morehouse School of Medicine, and as a delegate to the Democratic National Convention in 1978, '80, '84 and '88. She was named to Who's Who Among Hispanic Americans and Who's Who in American Politics.

Montes died of a stroke in her home in Atlanta on October 6, 1994.

== Personal life ==
Montes was married to Donald Albury from 1966 until 1979, and had one daughter, born in 1971.
