= Virginia Yans-McLaughlin =

American professor of immigrant history

Virginia Yans-McLaughlin (born 1943) is an American anthropologist and historian specializing in immigration. She is professor emerita at Rutgers University.

Yans-McLaughlin received her master's degree and PhD at University at Buffalo. She was a part of the faculty at Rutgers University from 1978 until 2017. She served as a historical advisor to the Ellis Island Museum.

In 1977, she published Family and Community, Italian Immigrants in Buffalo, 1880-1930. In 1991, she published Immigration Reconsidered: History, Sociology, and Politics.

== Personal life ==
Yans-McLaughlin is descended from Italian immigrants, although her parents did not speak Italian at home.
