= Virginia Barcones =

Spanish politician (born 1976)

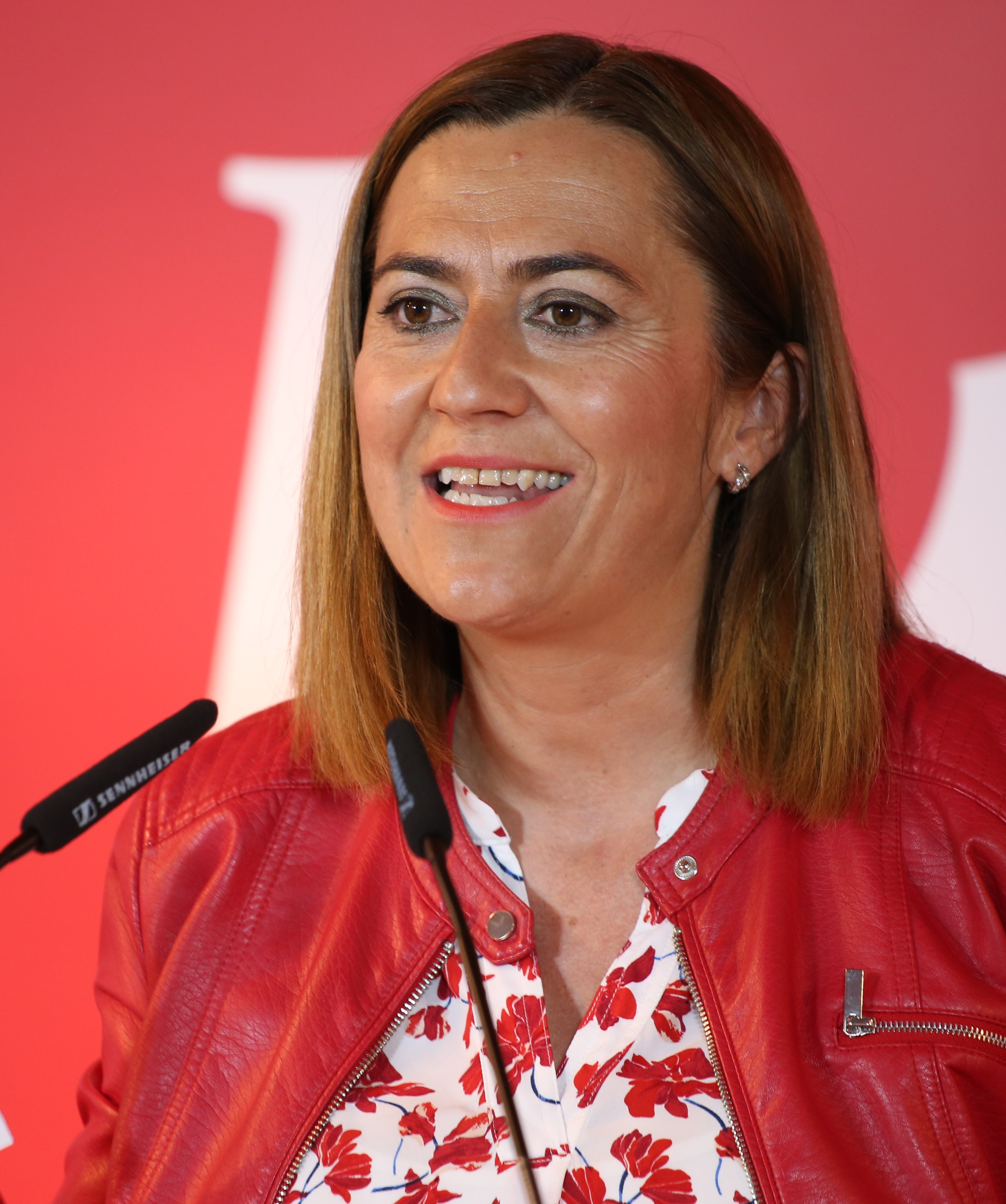
- Barcones in 2019

Secretary-General for Civil Protection and Emergencies
- Incumbent
- Assumed office 28 April 2026
- Prime Minister: Pedro Sánchez
- Preceded by: Office established

Director General for Civil Protection and Emergencies
- In office 13 December 2023 – 28 April 2026
- Prime Minister: Pedro Sánchez
- Preceded by: Francisco Ruíz Boada
- Succeeded by: Benjamín Salvago González

Personal details
- Born: 6 June 1976 (age 49)
- Party: Spanish Socialist Workers' Party

Virginia Barcones Sanz (born 6 June 1976) is a Spanish politician serving as secretary-general for civil protection and emergencies since 2026. From 2023 to 2026, she served as director general for civil protection and emergencies.

Previously, she served as government delegate in Castile and León from 2018 to 2019 and from 2021 to 2023. She was a member of the Cortes of Castile and León from 2015 to 2018 and from 2019 to 2021.
