= Jinny =

Jinny is a feminine given name which may refer to:

- Jinny Beyer (born 1941), American quilt designer and quilter
- Jinny Jacinto (born 1976), Canadian contortionist
- Jinny or Jinny Lee, a stage name of South Korean pop singer Chae Yeon (born 1978)
- Jinny Ng (born 1992), Hong Kong Cantopop singer, hostess and actress
- Jinny Osborn (1927–2003), American pop singer and co-founder of the Chordettes, born Virginia Cole
- Jinny (wrestler) (Jinny Sandhú), English professional wrestler
- Jinny Sims (born 1952), Indian-born Canadian politician
- Jinnytty (born 1992), South Korean livestreamer on Twitch

== See also ==
- Ginny, a list of people named Ginny or Ginnie
- Jinni (disambiguation)
- Jinnie Trail, a conservation area in Staffordshire, England
- Tutbury Jinnie, a local rail service between the stations at Burton-on-Trent and Tutbury, Staffordshire
- Jinni, plural of jinn, a supernatural creature in Arabian and Islamic mythology
