= Virginijus Pikturna =

Lithuanian politician (born 1961)

Virginijus Pikturna (born 23 March 1961) is a Lithuanian politician. In 1990, he was among those who signed the Act of the Re-Establishment of the State of Lithuania.

== See also ==
- Politics of Lithuania
