= Virginia Provisiero =

American comics editor (1923–2010)

Virginia "Ginny" Provisiero (May 29, 1923 – May 3, 2010) was an American comic book editor. She was one of the main editors for Fawcett Publications in the 1940s and 1950s.

== Early life and career ==
Ginny Provisiero was born in Corona, New York on May 29, 1923. She started her career with Fawcett Comics in April 1943. She worked alongside other female editors, such as Jane Magill, Barbara Heyman and Mercedes Shull. She began by re-writing the Spy Smasher stories and assumed responsibility for print production when Heyman departed Fawcett. She succeeded Magill as editor of several strips including, Whiz Comics, Master Comics, Spy Smasher, Golden Arrow, Nyoka the Jungle Girl and Six-Gun Heroes. She also edited Billy Boyd Western, Hopalong Cassidy, Tex Ritter Western, Rocky Lane Western and This Magazine is Haunted. She continued to edit numerous other comic strips until Fawcett ceased publishing comics in 1953.

Provisiero then moved from editing comics to editing magazines such as Women's Day magazine and then True Confessions magazine where she remained an editor for a decade. Toward the end of her editing career, she worked for United Technical Publishing in Garden City, New York.

=== Retirement ===
After 25 years as a New York editor, she moved to Florida in 1968 and became an insurance agent for almost 20 years. She moved from Tallahassee to Crestview in 2004. Along with being an editor, she was also an artist, painter and member of Our Lady of Victory Catholic Church. She died in Crestview on May 3, 2010, at the age of 86.

== Comics editor ==
- Billy Boyd Western
- Golden Arrow
- Hopalong Cassidy (84 issues, 1946–1953)
- Master Comics (133 issues, 1940–1953)
- Nyoka the Jungle Girl (76 issues, 1945–1953)
- Rocky Lane Western (55 issues, 1949–1953)
- Six-Gun Heroes
- Spy Smasher
- Tex Ritter Western
- This Magazine is Haunted (14 issues, 1951–1953)
- Whiz Comics (155 issues, 1940–1953)

=== Magazine editor ===
- Woman's Day
- True Confessions
