= Virginia M. Miller =

American surgeon

- Education: University of Missouri; Slippery Rock University of Pennsylvania
- Scientific career
- Workplaces: Mayo Clinic
- Thesis: Cord-hypothalamic temperature regulation in the marmot (1976)

Virginia M. Miller is an American comparative physiologist who is a professor emerita and former Director of the Women's Health Research Center at the Mayo Clinic. Her research considered how sex hormones such as estrogen impact cardiovascular health.

== Early life and education ==
Miller earned her bachelor's degree in education at Slippery Rock University of Pennsylvania. She earned a Master of Business Administration at the University of Minnesota. She moved to the University of Missouri for graduate studies, where she specialized in physiology.

== Research and career ==
Miller dedicated her career to better understanding women's health. Miller studied sex hormones and their role in cardiovascular health. She served as Principal Investigator of the Mayo Clinic Building Interdisciplinary Careers in Women’s Health scholar's program.

== Awards and honors ==
- Bernadine Healy Award for Visionary Leadership in Women’s Health
- Women’s Day Magazine Red Dress Award
- Paul M. Vanhoutte Named Lecture in Vascular Pharmacology from the American Society for Pharmacology and Experimental Therapeutics
- Governing council for the American Physiological Society
- President of the Organization for the Study of Sex Differences

== Selected publications ==
- Vanhoutte PM; Rubanyi GM; Miller VM; Houston DS (1 January 1986). "Modulation of vascular smooth muscle contraction by the endothelium". Annual Review of Physiology. 48: 307–320. doi:10.1146/annurev.ph.48.030186.001515. ISSN 0066-4278. PMID 2871807. Wikidata Q39441004.
- Virginia M Miller; Sue P Duckles (25 June 2008). "Vascular actions of estrogens: functional implications". Pharmacological Reviews. 60 (2): 210–241. doi:10.1124/pr.107.08002. ISSN 0031-6997. PMC 2637768. PMID 18579753. Wikidata Q37088243.
