= Geneva (given name) =

- Gender: Female
- Language: Germanic

Origin
- Meaning: Juniper tree

Geneva is a Germanic feminine given name which means "juniper tree". Notable people with the name include:

- Geneva Carr (born 1971), American actress
- Geneva Cruz (born 1976), Filipina singer
- Geneva Mercer (1889–1984), American artist
- Geneva Mitchell (1907–1949), American actress
- Geneva Overholser (born 1948), American journalist
