= Jenn =

Jenn is a feminine given name, frequently a shortened form (hypocorism) of Jennifer. It may refer to:

== Authors ==
- Jenn Alandy Trahan, an American short story writer
- Jenn Ashworth (born 1982), an English writer
- Jenn Bennett (born 1978), an American author
- Jenn Shapland, an American writer and archivist

== Music ==
- Jenn Bostic (born 1986), an American country singer-songwriter
- Jenn Butterworth (born 1983), a Scotland-based acoustic folk guitarist and singer
- Jenn Champion, an American singer-songwriter and guitarist
- Jenn Colella, an American actress and singer
- Jenn Cuneta, a Filipino American singer
- Jenn Forbes, an Australian-born singer-songwriter
- Jenn Grant (born 1980), a Canadian folk pop singer-songwriter
- Jenn Grinels, an American musician, singer and songwriter, and actress
- Jenn Johnson, an American Christian worship singer, songwriter and worship pastor
- Jenn Korbee, an American singer, songwriter, and actress
- Jenn Mierau, a Canadian electropop musician
- Jenn Morel (born 1990), a Dominican-American rapper, singer and songwriter
- Jenn Vix, an American solo electronic-rock singer, songwriter, producer, and recording engineer
- Jenn Wasner (born 1986), an American musician from Baltimore

== Television ==
- Jenn Brown (born 1981), an American sports broadcaster and television host
- Jenn Engels, a Canadian television writer and producer
- Jenn Gotzon, an American film actress
- Jenn Forgie (born 1969), a Canadian actress and singer
- Jenn Lyon, an American actress
- Jenn McAllister (born 1996), an American internet personality, actress and comedian
- Jenn Shaw (born 1983), an American film director and producer
- Jenn Proske (born 1987), a Canadian American actress
- Jenn Murray (born 1986), a Northern Irish actress
- Jenn Sterger (born 1983), an American model, television personality, and former online columnist
- Jenn Tran (born 1997), a Vietnamese American television personality

== Politics ==
- Jenn Daniels, an American politician
- Jenn Hill (born 1966), an American politician
- Jenn McGinn, a Canadian politician
- Jenn Ladisch Douglass, an American politician and Illinois house representative
- Jenn Redmond, a Canadian politician
- Jenn Roberts, an Australian politician

== Sports ==
- Jenn Hanna (born 1980), a Canadian curler
- Jenn Hildreth, an American sports commentator
- Jenn Mitchell (born 1988), a Canadian curler
- Jenn Shelton (born 1983), an American ultramarathoner
- Jenn Smith, a Canadian curler
- Jenn Morris (born 1972), a former field hockey defender
- Jenn Suhr (born 1982), an American former pole vaulter
- Jenn Wakefield (born 1989), a Canadian ice hockey player and coach

== Others ==
- Jenn Donahue, an American businesswoman
- Jenn Im (born 1990), an American fashion beauty vlogger and fashion designer
- Jenn Lindsay (born 1978), an American social scientist
- Jenn Mann, an American licensed marriage and family therapist
- Jenn Nkiru, a Nigerian-British artist and director
- Jenn Sherman (born 1969), an American fitness instructor
- Jenn White (born 1974), an American journalist and radio personality

== See also ==
- Jen
- Jennifer
- Jenna
- Jenny
