= Jenny (given name) =

- Pronunciation: /ˈdʒɛni/
- Gender: Female

Origin
- Meaning: "God is gracious" (Jane) or "Fair one" (Jennifer)

Other names
- Related names: Jenni, Jane, Jennifer, Jen, Jenna

Jenny is a female given name. The name was originally the diminutive form of Jane, which means "God is gracious", but it is now associated with Jennifer, which means "the fair one". It may also be spelt Jennie, which was the most common spelling before the 20th century.

== People with the given name ==
- Jenny Agutter (born 1952), English actress
- Jenny-Wanda Barkmann (1922–1946), German concentration camp guard
- Jenny Beavan (born 1950), English costume designer
- Jenny Berggren (born 1972), Swedish singer
- Jennie Bergius Eriksson (born 1981), Swedish politician
- Jenny Berrigan (born 1983), American snowboarder
- Jenny Berthelius (1923–2019), Swedish crime novelist and children's writer
- Jennie Bimson (born 1976), English field hockey player
- Jennie M. Bingham (1859–1933), American author and littérateur
- Jenny Blanco (born 1985), Dominican model
- Jenny Body, British aerospace engineer
- Jennie Bond (born 1950), English journalist
- Jenny Boucek (born 1973), American basketball coach and player
- Jenny Bruso, American hiker, influencer, and activist
- Jenny Buckley (born 1979), Irish actress and television presenter
- Jenny Campbell (artist) (1895–1970), Scottish artist
- Jennie Carignan (born 1968), Canadian lieutenant-general
- Jennie Casseday (1840–1893), American philanthropist
- Jennie Churchill (1854–1921), American-born British socialite
- Jennie Thornley Clarke (1860–1924), American educator, writer, and anthologist
- Jennie Collins (1828–1887), American labor reformer, humanitarian, and suffragist
- Jennie Maria Drinkwater Conklin (1841–1900), American author and social activist
- Jenny Craig (entrepreneur) (born 1932), American businesswoman
- Jenny Crain (born 1968), American long-distance runner
- Jenny Curtsdotter (born 1976), Swedish footballer
- Jenny Danielsson (born 1994), Finnish footballer
- Jenny Diver (c. 1700–1741), Irish pickpocket
- Jenny af Forselles (1869–1938), Finnish teacher and politician
- Jenny Frost (born 1978), English singer and television presenter
- Jenny Gal (born 1969), Dutch-Italian judoka
- Jennie Garth (born 1972), American actress
- Jenny Gusyk (1897–1944), Turkish woman, first female foreign student at the University of Cologne
- Jenny Han (born 1980), Korean-American writer
- Jennie Hanna (1856–1924), American missionary worker and religious auxiliary founder
- Jenny Hiloudaki (born 1968), Greek DJ, book author and former brothel madam
- Jenny Hjohlman (born 1990), Swedish footballer
- Jennie Florella Holmes (1842–1892), American suffragist and temperance activist
- Jenny Hval (born 1980), Norwegian singer-songwriter, record producer, and novelist
- Jenny Johansson (born 1977), Swedish orienteering competitor
- Jennie Joseph, midwife and activist
- Jenny Karezi (1932–1992), Greek film and stage actress
- Jennie Murray Kemp (1858–1928), American temperance activist
- Jenny Kenney (1884–1961), British suffragette and Montessori teacher
- Jenny Kim (born 1994), South Korean model and beauty pageant titleholder
- Jennie (singer) (born 1996), South Korean singer, member of girl group Blackpink
- Jenny Lau (born 1985), British writer and community organiser
- Jenny Lewis (born 1976), American singer-songwriter, musician, and actress
- Jenny Lind (1820–1887), Swedish opera singer
- Jennifer Lopez (born 1969), American singer, dancer and actress
- Jennie Lozier (1841–1915), American physician
- Jenny Marcroft (born 1963), New Zealand politician
- Jenny Markelin-Svensson (1882–1929), Finnish professional inspector and engineer
- Jenny Mastoraki (born 1949), Greek poet and translator
- Jenny McCarthy (born 1972), American actress, model, and television personality
- Jenny McCudden, Irish journalist, newspaper editor, author and television producer
- Jenny B. Merrill (1854–1934), American early childhood educator and author
- Jenny Nicholson, American video essayist
- Jenny Nimmo (born 1944), British fantasy author
- Jenny Nyström (1854–1946), Swedish painter and illustrator
- Jenny Nyström (badminton) (born 1994), Finnish badminton player
- Jenny Ohlsson (born 1975), Swedish diplomat
- Jenny Pandos (disappeared 1987), American missing person
- Jenny Pat (1981–2014), Hong Kong-born, Chinese-Canadian international artist and television personality
- Jenny Pavley (born 1976), American beach volleyball player
- Jenny Pike (1922–2004), Canadian photographer and servicewoman
- Jenny Lind Porter (1927–2020), American poet and teacher
- Jennie O'Neill Potter (1867–1900), American actor and dramatic reader
- Jenny Powell (born 1968), English television and radio presenter
- Jenny Ramp (born 2003), Filipino-American model and beauty pageant titleholder
- Jenny Rautionaho (born 1996), Finnish ski jumper
- Jenny Shepherd (born 1972), New Zealand field hockey player
- Jennie Hart Sibley (1846–1917), American temperance leader
- Jenny Sjödin (born 1985), Swedish professional wrestler and submission grappler
- Jenny Slate (born 1982), American actress, stand-up comedian, and writer
- Jennie Somogyi (born c. 1977), American ballet dancer
- Jennie O. Starkey (c. 1856–1918), American journalist and newspaper editor
- Jenny Tan (born 1981), Indonesian television presenter
- Jennie Lasby Tessmann (1882–1959), American spectroscopist and college educator
- Jenny Tonge, Baroness Tonge (born 1941), British politician
- Jenny Upari (1882–1948), Finnish politician
- Jenny Vanou (1939–2014), Greek singer
- Jenny Walser (born 1995), English actress
- Jennie Wernäng (born 1985), Swedish politician
- Jenny von Westphalen (1814–1881), German theatre critic and political activist
- Jenny Whittle (born 1973), Australian basketball player
- Jenny Wolf (born 1979), German speed skater
- Jenny Yokobori (born 1997), American voice actress

== Fictional characters ==
- Jenny, a character in the cartoon My Pet Monster
- Jenny, a character in the 1984 American musical comedy movie The Muppets Take Manhattan
- Jenny, a character in the 2001 American independent comedy-drama movie Little Secrets
- Jenny, in the 2008 Doctor Who episode "The Doctor's Daughter"
- Jenny, a character from the hybrid live-action/animated series Wild Kratts
- Jenny Flint, part of a trio who occasionally helps the Doctor in Doctor Who
- Jenny, a character in the 2022 American-Canadian holiday film Christmas in Rockwell
- Jenny in the Wayside School books and cartoon
- Jenny, the main female character in Larry Clark's 1995 film Kids
- Jenny Ballinger, a character in the TV sitcom The Ropers
- Jenny Bradley, a character in the British soap opera Coronation Street
- Jenny Cavalleri, female protagonist in Love Story
- Jenny Curran, a character in the 1994 film Forrest Gump
- Jenny Everywhere, open-source comic character
- Jenny Foxworth, a child character in the 1988 Disney film Oliver & Company
- Jenny Grogan, in Marley & Me, played by Jennifer Aniston
- Jenny Hayden, a character in the 1984 American science fiction romance movie Starman
- Jenny Helmandollar, a character from Louds
- Jenny Humphrey, a character in Gossip Girl and It Girl
- Jenny, a character in the 2005 South Korean romance film Jenny, Juno
- Jenny Jenkins, a character from the comic strip and novel Big Nate.
- Jenny Kelly, a character in the 1996 series Sabrina the Teenage Witch (1996 TV series)
- Jenny Lerner, a character in the 1998 American science-fiction disaster movie Deep Impact
- Jennie Lowell, a character in the American sitcom Kate & Allie
- Jenny McBride, a mouse from The Secret of NIMH 2: Timmy to the Rescue
- Jenny Pizza, a character in the animated series Steven Universe
- Jenny Reilly, a character in the series The Black Donnellys
- Jenny Romano, a character from The Darkness
- Jenny Schecter, a main character from The L Word
- Jenny Scott in the 1991 thriller Shattered
- Jenny Shepard in the television series NCIS
- Jennie "Jeni" Sicat, a character from the 2026 Philippine musical drama Born to Shine
- Jenny Skoutari, the protagonist in the film Jenny Jenny
- Jenny Sparks and Jenny Quantum in The Authority comic books
- Jenny Szalinski in the 1997 American film Honey, We Shrunk Ourselves
- Jenny Wakeman in the Nickelodeon cartoon My Life as a Teenage Robot
- Jenny Wilcox, a character in the 1991 American science fiction action comedy movie Suburban Commando
- Jenny Wolek in the soap opera One Life to Live
- Jenny The Witch in the film Big Fish (2003) and the novel Big Fish: A Novel of Mythic Proportions (1998)
- Jenny Woodentop, a character from the 1950s children TV series The Woodentops
- First Mate Jenny, character in the 1980s comic series Bucky O'Hare
- Low-Dive Jenny/Ginny Jenny, in The Threepenny Opera
- Officer Jenny, the name of the many police officers in Pokémon
- Jenny, the Tagalog dub name for Keiko (Kayko) Yukimura (see list of YuYu Hakusho characters), a character in YuYu Hakusho (known in the Philippines as Ghost Fighter)
