= Sibley (surname) =

Sibley or Sibly is an English surname. Notable people with the surname include:

- Andrew Sibley (1933–2015), Australian artist
- Alexander H. Sibley (1817–1878), Canadian businessman
- Antoinette Sibley (born 1939), English ballerina
- Brian Sibley (born 1949), British writer and broadcaster
- Carol Sibley (1902–1986), American civic leader and alumni leader
- Celestine Sibley (1914–1999), American author
- Charles Sibley (1917–1998), American ornithologist and molecular biologist
- Cyril William Sibley (1923–1945), British airman (RAF), murdered by a German Nazi
- David Allen Sibley (born 1961), American ornithologist and author
- David Sibley (politician) (born 1948), Texas politician and lobbyist
- Dominic Sibley, (born 1993), English cricketer
- Ebenezer Sibly, (1751– c. 1799), English physician, astrologer and writer on the occult
- Frank Sibley (philosopher) (1923–1996), British analytic philosopher and aesthetician
- Frank Tremar Sibly Menendez (1896–1973), British-Bahaman soldier
- George Champlin Sibley, American explorer, soldier, Indian agent
- Harry Sibley (c. 1867–1917), South Australian architect in practice with Daniel Garlick
- Henry Hastings Sibley (1811–1891), first Governor of Minnesota
- Henry Hopkins Sibley (1816–1886), Confederate general
- Hiram Sibley (1807–1888), American entrepreneur
- Irena Sibley (1944–2009), Australian artist, children's book author and illustrator
- Jane E. Sibley (1838–1930), American temperance leader
- Jennie Hart Sibley (1846–1917), American temperance leader
- John Churchill Sibley (1858–1938), director of the Queen's Music
- John Langdon Sibley (1804–1885) librarian and historian Harvard University
- Louie Sibley (born 2001), English football player
- Mark Sibley (born 1950), American basketball player
- Montgomery Blair Sibley (born 1956), former American lawyer
- Mulford Q. Sibley (1912–1989), American political scientist
- Robert Sibley (1881–1958), American engineer, founder of park system in California, and alumni leader
- Rufus Sibley (1841–1928), American businessman, founder of Sibley, Lindsay & Curr Company department stores
- Solomon Sibley (1769–1846), Delegate to Congress and Supreme Court Justice for Michigan Territory
- W. A. Sibly (1882–1959), English headmaster, activist, and writer
- William Crapon Sibley (1832–1902), American business executive
