= Sibley =

Sibley may refer to:

- Sibley (surname)
- Sibley (automobile)

== Places and landmarks ==
In Canada:

- Sibley Peninsula, Ontario (on Lake Superior)

In the United States:

- Sibley, Illinois
- Sibley, Iowa
- Sibley, Kansas
- Sibley, Louisiana
- Sibley, Mississippi
- Sibley, Missouri
- Sibley, North Dakota
- Sibley County, Minnesota
- Sibley Memorial Hospital, in Washington, D.C.
- Robert Sibley Volcanic Regional Preserve, in California
- Sibley Park

== Other ==
- Sibley–Ahlquist taxonomy of birds, a phenetic DNA-based taxonomy of birds
- Sibley's, a former New York state department store chain
- Sibley's Shoes, a former Michigan retail footwear chain
- Sibley fire, a 1904 New York disaster
