= Jena (given name) =

- Gender: Female

Origin
- Origin: Arabic
- Meaning: Small bird

Jena is a female given name with multiple independent origins.

It is a variant form of names such as Jenna, Gina, Jeanna and has been associated with the Arabic name Jannah (جنة, 'paradise').

Jena is also considered an anglicized spelling of Jéňa which is a hypocoristic form of Jenovéfa, the czech form of Geneviève.

== Famous people ==
- Jena Friedman (born 1983), American comedian
- Jena Irene, American singer
- Jena Lee (born Sylvia Garcia, 1987, in Chile), French singer
- Jena Malone (born 1984), American actress
- Jena Osman, American poet and editor
- Jena Sims (born 1988), American beauty queen

== Fictional characters ==
- Jena Makharov in comic series Nikolai Dante
- Jena Pyre, host of the Phoenix Force in Marvel Comics

== See also ==
- Jena (disambiguation)
- Jenna
- Jenny (given name)
- Jen
