= Yena =

Yena may refer to:

- Choi Ye-na, or Yena, South Korean singer and actress
- Yena, member of the South Korean girl group April
- Chang Ye-na, South Korean badminton player
- Khaka Yena, South African music producer and DJ

== See also ==
- Iena (disambiguation)
- Jena (disambiguation)
- Yeina Island
