= Jena (disambiguation) =

Jena is a German city, the second largest city in Thuringia, Germany.

Jena may also refer to:

== Places ==
- Jena, Alabama, an unincorporated community
- Jena, Florida, an unincorporated community
- Jena, Louisiana, a town in the United States; named for the German town
- Jena (Oxford, Maryland), a home on the U.S. National Register of Historic Places
- Jena, Bokaro, a town in Jharkhand, India
- Jena, a village in Gavojdia Commune, Timiș County, Romania

== People ==
- Jena (given name), a list of people with this name
- Jena (surname), a list of people so named
- Jena Band of Choctaw Indians

== Other ==
- Battle of Jena, within Napoleonic battle of Jena–Auerstedt
- Jena Romanticism, the first phase of Romanticism in German literature
- Jena Symphony, a musical composition once attributed to Beethoven
- University of Jena, Germany
- Jenaplan schools
- Jena Observatory, Germany
- 526 Jena, an asteroid
- Jena (framework), a Semantic Web framework

== See also ==
- Jenna
- Iena (disambiguation)
