= Stand Up for Science 2025 =

Pro-science marches in 2025

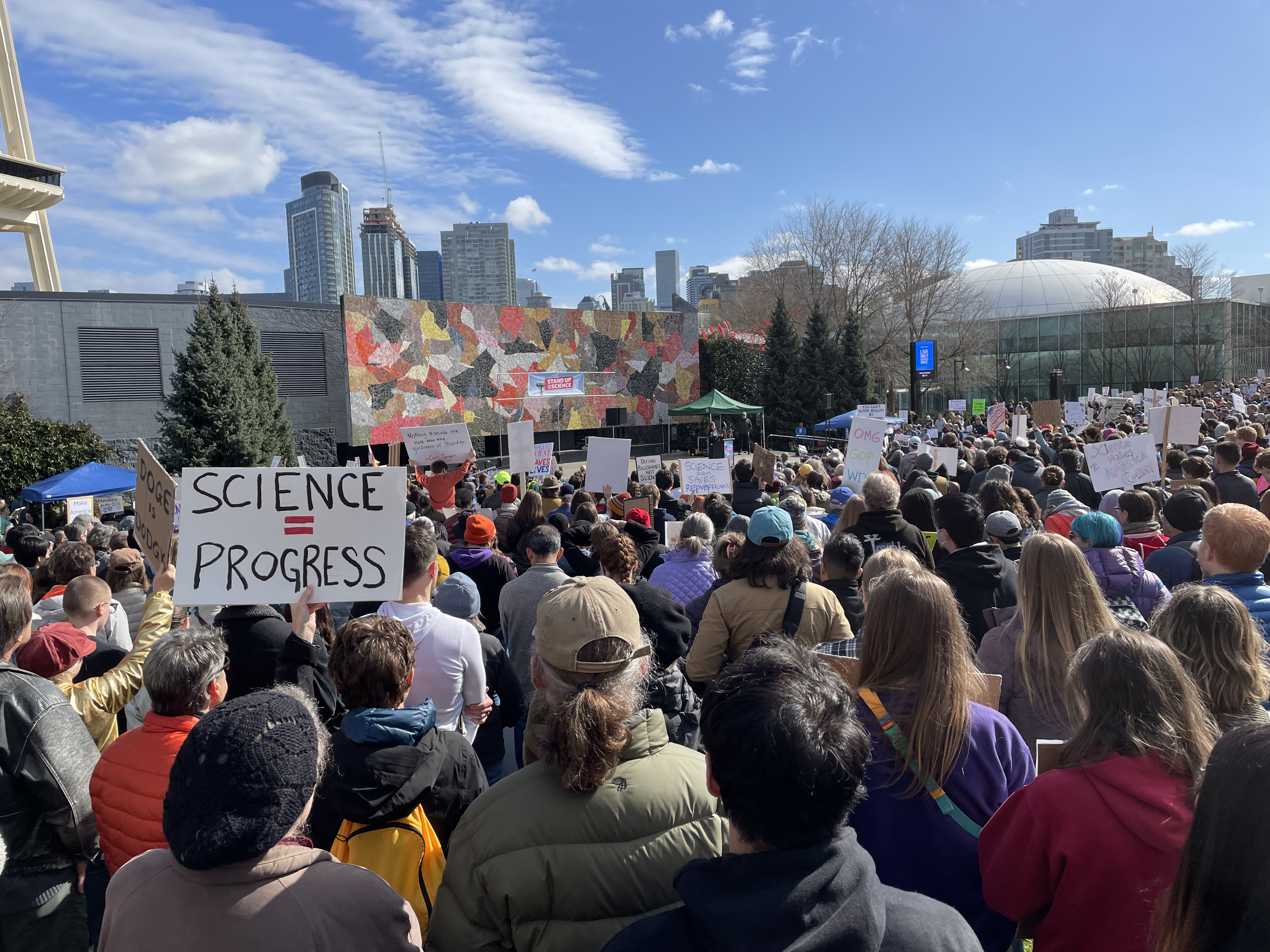
A crowd of people at the Stand Up For Science protest in Seattle on March 7, 2025

Stand Up for Science are a series of protests that first occurred on March 7, 2025, and then again March 7, 2026. It is now also a 501(c)(4) non-profit organization formed in February 2025 as an endeavor to combat policy changes administered in Donald Trump's second term as president. The Stand Up for Science non-profit organized the Bethesda Declaration, the EPA Letter of Dissent and the NASA Voyager Declaration.

== Background ==
Stand Up for Science was founded by JP Flores, Emma Courtney, Sam Goldstein, Leslie Bernsten, and Colette Delawalla in February 2025. Amid the first 47 days of Donald Trump's second term, concerns emerged within scientific and medical communities regarding certain policy changes.

The policy changes of concern included: the termination of grants related to transgender research and diversity initiatives at the National Institutes of Health, the review of thousands of National Science Foundation grants containing keywords such as "women" and "diversity", the dismissal of hundreds of probationary employees at the National Oceanic and Atmospheric Administration and the National Weather Service, a proposed indirect cost cap at the National Institute of Health, attempted closure of facilities housing the Alaska and Hawaii Volcano Observatories, as well as concerns about the withdrawal of the United States from several climate initiatives.

These changes immediately began to affect researchers and their ongoing work, as many were forced to prematurely end their studies. In the wake of mass cancellations of grants and studies, the co-organizers determined that an organized response was needed in order to combat the aforementioned policy changes.

Lead organizers utilized their vast networks to gather early-career scientists and graduate students that collectively expressed frustration at the lack of organized response to recent policies affecting scientific research. In the early stages, lead organizing members drafted several key objectives beyond broadly opposing the Trump administration's specific policy decisions. These objectives included: the opposition of freezes on scientific grants and the dismissal of government scientists, the advocating for expanded funding for scientific research, calling for the reinstatement of diversity, equity, inclusion, accessibility initiatives within government-funded science, and ultimately, demanding an end to political interference in scientific processes.

== Declarations ==
On June 9th, 2025, federal employees at the National Institutes of Health (NIH) stood up for the health and safety of the American people and faithful stewardship of public resources by authoring and signing the Bethesda Declaration.

Stand up for Science partnered with the Environmental Protection Agency in order to draft and host the EPA's Declaration of Dissent. Published on June 30th, 2025, the letter publicly accuses Administrator Lee Zeldin’s administration of recklessly undermining the EPA mission in at least the following five ways: exchanging ethics for political favor, ignoring scientific consensus to benefit corporate polluters, reversing EPA's progress in America's most vulnerable communities and dismantling the Office of Research and Development.

On Monday, July 21st, 2025, on the 56th anniversary of the moon landing, NASA employees exercised their expression of Formal Dissent by authoring, signing, and submitting the Voyager Declaration to Interim Administrator Sean Duffy and members of Congress who oversee the management of NASA.

== Demonstrations ==
Stand Up for Science managed to garner over 100 volunteers to help organize and facilitate demonstrations against the devastating cuts to federal research funding and infrastructure.

=== Washington D.C. ===
The Washington, D.C. demonstration held on March 7, 2025, at the Lincoln Memorial featured numerous high-profile speakers including former Director of the National Institutes of Health and human genome researcher Francis Collins, astronomer Phil Plait, Nobel Prize–winning biologist Victor Ambros, former NASA administrator Bill Nelson, and scientific television personality Bill Nye. Cancer survivor Emily Whitehead shared her experience as the first recipient of CAR T-cell therapy that saved her life when she was five years old. Several speakers addressed the attacks on institutions such as the Environmental Protection Agency and National Oceanic and Atmospheric Administration, including Congressman Bill Foster, Dr. Gretchen Goldman from the Union of Concerned Scientists, and volcanic researcher Denali Kincaid who highlighted the threat against multiple of the nations volcano observatories and other natural disaster related programs.

=== Satellite ===
Outside of Washington, D.C., significant protests occurred in other cities with strong scientific communities. According to organizers, parallel demonstrations occurred in more than 30 additional U.S. cities and international solidarity events were reported in several other countries that included more than 30 locations in France. Scientists unable to attend these events were encouraged by organizers to walkout of their workplaces. Philadelphia hosted a demonstration centered around City Hall, consisting of members of the medical institutions and healthcare education systems in the city. University of Pennsylvania infectious disease specialist Dr. Cedric Bien-Gund articulated his concern about effects on transgender and nonbinary patients. Similarly, thousands of protesters gathered at The Seattle Mural at Seattle Center in Seattle, where Washington State Governor Bob Ferguson confirmed his support for science. Further protests were held at the Michigan State Capitol, Hamilton College in Kirkland, New York, the Boston Common, the Tennessee State Capitol, and Schenley Plaza in Pittsburgh, Pennsylvania.

Many protestors carried signs with scientific themes and criticisms of specific public figures including President Donald Trump, Secretary of Health and Human Services Robert F. Kennedy Jr., and Elon Musk, which included slogans such as "science is the vaccine for ignorance", "Edit Elon out of USA's DNA", and "In evidence we trust".

Across France, scientific communities hosted more than 30 related events mobilized under the name "Stand up for Science France" in solidarity with their American counterparts. Many French scientists who were part of the demonstrations expressed concerns at the changes in United States policy that would restrict international scientific communication, data sharing, budgets, and climate change-related findings. The French initiative included numerous demonstrations and academic conferences throughout France.

== See also ==
- Environmental policy of the second Donald Trump administration
- March for Science
- Protests against the second presidency of Donald Trump
