= Jenna =

- Gender: Female

Origin
- Language: English

Other names
- Related names: Genevieve; Jane; Janet; Jen; Jennifer; Jenny

Jenna is a female given name. In the English-speaking world it is a variation of Jenny, which is itself a diminutive of Jane, Janet, Jennifer and is often used as a name in its own right.

== Notable people ==
- Jenna Andrews (born 1985 or 1986), Canadian singer, songwriter, and record producer
- Jenna Arnold (born 1981), American activist and businesswoman
- Jenna Bass (born 1986), South African film director
- Jenna Boyd (born 1993), American actress
- Jenna Buglioni (born 2002), Canadian ice hockey player
- Jenna Busch (born 1973), American entertainment journalist
- Jenna Bush (born 1981), daughter of George W. Bush
- Jenna-Anne Buys (born 1985), South African figure skater
- Jenna Clark (born 2001), Scottish footballer
- Jenna Coleman (born 1986), English actress
- Jenna Davis (born 2004), American actress and singer
- Jenna Dewan (born 1980), American actress and dancer
- Jenna de Rosnay (born 1963), American windsurfer, fashion designer, and model
- Jenna Elfman (born 1971), American actress and producer
- Jenna Ellis (born 1984), American lawyer
- Jenna Ezarik (born 1989), American YouTuber and Twitch Streamer
- Jenna Fife (born 1995), Scottish footballer
- Jenna Fischer (born 1974), American actress
- Jenna Gribbon (born 1978), American painter
- Jenna Hall (born 1984), American softball coach
- Jenna Haze (born 1982), American pornographic actress
- Jenna Jambeck (born 1974), American environmental engineer and academic
- Jenna Jameson (born 1974), American pornographic actress
- Jenna Johnson (swimmer) (born 1967), American swimmer
- Jenna Johnson (born 1994), American professional dancer
- Jenna Kim Jones (born 1986), American comedian and podcaster
- Jenna Lamia, American actress, writer, and audiobook narrator
- Jenna Lee (born 1980), American journalist
- Jenna Legg (born 1997), English association football player
- Jenna Leigh Green (born 1974), American actress and singer
- Jenna Lester (born 1989), American dermatologist
- Jenna Lyons (born 1968), American fashion designer and business personality
- Jenna Marbles (born 1986), American entertainer
- Jenna McCorkell (born 1986), British figure skater
- Jenna McCormick (born 1994), Australian rules footballer
- Jenna McDougall (born 1992), Australian singer
- Jenna Meek, British entrepreneur
- Jenna Morasca (born 1981), American actress, glamour model and reality television personality
- Jenna Nighswonger (born 2000), American soccer player
- Jenna Norton, American public health scientist
- Jenna O'Hea (born 1987), Australian basketball player
- Jenna Ortega (born 2002), American actress and model
- Jenna Presley (born 1987), American minister and former pornographic actress
- Jenna Raunio (born 2006), Swedish ice hockey player
- Jenna Rose (born 1998), American singer
- Jenna Russell (born 1967), English actress
- Jenna Santoromito (born 1987), Australian water polo player
- Jenna Schillaci (born 1984), English association football player
- Jenna Smith (born 1988), American basketball player
- Jenna Sudds (born 1979), Canadian politician
- Jenna Talackova (born 1988), Canadian transgender model
- Jenna Ushkowitz (born 1986), Korean-American actress and singer
- Jenna von Oÿ (born 1977), American actress and singer
- Jenna Walker (born 1999), American soccer player
- Jenna Welch (1919–2019), mother of Laura Bush and grandmother of Jenna Bush
- Jenna Wolfe (born 1974), Jamaican-American reporter

== Fictional characters ==
- Jenna in the animated Balto film series
- Jenna in the video game series Golden Sun
- Jenna, the leading character of the Magyk novel series by Angie Sage
- Jenna Ashby, one of three main female characters, in the novel Wither (2012)
- Jenna Avid in the spin-off series Baywatch: Hawaii
- Jenna Hamilton, central character in Awkward, a teen television series
- Jenna Heap in the Septimus Heap book series
- Jenna Maroney in the television series 30 Rock
- Jenna Marshall in the television series Pretty Little Liars
- Jenna Middleton in the television series Degrassi: The Next Generation
- Jenna Morgan in the television series Arthur
- Jenna Rink in the movie 13 Going on 30 (2004) played by Jennifer Garner
- Jenna Sommers in the television series The Vampire Diaries
- Jenna Stannis in the British science fiction television series Blake's 7
- Jenna Wade in Dallas
- Jenna Whitehall in the movie We'll Meet Again (2012)

== Music ==
- Jenna, 1989 album by Gerald Wilson

== See also ==
- Janna (disambiguation)
- Jena (framework), open-source software project
- Jena (given name)
