= Scott Bateman =

American cartoonist

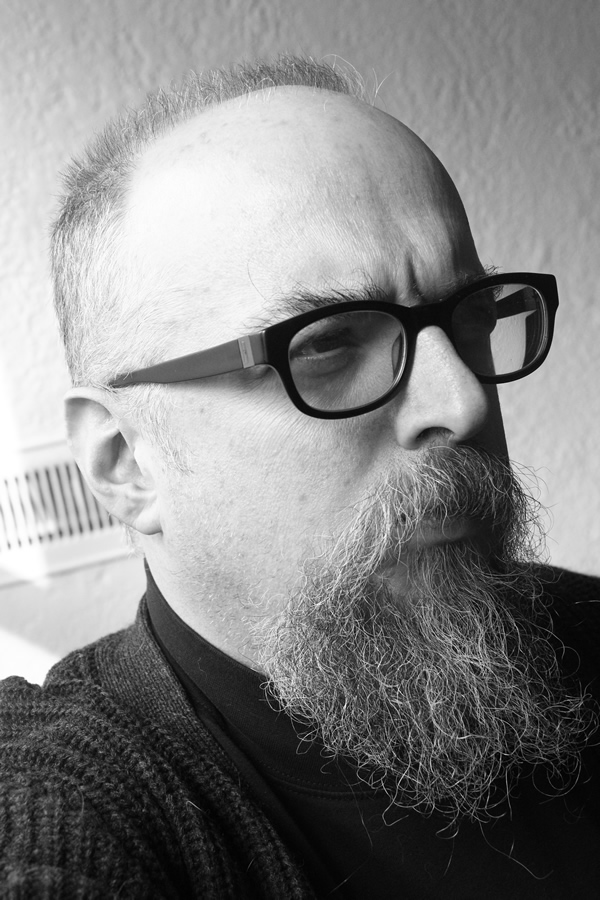
Scott Bateman

Scott Bateman (born January 30, 1964) is an American filmmaker, author, animator, and cartoonist.

He graduated from the University of Puget Sound in 1986.

== Filmography ==
- Scott Bateman Presents Scott Bateman Presents (TV series, Plum TV, 2007).
- Atom Age Vampire (Feature film, 2009).
- You, Your Brain, & You (Feature film, 2015).
- 600 Space Aliens (Short film, 2016).
- The Bateman Lectures on Depression (Feature film, 2018).
- 5000 Space Aliens (Feature film, 2021).
- Can We Know Anything About Carrots? (Short film, 2023).

== Books ==
- Scott Bateman's Sketchbook of Secrets & Shame: Includes 14 Essays from Shamefully Famous Folks (Word Riot Press, 2006).
- Disalmanac: A Book of Fact-Like Facts (TarcherPerigee, 2013).

== Music videos ==
- Low: Hatchet (Optimimi Version)
- Clinic: Jigsaw Man
- Thao & The Get Down Stay Down: Cool Yourself
- Boston Spaceships: Fly Away (Terry Says)
- Jenn Vix: Vampires
- Cult of KFYMA: I Don't Have Time To Explain Molecules To You

== Web animations ==
- Bateman 365
