= JCMS =

JCMS may refer to:

- Jonas Clarke Middle School, a public school in Lexington, Massachusetts, United States
- Journal of Cinema and Media Studies
- Journal of Common Market Studies
- Journal of Cutaneous Medicine and Surgery
