= Shibley =

Shibley is a surname. Notable people with the surname include:

- Arkie Shibley (1914–1975), American country singer
- Carla Shibley (born 1990), Canadian para-cyclist
- Gail Shibley (born c. 1958), American politician
- Schuyler Shibley (1820–1890), Canadian businessman and politician
- William Shibley (1876–1926), American football coach

== See also ==
- Sibley (surname)
