= Jane E. Sibley =

American temperance leader (1838–1930)

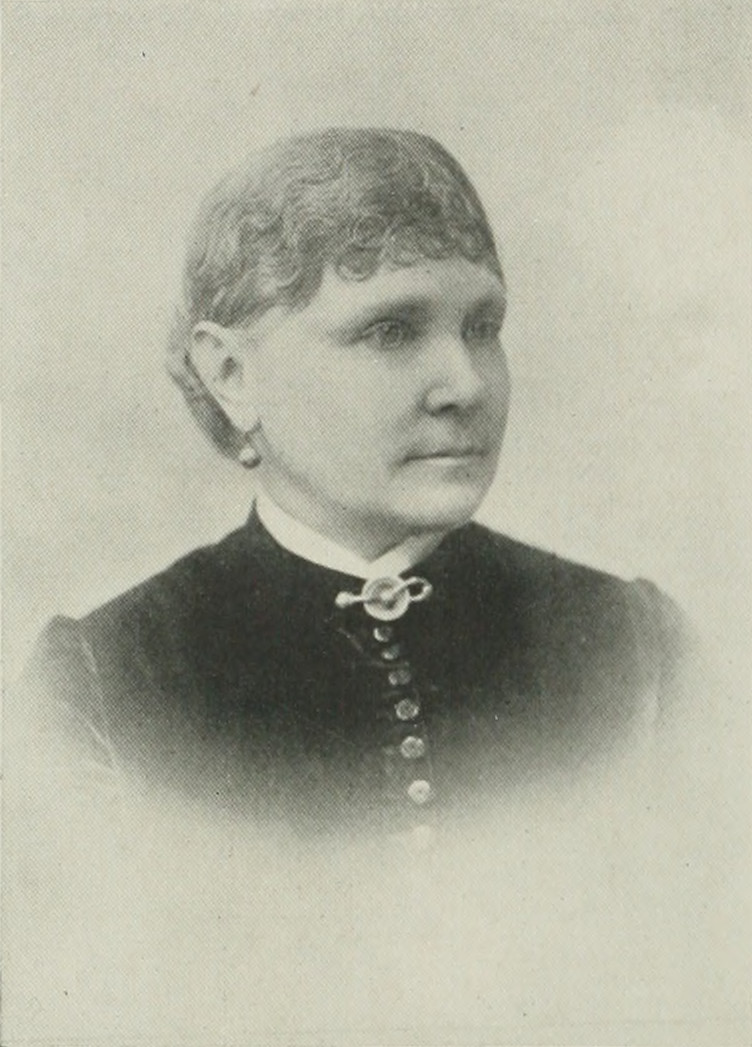
- Portrait from A Woman of the Century
- Born: Jane Elizabeth Thomas; February 13, 1838; Columbus, Georgia, U.S.
- Died: April 22, 1930 (aged 92); Augusta, Georgia, U.S.
- Other name: Jennie
- Occupation: Temperance leader
- Known for: President, Georgia Woman's Christian Temperance Union
- Spouse: William Crapon Sibley (m. 1860; died 1902)

Jane E. Sibley (née Thomas; after marriage, Mrs. W. C. Sibley; 1838–1930) was an American leader in the temperance movement. She was the first president of the Georgia State Woman's Christian Temperance Union (WCTU). Writing and lecturing on temperance, and providing it with her financial support gave her reputation prominence throughout the South.

== Early life ==
Jane (nickname "Jennie") Elizabeth (or Eliza) Thomas was born in Columbus, Georgia, February 13, 1838. Reared in wealth, Jane's girlhood home was an estate near Columbus. Her father was Judge Grigsby Eskridge Thomas (1796-1865), of Columbus, a leader in his State. Her mother was Mary Ann (Shivers) Thomas (1806-1845), daughter of Barnabas Shivers, a notable miller and large planter of his day in Warren County, Georgia. Both parents were of Virginian descent. The father, a native of Hancock County, Georgia, a prosperous planter and slave owner, was prominent in public life as a lawyer, circuit judge, State senator and representative, and soldier in the Indian wars. Jane had five siblings.

== Career ==
In Columbus, on November 7, 1860, she married William Crapon Sibley, of Augusta, Georgia. They had nine children of which six sons and three daughters. Her husband was a Prohibitionist, and their home was the headquarters for temperance workers. Their guests included Kansas Governor St. John and Prof. Hopkins.

The civil war following closely upon her marriage, Sibley accompanied her soldier husband to the camp whenever she could. Then came peace and a move to New Orleans, Louisiana. They became wealthy quickly, but financial reverses followed with enormous debts.

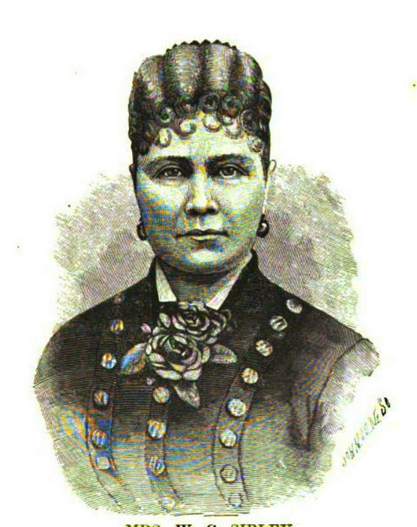
(1888)

They removed again to Georgia, in 1868, and became established in the manufacturing business, Mr. Sibley being president of two large cotton factories, one in Georgia, Sibley Cotton Mills, and another in South Carolina. Wealth flowed and with it, the disposition to dispense it liberally, especially to the needy. At one time, when there was great stagnation in business throughout the country, and factories were closed, and the poor suffered, Mrs. Sibley with her pastor's wife canvassed the city of Augusta for provisions, clothing, medicine, and money for their relief. For two months or more, they continued in this fashion. At another time, when her church was embarrassed with a large debt, and the trustees were about to issue bonds to be paid in twenty years, she with another woman succeeded, by their individual personal appeals to the members of the church and congregation, in raising the money and liquidating the debt.

For years, Sibley taught a Sunday-school among the factory children of her husband's mills. Her Sunday-school work was in a Presbyterian Church, built and given to the factory people by Mr. Sibley. She delivered many public addresses. One of the most important of these was her plea before the State Sunday-school convention on "Sunday-school Work Among the Factory Children."

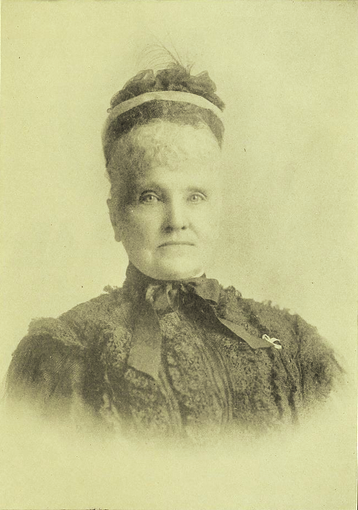
(1914)

She regarded her temperance work as her life-mission. She entered this work under Frances Willard, during her Southern organizing tour in 1881. She attended her lecture under a special protest against "female lecturers"; and she came away the President of the Augusta, Georgia WCTU, which office she held for 20 years. From that time on, she was a staunch and true lover of the cause, working against great opposition, prejudice, and difficulty. At the first Convention of the State WCTU, in Atlanta, in 1882, she was elected State President WCTU, continuing in that position until 1890, when her sister-in-law, Jennie Hart Sibley succeeded her. During the period, she spoke before legislatures and other influential bodies.

She had an immense correspondence in connection with her benevolent and reformatory enterprises. Her work and this willingness to help in benevolent and philanthropic enterprises brought honor in various ways. She was President of the Ladies' Aid Society to the public library, and a Director in the Home for Unfortunate Women. A lodge of Good Templars in Augusta was named for her the Sibley Lodge.

She contributed a large number of articles to various magazines and periodicals.

== Death ==
In later years, she lived in Birmingham, Alabama, She died in that city on April 21, 1930 or Augusta, Georgia, April 22, 1930.
