= Arthur Thomas Drinkwater =

Australian flying ace (1894–1972)

- Born: 3 February 1894; Queenscliff, Victoria, Australia
- Died: 1972; Queensland, Australia
- Military career
- Allegiance: United Kingdom
- Branch: Australian Army; British Army; Royal Air Force
- Service years: 1912–1919
- Rank: Captain
- Units: Royal Australian Engineers; No. 83 Squadron RFC; No. 57 Squadron RFC; No. 40 Squadron RAF
- Conflicts: World War I; Western Front
- Awards: Distinguished Flying Cross
- Other work: Pastoralist

Captain Arthur Thomas Drinkwater DFC (3 February 1894 – 1972), was an Australian-born First World War flying ace. He was credited with nine aerial victories; six of these were scored when Drinkwater was a bomber pilot, making him one of the rare bomber pilot aces.

== Early life ==
Arthur Thomas Drinkwater was born in Queenscliff, Victoria, Australia. His father's name was Alfred Drinkwater. When he enlisted into the Australian Imperial Force on 16 October 1915, he declared he was a natural-born British subject, and a professional soldier. Despite being not quite 22 years old, he claimed two years prior service in a Field Troop and almost four years experience in the Royal Australian Engineers. He was assigned Regimental Number 2842 and posted initially to the 7th Field Company Engineers, seemingly marked for cadre duty.

== World War I ==
Drinkwater was promoted from sapper to sergeant almost immediately. However service in the front lines in France took its toll, and after spending several weeks in various hospitals from April to June 1916, suffering from influenza, on 27 June he was transferred to the Australian Records Section, 3rd Echelon, GHQ, BEF. On 28 October he was transferred again to AIF Headquarters in London.

On 16 March 1917 Drinkwater was discharged from the AIF, on accepting a commission as a second lieutenant in the Royal Flying Corps, and on 20 June he was appointed a flying officer in the RFC. Drinkwater was initially posted to No. 83 Squadron RFC at RAF Spitalgate, Lincolnshire, before being sent to France to serve in No. 57 Squadron, flying bombing missions in an Airco DH.4 two-seater light bomber. Teamed with Frank Menendez as his observer/gunner, he gained his first aerial victory on 18 August 1917, and gained five more victories over the next three months before being withdrawn from combat. He returned to battle the following year, to fly a S.E.5a single-seat fighter in No. 40 Squadron RAF. He would score three more wins while with them.

== List of aerial victories ==
Combat record
| No. | Date/Time | Aircraft/ Serial No. | Opponent | Result | Location | Notes |
|---|---|---|---|---|---|---|
No. 57 Squadron RFC
| 1 | 18 August 1917 @ 1920 hours | Airco DH.4 (A2138) | Albatros D.V | Driven down out of control | Courtrai | Observer/gunner: Frank Menendez |
| 2 | 20 August 1917 @ 1130 hours | Airco DH.4 (A2132) | Albatros D.V | Driven down out of control | Houthoulst Forest | Observer/gunner: Frank Menendez |
| 3 | 21 September 1917 @ 1050 hours | Airco DH.4 (A7851) | Albatros D.V | Destroyed | Dadizeele | Observer/gunner: Frank Menendez |
| 4 | 21 September 1917 @ 1050 hours | Airco DH.4 (A7851) | Albatros D.V | Destroyed | Dadizeele | Observer/gunner: Frank Menendez |
| 5 | 21 November 1917 @ 1145 hours | Airco DH.4 (A7424) | Albatros D.V | Driven down out of control | South-east of Houthoulst Forest | Observer/gunner: Frank Menendez |
| 6 | 21 November 1917 @ 1145 hours | Airco DH.4 (A7424) | Albatros D.V | Driven down out of control | South-east of Houthoulst Forest | Observer/gunner: Frank Menendez |
No. 40 Squadron RAF
| 7 | 17 September 1918 @ 0955 hours | S.E.5a (E5982) | Fokker D.VII | Driven down out of control | South-east of Cambrai | |
| 8 | 1 October 1918 @ 1245 hours | S.E.5a (F5527) | Halberstadt reconnaissance aircraft | Set afire; destroyed | North of Cambrai | |
| 9 | 9 October 1918 @ 0740 hours | S.E.5a (E4036) | Fokker D.VII | Driven down out of control | North-east of Cambrai | |

== Post-war career ==
His Distinguished Flying Cross was awarded on 3 June 1919. A month later, on 3 July 1919, he departed England for Australia on the Prinz Hubertus; he was expressly manifested as not part of the Australian Imperial Force. While he was at sea, on 15 July 1919, he was transferred to the unemployed list of the Royal Air Force.

Australian newspapers of the post-war era carry several notices of a pastoralist named Arthur. T. Drinkwater, though it cannot be definitively confirmed that this was the ace. (Note: Though he is identified as an ex-officer of the RAF, who began farming immediately after the Great War, so seems likely.) He held a farm in Annuello, north of Manangatang in the Mallee, as part of the soldier settlement scheme for returned veterans. Arthur T. Drinkwater settled in the early 1920s on Geera block number 13, county Karkarooc. He also appears on Annuello Block 25, county Annuello. Arthur Drinkwater was made honorary secretary of the Green Mallee Council, a group of settlers who lobbied the Closer Settlement Board with the aim of gaining compensation for those settlers who were forced off their blocks through drought and of blocks which were re-allocated due to the original allocations being too small being marginal land. Arthur T. Drinkwater was also involved with the local community in establishing the Annuello Hall. The hall was the venue for the towns first school as well as church services, public meetings of the various local organisations (including the RAOB) and the popular Saturday night dances where he sang with such talent to be regular and well received performer. This is at a time when long time resident, Jim Taggert, reported that on Saturdays, up to a hundred and fifty people could be seen in the main street.

Drinkwater died in 1972 in Queensland, Australia.

== Bibliography ==
- Franks, Norman; Guest, Russell F. & Alegi, Gregory (1997). Above the War Fronts: The British Two-seater Bomber Pilot and Observer Aces, the British Two-seater Fighter Observer Aces, and the Belgian, Italian, Austro-Hungarian and Russian Fighter Aces, 1914–1918. London, UK: Grub Street. ISBN 978-1-898697-56-5.
