= Jenna Norton =

American public health scientist

- Education: George Washington University; Uniformed Services University of the Health Sciences
- Known for: Bethesda Declaration
- Children: 3
- Scientific career
- Fields: Public health, health disparities, epidemiology
- Workplaces: National Institutes of Health
- Doctoral advisor: Tracey Koehlmoos

Jenna M. Norton is an American public health scientist and program director at the National Institute of Diabetes and Digestive and Kidney Diseases. Her work focuses on epidemiology, health data standards, and addressing health disparities. In 2025, Norton helped organize the Bethesda Declaration, an open letter critical of the second Trump administration.

== Education ==
Norton earned a M.P.H. in environmental and occupational science from George Washington University in 2011. She completed a Ph.D. in public health at the Uniformed Services University of the Health Sciences in 2021. Her dissertation was titled, "Prevalence and Social Determinants of Kidney Diseases among Active and Retired Military Personnel and Adult Dependents." Tracey Koehlmoos was her doctoral adviser.

== Career ==
Norton is a program director at the National Institute of Diabetes and Digestive and Kidney Diseases (NIDDK). She supports efforts to implement health disparities research, with an emphasis on the role social determinants play in kidney and urologic health, disease, and racial, ethnic and socioeconomic disparities. Within the kidney health disparities field, her focus is on epidemiology and interventions that occur in community settings.

Norton supports urologic dissemination, implementation research, and work advancing health information technology and data standards in kidney research and care in order to improve interoperability of data. In collaboration with colleagues at the Agency for Healthcare Research and Quality, Norton co-leads the Electronic (e-) Care Plan for People with Multiple Chronic Conditions Project, which aims to develop a standards-based e-care plan that can interface with the electronic health record to aggregate critical, patient-centered health and social data and share that data across clinical, community, home and research settings.

In June 2025, Norton was an organizer of the Bethesda Declaration, an open letter signed by hundreds of current and former National Institutes of Health (NIH) employees that criticized the termination of NIH grants, contract cancellations, and what the signers described as politicalization of scientific priorities under the second Trump administration.

On November 13, 2025, the first day following a U.S. federal government shutdown and two hours after a speech urging colleagues to speak up in their personal capacity, Norton was placed on nondisciplinary administrative leave. Represented by civil rights lawyer Debra Katz, she filed a federal whistleblower complaint. She asserted that agency leadership engaged in illegal retaliation against her for First Amendment protected speech. In May 2026, Norton was reinstated to her position at the NIDDK and notified to return to work. A U.S. Department of Health and Human Services (DHHS) official familiar with the matter told Stat that Norton was placed on leave because she "constantly criticize[d] this administration" instead of focusing on her job. The official spoke on condition of anonymity. NIH director Jay Bhattacharya later said DHHS was investigating possible violations of the Antideficiency Act and communications policy. Norton and her lawyer disputed those characterizations, stating that her participation in the Bethesda Declaration was First Amendment-protected speech and that no valid basis for the leave was found.

== Personal life ==
Norton is married and has three children.
