= Jenna Lester =

American dermatologist

- Education: Harvard University; Brown University
- Scientific career
- Workplaces: University of California, San Francisco

Jenna Lester is an American dermatologist and faculty member at the University of California, San Francisco (UCSF). Lester founded the UCSF Skin of Color Clinic, where she is the director. The clinic looks to address health disparities by providing dermatological care to people of color.

== Early life and education ==
Lester was born into a family of healthcare workers. Her grandmother, Ruby Brangman, worked as a nurse practitioner, and her mother, Sharon Brangman, is a geriatrician. Her grandmother was one of the first Black women to work as a nurse practitioner in the state of New York. Lester realised that she wanted to be a physician at a young age; her mother set the example. Their family story was featured by NPR's Story Corps.

Lester earned her undergraduate degree at Harvard University. She eventually studied medicine at Brown University, where she was elected to the medical honour society Alpha Omega Alpha. Black people are underrepresented in medicine, and this underrepresentation gives rise to a cycle of health disparities for Black people. Lester was encouraged by her father to specialise in dermatology. Whilst she was at medical school, a Black patient presented with psoriasis, but none of the physicians could diagnose the condition because they had not been trained in how to identify it on dark skin. In fact, in a survey of dermatologists in 2011, half of the participants reported that they could not diagnose conditions on Black skin.

== Research and career ==
Lester has worked to train physicians how to identify dermatological conditions on skin of colour and is a leader in equity in dermatology. She established the first UCSF Skin of Color program and clinic, where she serves as the director. The programme focuses on research, education and clinical care. Her work and research has been nationally and internationally recognized for tackling inequities in dermatology. In 2019, the San Francisco Chronicle described Lester as the only Black dermatologist working in San Francisco. She was also featured on NPR's Science Friday with Ira Flatow where she reviewed some the differing features of skin disease across skin tones.

She is a member of the American Academy of Dermatology, where she sits on the committee for Augmented Intelligence, a working group that provides expert advice regarding the use of artificial intelligence in dermatology.

During the COVID-19 pandemic it emerged that occasionally coronavirus presented as skin disorders (including so-called COVID toes). Whilst it was well known that coronavirus disease disproportionately impacts people of colour, in the countless scientific papers documenting the dermatological manifestations of the disease Lester noticed a distinct underrepresentation of non-white patients. She was the first person to publish about these disparities, and subsequently profiled in the New York Times.

== Select publications ==
- Markova, Alina; Lester, Jenna; Wang, Joanne; Robinson-Bostom, Leslie (2012). "Diagnosis of Common Dermopathies in Dialysis Patients: A Review and Update". Seminars in Dialysis. 25 (4): 408–418. doi:10.1111/j.1525-139X.2012.01109.x. ISSN 1525-139X. PMID 22809004. S2CID 34265014.
- Lester, Jenna; Weinstock, Martin A. (2014-05-01). "Teletriage for Provision of Dermatologic Care: A Pilot Program in the Department of Veterans Affairs". Journal of Cutaneous Medicine and Surgery. 18 (3): 170–173. doi:10.2310/7750.2013.13086. ISSN 1203-4754. PMID 24800704. S2CID 2117060.
- Lester, Jenna; Wintroub, Bruce; Linos, Eleni (2016-08-01). "Disparities in Academic Dermatology". JAMA Dermatology. 152 (8): 878–879. doi:10.1001/jamadermatol.2016.1533. ISSN 2168-6068. PMC 5489352. PMID 27192666.
- Lester, J., Jia, J., Zhang, L., Okoye, G. and Linos, E. (2020), "Absence of images of skin of colour in publications of COVID‐19 skin manifestations". British Journal of Dermatology. 183: 593–595. doi:10.1111/bjd.19258
