= Jenny Bruso =

American hiker and influencer

- Occupations: Body positivity activist, influencer
- Years active: 2016-present
- Known for: Unlikely Hikers Instagram
- Website: jennybruso.com

Jenny Bruso is an American hiker, influencer, and an activist for inclusivity and body positivity. She is best known for starting the Instagram account Unlikely Hikers in 2016 in Portland, Oregon. She is an adviser to outdoor fitness companies looking to break into alternative markets.

== Career ==
Bruso went on her first outdoor hike in 2012. Describing herself as "never an outdoorsy kid", she states that she became 'obsessed' after her first hikes in the Columbia River Gorge. Bruso observed that most people she encountered while hiking did not look like her. Bruso describes herself as "femme, queer, and fat", and she became aware of how she was perceived by others hikers and the outdoor recreation industry in general.

Almost immediately, I found people filling in those gaps—like Latino Outdoors and Outdoor Afro. But because I wasn’t seeing much about queer and fat hikers, I felt like I really needed to do something.

— Jenny Bruso

In 2016, Bruso created the Unlikely Hikers Instagram account to highlight "the outdoor experiences of Black, Indigenous and people of color and those in LGBTQ communities." Bruso credits her Instagram in helping her to connect with a more representative outdoor community. In addition to focusing on diversity, Unlikely Hikers focuses on environmental issues as well as outdoor retail.

In 2018, Unlikely Hikers joined with 23 other groups to form Diversify Outdoors, a coalition dedicated to promoting diversity in the outdoors. Other founding members include Ambreen Tariq who founded @BrownPeopleCamping, an Instagram account with a similar focus on outdoor recreational activity.

Based on the popularity of Bruso's Instagram feed, Unlikely Hikers was recruited by REI to be a brand ambassador. REI's director of marketing commented that REI "understand[s] that to be relevant in the world, we need to recruit younger, more multi-cultural audiences". Bruso has also partnered with backpack retailers to expand their plus-size offerings, and in 2021, Gregory Packs unveiled a new line of backpacks made to fit multiple body shapes and sizes. Unlikely Hikers has also collaborated with other outdoor retailers including Merrell.

As of 2022, Bruso is a full-time adviser to companies looking to break into alternative markets. Bruso continues to lead hiking groups, teaching people across a range of experience levels, ranging from beginners to advanced.

== Awards and honors ==
- In 2019, Bruso was selected for the Grist 50, an annual list of people taking environmental action
- In 2019, Bruso was the winner of an Inspiration Award for the "Most Inspiring Individual" award from Outdoor Retailer

== See also ==
- Fat feminism
- Justice, Equity, Diversity, and Inclusion
