= Jenn Donahue =

American businesswoman, seismic engineer and leadership coach

- Education: Texas A&M University; University of California, Berkeley
- Occupation: Businesswoman
- Notable work: The Last Seabee Battalion in Afghanistan

Jennifer L. Donahue is an American businesswoman, seismic engineer, and leadership coach. She is the founder and incumbent president of JL Donahue Engineering.

Donahue has served as a US Navy Captain in Iraq and Afghanistan.

== Early life and education ==
Donahue was educated at Texas A&M University. Later, she completed her doctorate degree with specialization in geotechnical earthquake engineering from University of California, Berkeley College of Engineering.

== Career ==
Donahue joined the US Navy in 1996 and served in the Civil Engineer Corps before joining the reserve component in 2000.

In 2011, she traveled to Japan to analyze the earthquake which triggered a tsunami. She also went to Samoa after the 8.1 earthquake.

She has also taught courses at University of California, Berkeley and University of California, Los Angeles. Currently, she lectures at California Polytechnic State University.

Donahue is the founder of JL Donahue Engineering, a notable seismic analysis and engineering firm, which is based in California.

== Publication ==
- The Last Seabee Battalion in Afghanistan
