= Jennie Joseph =

Jennie Joseph is a midwife active in the field of maternal health, particularly regarding social and ethnic birthing disparities.

== Early life ==
Joseph studied midwifery in the United Kingdom, her home country. In 1989, she moved to Orlando, Florida, following her partner. Once in the United States, she realized that she had fewer career prospects, due to a lack of knowledge about what midwives do in the country and regulations in the field. Joseph advocated for regulations preventing certified professional midwives (CPM) from practicing. In 1995, she opened a midwifery school.

In 2009, she created the Common-sense Childbirth School of Midwifery, hoping to support women without access to Ob-gyns, who go to the emergency room when in labor. Commonsense Childbirth Inc. operates health clinics and a birthing center, as well as the school. Joseph formulated the maternity-care model The JJ Way, an evidence-based model aimed at reducing birthing disparities. The model aims to help Black women and other marginalized people be safe and empowered within the maternity health systems. Joseph created the term "materno-toxic" to describe the ways the life-threatening impact birthing disparities have on marginalized mothers. Her methods have seen success, with almost all of her patients– most of whom are in groups that face birthing disparities– giving birth to healthy, full-term babies. An evaluation by the West Orange Health Care District found that her patients had significantly lower rates of pre-term birth and low-infant birth weights. It also found that her patients of African descent were almost 40 percent less likely than their national equivalent to have pre-term labor or low-infant birth weights.

In 2020, the Common-sense Childbirth School of Midwifery was accredited by the Midwifery Education Accreditation Council, making her the first Black woman in the United States to privately own a nationally accredited midwifery school.

Joseph also founded the National Perinatal Task Force, a grassroots organization working to eliminate racial disparities in American maternal-child health. She also founded The Council of Midwifery Elders. She is on the Advisory Council for the Congressional Black Maternal Health Caucus and a Fellow of the Aspen Institute.

== Personal life ==
Joseph is an honorary member of Zeta Phi Beta sorority; she was inducted on July 27, 2024 at the sorority's Boulé in Indianapolis, Indiana.

== Awards ==
- 2022: Time (magazine) Woman of the Year
- Zeta Phi Beta Honorary Member
