= Jenny Gusyk =

First woman and first foreign student of the University of Cologne

- Born: 29 May 1897; Vilkaviškis, Congress Poland
- Died: 2 January 1944 (aged 46); Auschwitz concentration camp, Occupied Poland
- Other name: Jenny Stucke
- Citizenship: Russian (1897–1910s),, German (1927–1944)
- Education: University of Cologne
- Known for: First woman and first foreign student of the University of Cologne
- Spouse: Karl Stucke (m. 1927–1940)
- Children: 1

Jenny Gusyk 29 May 1897 – 2 January 1944), also known as Jenny Stucke, was the first woman and foreign student when enrolled at the newly-re-established University of Cologne in 1919. A Jewish woman of Russian and German citizenship, she received German citizenship after her marriage, and was murdered in the Auschwitz concentration camp. In 2009, the University of Cologne announced a gender equality award named after her.

== Origin and early life ==
The Guzyk family had immigrated from Constantinople in the Ottoman Empire (present-day Istanbul in Turkey), to Vilkaviškis (in present-day Lithuania), a small town with a large German population of Suwałki County in the Russian-controlled Congress Poland. Jenny Gusyk was born in the town as the eldest child of Jewish parents Leon and Diana Gusyk, née Kawan, on 29 May 1897. She had one sister, Rebekka, and twin brothers, Max and Paul.

She briefly attended a high school. In 1911, when she was 13 years old, the six-person family fled west from the pogroms against the Jewish population in the Russian Empire that followed the assassination of Alexander II of Russia. They settled in the Rhinish town of Gräfrath at Solingen, then in the Kingdom of Prussia. Her father acquired a long-established steel goods factory, and traded in cutlery. She attended the Lyceum in Solingen, later August-Dicke-Schule, together with her sister, and graduated with a Mittlere Reife.

There was widespread hostility towards Russia and the Russians in Prussia at that time. As a precaution, in order to be spared reprisals, her father, whose place of birth was registered in his passport as Constantinople, went to Istanbul in 1913. He obtained Turkish citizenship for himself again and for his family members. His residence address was given as "Bereketzade Medrese No. 20, Pera Quarter, Constantinople", a location near the Galata Tower in today's Beyoğlu district.

After finishing school, Gusyk worked in her father's factory shop in Solingen as an intern. She then completed a commercial apprenticeship at the Barmer Bank-Verein in Solingen. By October 1918, her mother had died, and the next day her 16-year-old brother Paul succumbed to the Spanish flu.

== University years ==
In the summer of 1917, Gusyk went to Cologne and began her first higher education at the Handels-Hochschule Cöln (Trade College of Cologne). On 11 April 1919, Gusyk enrolled as the first woman, first foreigner, and first student from Solingen at the Faculty of Management, Economics and Social Sciences of the newly re-established University of Cologne under the matriculation number 2. The university was the successor of the Trade College of Cologne. Gusyk's student life did not pass relatively carefree. Her father left Solingen to move to Hamburg, and then to Berlin, imposing new duties on her. She took over and managed the cutlery business in Gräfrath, and became the representative head of the family consisting of her sister and brother. Her siblings also moved to Cologne to live with her.

Gusyk studied business administration, economic history, and law. After seven semesters, she passed the commercial diploma examination, and graduated in 1921 with distinction. During her education, she was also politically active. She was the only woman among the 51 graduates in the winter semester 1920/21. During her university days, her male fellow students called her the "Genia", especially for her admiration for the feminist ideas of the Russian writer Alexandra Kollontai. Her thesis on the French socialist and pacifist Jean Jaurès indicates her personal confession as a leftist.

Gusyk's academic career ended when her already completed doctoral thesis was not accepted by her conservative doctoral supervisor, Christian Eckert, because it was "too much penetrated with communist ideas".

== Berlin years ==
In 1923, Gusyk followed her father to Berlin and settled in Charlottenburg. There, she worked as a manager and accountant at a company. She married Karl Stucke, seven years her senior, the son of a master tailor from Bremen. On 27 November 1927, she gave birth to her only child, (Hans) Thomas.

Karl and his younger brother Fritz regularly worked for left-wing radical newspapers, especially for Die Rote Fahne, the central organ of the Communist Party of Germany. With Adolf Hitler's rise to power, anti-communism and antisemitism emerged in Germany. In 1933, Gusyk's husband was taken into protective custody and was incarcerated in a concentration camp. When he was released a long time afterwards, he had no chance to pursue his journalistic profession. He took on jobs such as tailoring in a struggle to make a living. He was arrested again in 1939, and was ultimately sent to the Sachsenhausen concentration camp. As told by family members, Gusyk could visit her husband there only once. Stucke was murdered in the concentration camp on 14 January 1940, and was buried near the "Socialists' Memorial" at the Zentralfriedhof Friedrichsfelde in Berlin, where notable leaders of the socialist and communist movement are interred.

After the death of her husband, Gusyk lost all privileges of the so-called "mixed marriage" that she had obtained through her marriage to an Aryan of Protestant lineage. Upon her marriage, she had lost her Turkish citizenship, and had received her husband's German citizenship. She went into hiding to avoid persecution as a Jew. In 1942, her sister Rebekka fled to the United States via France and Portugal. Although Gusyk had an exit visa for her son and herself since the spring of 1940, she remained in Berlin, probably to care for her aging father. In January 1943, her father died in the nursing home of the Jewish community in Berlin. Gusyk, now blocked by Nazi law, was no longer able to leave Germany.

== Arrest and death ==
In June 1943, Gusyk was arrested after being denounced, and was jailed in the Gestapo prison on Prinz-Albrecht-Straße. She was transferred to the Mecklenburg Prison, then back to Berlin's Lehrter Straße Prison in Moabit. From there, she was deported to the Auschwitz concentration camp like her brother Max and sister-in-law Lydia Gusyk. She was murdered on 2 January 1944, at the age of 46.

Gusyk's son Thomas Stucke survived World War II in Berlin, thanks to the support of his father's political comrades.

== Legacy ==
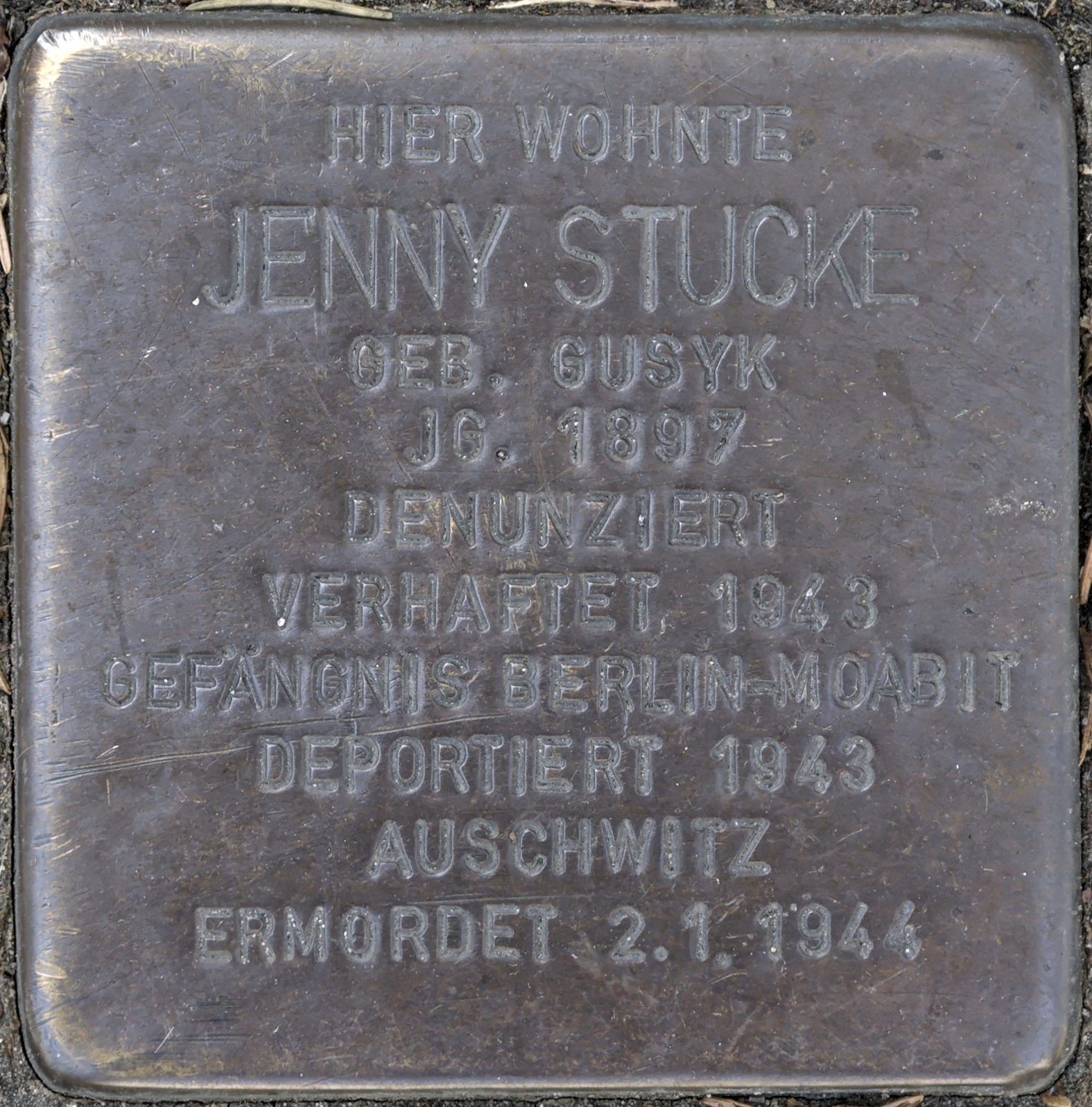
Commemorative stone at the residence of Jenny Stucke in Wuppertaler Str. 36, Solingen

In 2009, the University of Cologne announced a gender equality award, the Jenny Gusyk Prize, with the consent of her son Thomas in the United States. Three prizes are awarded annually in the fields of Equality/Gender- and/or Queer Studies/Family-Friendly Management, as follows:

- Jenny Gusyk "Young Scientists Award" of €1,000
- Jenny Gusyk "Innovation Award" of €3,000
- Jenny Gusyk Award "Family Friendly Leadership" of €1,000

Gusyk was memorialized with a Stolperstein in Solingen.

== Bibliography ==
- Rosenbaum, Wilhelm (2003). Jenny Gusyk - Jüdin, Türkin, Solingerin: die Biografie der ersten Studentin an der Universität zu Köln (in German). Stadtarchiv Solingen. p. 147. ISBN 3-928-956-132.
- Wittka, Marina (1995). "Genia statt Genius – Die erste Studentin der Universität zu Köln". Genia - Nur für Frauen: Lese- und Handbuch für Studentinnen (in German). M & T Verlag. ISBN 3-9804489-0-8.
- Franken, Irene (1995). "Ja, das Studium der Weiber ist schwer!" Studentinnen und Dozentinnen an der Kölner Universität bis 1933 (PDF) (in German). M & T Verlag. OCLC 495919597.
