= Jenn Bennett =

- Born: March 1978 (age 48); Frankfurt am Main, Germany
- Education: Louisiana State University (BFA)
- Occupation: Novelist
- Writing career
- Years active: 2011–present
- Genres: Young adult fiction; coming of age; historical romance
- Notable works: Alex, Approximately; The Anatomical Shape of a Heart
- Notable awards: RITA award – Young Adult Romance; 2016 The Anatomical Shape of a Heart
- Website: jennbennett.net

Jenn Bennett (born March 1978) is an American author of novels for teens and adults. Her notable works include Alex, Approximately, Starry Eyes, and The Anatomical Shape of a Heart (also known as Night Owls).

== Life ==
Bennett was born in Germany and has a Bachelor of Fine Arts in painting. Due to her father's service in the United States Army, she grew up as a military brat, moving to a number of places, and has traveled extensively in Europe and East Asia. She resides near Atlanta with her husband.

== Career ==
=== Arcadia Bell series ===
Bennett's debut novel, Kindling the Moon, was released from Pocket Books in July 2011, and is the first book in the Arcadia Bell series. The final book in the series, Banishing the Dark, was published in 2015; it was nominated for a Romantic Times Reviewers’ Choice Award for Urban Fantasy Worldbuilding.

=== Roaring Twenties series ===
In 2013, Berkley Books published the first instalment in Bennett's historical Roaring Twenties paranormal romance series, Bitter Spirits, taking place in a haunted 1920s San Francisco. It garnered starred reviews from both Publishers Weekly and Booklist and was one of six romances to be named on Publishers Weekly's Best Books of 2014. The final book in the series, Grave Phantoms, was awarded the Romantic Times' Seal of Excellence.

=== Young adult fiction ===
In 2015, Feiwel published Bennett's debut young adult contemporary book, The Anatomical Shape of a Heart, a romance between two aspiring teen artists. Titled Night Owls internationally, foreign rights for the book were acquired by Simon & Schuster UK. It won a 2015 Romantic Times Reviewers' Choice Award for Young Adult Protagonist and the 2016 RITA Award for Young Adult Romance.

In 2017, Simon & Schuster published her second young adult book, Alex, Approximately, a retelling of You've Got Mail. It received starred reviews from Kirkus Reviews and Booklist.

Bennett's third young adult book, Starry Eyes, about two teens who get lost in the California wilderness, was published in 2018, received a starred review from Kirkus Reviews, and was nominated for a Goodreads Choice Award for Young Adult Fiction.

== Publications ==
=== Arcadia Bell series ===
1. Kindling the Moon (July 2011, ISBN 978-1-4516-2052-8)
2. Summoning the Night (April 2012, ISBN 978-1-4516-2053-5)
3. Leashing the Tempest (December 2012, ISBN 978-1-4516-9507-6)
4. Binding the Shadows (May 2013, ISBN 978-1-4516-9508-3)
5. Banishing the Dark (May 2014, ISBN 978-1-4516-9509-0)

=== Roaring Twenties series ===
1. Bitter Spirits (January 2014, ISBN 978-0-4252-6957-2)
2. Grim Shadows (June 2014, ISBN 978-0-4252-6958-9)
3. Grave Phantoms (May 2015, ISBN 978-0-4252-8076-8)

=== Young adult books ===
- The Anatomical Shape of a Heart – UK edition titled Night Owls (November 2015, ISBN 978-1-2500-6645-9)
- Alex, Approximately (April 2017, ISBN 978-1-4814-7877-9)
- Starry Eyes (April 2018, ISBN 978-1-4814-7880-9)
- Serious Moonlight (April 2019, ISBN 978-1-5344-2514-9)
- The Lady Rogue (September 2019, ISBN 978-1-5344-3199-7)
- Chasing Lucky (May 2020, ISBN 978-1-5344-2517-0)
- Always Jane (March 2022, ISBN 978-1-5344-8232-6)
- The Prince of Mourning (October 2025, ISBN 978-1-6659-7155-3)

=== Children's books ===
- Grumbones (August 2023, ISBN 978-1-6659-3031-4)
- Knight Thieves (July 2024, ISBN 978-1-6659-3034-5)

== Awards ==
- 2015 - Romantic Times Reviewers' Choice Award, Young Adult Protagonist – The Anatomical Shape of a Heart
- 2016 - Romance Writers of America RITA Award, Young Adult Romance – The Anatomical Shape of a Heart
