= Jenny Berrigan =

American snowboarder (born 1983)

Personal information
- Born: September 2, 1983 (age 41)

Sport
- Sport: Snowboarding

Jenny Berrigan (born 2 September 1983) is a deaf American female snowboarder. She represented the United States at the 2015 Winter Deaflympics.
