= Iena =

Iena may refer to:

- Jena, city in Germany (French: Iéna, Greek: Ιένα, Latin: Iena)
- Pont d'Iéna, a Parisian bridge spanning the River Seine
- French ship Iéna, various ships
- Iéna station, a Paris Metro station
- Palais d'Iéna, see list of monuments historiques in Paris
- IENA (car), a former Italian automobile
- I.E.N.A., album of the Italian rapper Clementino
- IENA (International Exchange of North America, one of the largest BridgeUSA and J-1 Visa Sponsors in America and Cultural Exchange provider
