= 526 Jena =

Main-belt asteroid

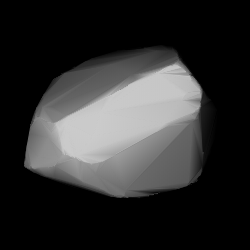
- Modelled shape of Jena from its lightcurve

Discovery
- Discovered by: Max Wolf
- Discovery site: Heidelberg
- Discovery date: 14 March 1904

Designations
- Pronunciation: /ˈdʒɛnə/, German: [ˈjeːnaː]
- Alternative designations: 1904 NQ

Orbital characteristics
- Epoch 31 July 2016 (JD 2457600.5)
- Uncertainty parameter 0
- Observation arc: 112.05 yr (40927 d)
- Aphelion: 3.5421 AU (529.89 Gm)
- Perihelion: 2.7014 AU (404.12 Gm)
- Semi-major axis: 3.1218 AU (467.01 Gm)
- Eccentricity: 0.13464
- Orbital period (sidereal): 5.52 yr (2014.7 d)
- Mean anomaly: 174.835°
- Mean motion: 0° 10^{m} 43.284^{s} / day
- Inclination: 2.1735°
- Longitude of ascending node: 137.776°
- Argument of perihelion: 357.408°

Physical characteristics
- Mean radius: 20.745±1 km
- Synodic rotation period: 9.474 h (0.3948 d)
- Geometric albedo: 0.0877±0.009
- Absolute magnitude (H): 10.17

526 Jena is a Themistian asteroid. It was discovered in Heidelberg by the German astronomer Max Wolf on 14 March 1904 and named after the city of Jena.
