= Sibley (automobile) =

Defunct American motor vehicle manufacturer

Sibley Motor Car Company
- Industry: Automotive
- Founded: 1910; 116 years ago
- Founder: F. M. Sibley
- Defunct: 1911; 115 years ago
- Fate: Closed, factory repossessed
- Successor: followed by; Sibley-Curtiss Motor Company
- Headquarters: Detroit, Michigan, United States
- Key people: Eugene Sibley, J. G. Utz, C.P. Warner
- Products: Automobiles
- Production output: unknown (1911-1912)

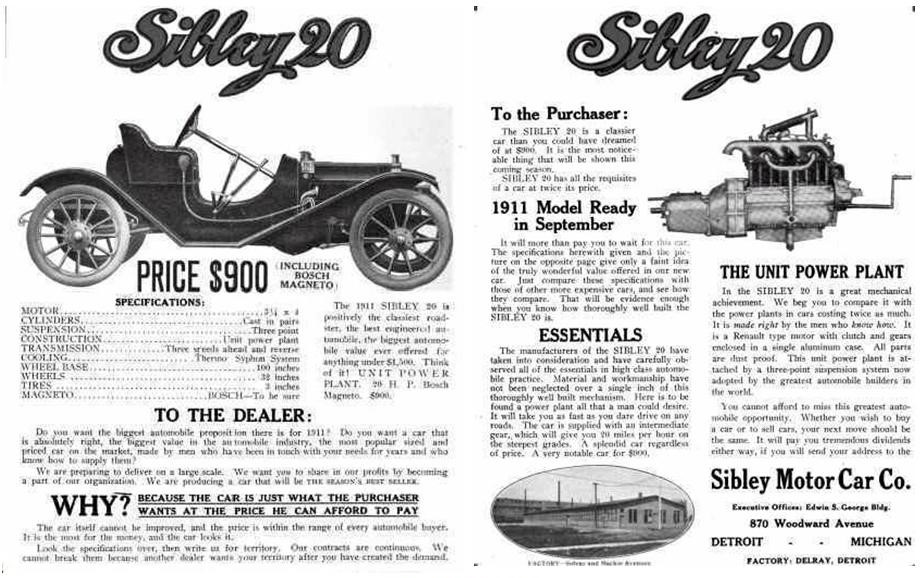
1910 Sibley Model 20 - 2-page advertisement in Motor Age

The Sibley car was manufactured by the Sibley Motor Car Co in Detroit, Michigan from 1910 to 1911. In 1911 Eugene Sibley introduced the Sibley-Curtiss in Simsbury, Connecticut, but few were sold.

== Sibley ==
F. M. Sibley, a Michigan lumber dealer, financed the Sibley Motor Car Company for his son Eugene Sibley. J. G. Utz, formerly chief engineer for Chalmers was hired to design the car. C. P. Warner serve as president and Eugene Sibley was Secretary-Treasurer. Company offices were at 870 Woodward Avenue. The former plant of the Detroit Valve and Fittings Company was leased for the factory.

The Sibley 20 was a two-seat roadster with a 4-cylinder 3.6 liter engine rated at 30-hp. The engine was mated to a 3-speed selective transmission on a 106-inch wheelbase and priced at $900, equivalent to $31,098 in 2025. In January 1911 Detroit Valve and Fittings sued to recover its plant, charging default on the lease agreement.

== Sibley-Curtiss ==
In the fall of 1911, Eugene Sibley and Joseph J. Curtiss formed the Sibley-Curtiss Motor Company in Simsbury, Connecticut. Curtiss was a Simsbury automobile dealer for Velie, Hupmobile and Cartercar. The stated purpose of the new company was the manufacture of automobiles, however a Simsbury resident who was there at the time, recalls that the real plan was to purchase the previous year's models of another Connecticut manufacturer and market them under the Sibley-Curtiss name. Only two Sibley-Curtiss cars were sold during the winter of 1911-1912.
