= William Crapon Sibley =

American business executive (1832–1902)

William Crapon Sibley (1832–1902) was a 19th-century American business executive in the American South. He served as president of the Sibley Manufacturing company of Augusta, Georgia.

== Early life and education ==
William Crapon Sibley was born in Augusta, Georgia, May 3, 1832. He is the ninth in lineal descent from John Sibley of St Albans, Hertfordshire, England, who in 1629 settled in Salem, Massachusetts and later in Charlestown, Boston, Massachusetts. His father, Josiah Sibley, of Uxbridge, Massachusetts, removed to Augusta, Georgia, in 1821, and died there in 1888. His mother was Sarah Ann, daughter of William Crapon of Providence, Rhode Island.

He received his education at private schools, and was prepared for college at the Richmond County Academy, Augusta, but decided to forego a collegiate course.

== Career ==
Although prepared for college at the age of sixteen, he clerked in the general store of his father, at Hamburg, South Carolina, continuing in that capacity for five years, when he was made a partner. In 1856, the cotton and commission house of J. Sibley & Son was formed in Augusta, Georgia; his brother, Samuel H., being added two years later, the style of the firm was changed to Josiah Sibley & Sons.

He was elected a member of the city council of Augusta in 1859, and served two years.

=== Civil War ===
In November, 1861, he enlisted in the Confederate States Army as a private in Company B, Oglethorpe infantry, Georgia state troops, and served for six months on the coast; the regiment of which he was a member was discharged, the term of enlistment having expired. Then joining the Oglethorpe artillery, he was made quartermaster sergeant, and six weeks later, commissary, with the rank of captain, of Gen. John K. Jackson's brigade. Joining Braxton Bragg's army at Tupelo, Mississippi, he served throughout the Kentucky campaign, remaining with that branch of the army until the retreat to Dalton, when he was retired on account of broken health.

=== Post-war ===
In November, 1865, at New Orleans, Louisiana, he formed the shipping and commission firm of Sibley, Guion & Co., which was dissolved in 1867, Mr. Sibley doing business there alone until the spring of 1870, when he returned to Augusta, Georgia, to accept the presidency of the Langley Cotton Manufacturing company of South Carolina, with its main office in Augusta, Georgia; also forming the cotton firm of Dunbar & Sibley of Augusta, which was dissolved in 1877.

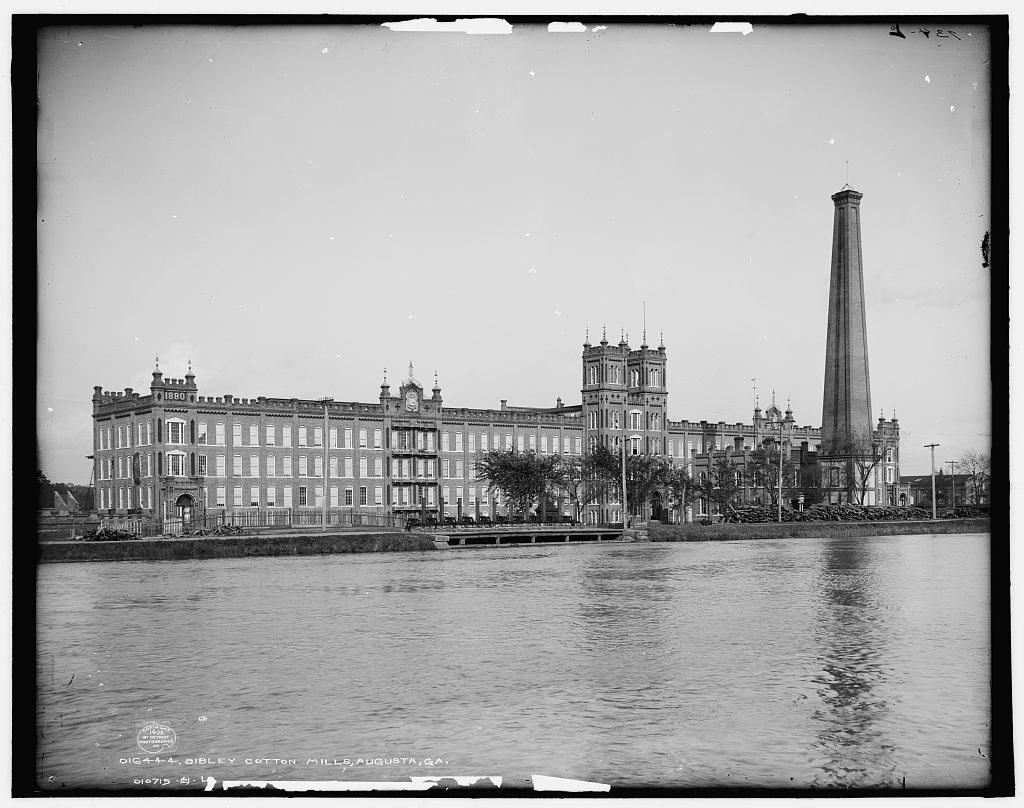
Sibley Mill (c. 1903)

In 1880, he was made president of the Sibley Manufacturing company of Augusta, manufacturing colored and other goods, which in 1895, had in operation 40,256 spindles, and 1,109 looms. In 1889, he resigned the presidency of the Langley Manufacturing company in order to devote his entire attention to the Sibley mills. Among the cotton-mill presidents of the south, none surpassed him in successful administration. His factories were patterns of successful management.

He had other extensive business interests that claimed a portion of his time, being president of the Coaldale Brick & Tile company of Alabama, of the Warrior Coal & Coke company, also of Alabama; the Round Mountain Coal & Iron company of Alabama. In addition, he was a director of the Commercial bank of Augusta.

== Personal life ==
He was married, in November, 1860, to Jane E. (Thomas) Sibley, daughter of Judge Grigsby Eskridge Thomas of Columbus, Georgia. The couple had six sons and three daughter. Mrs. Sibley was a leader among the temperance crusaders of Georgia, having been president of the Woman's Christian Temperance Union of her state for many years. She led her husband to become an active elder in the Presbyterian church.

William C. Sibley died on 17 April 17, 1902, in Augusta, Georgia.
