= Ambreen Tariq =

Activist and children's author

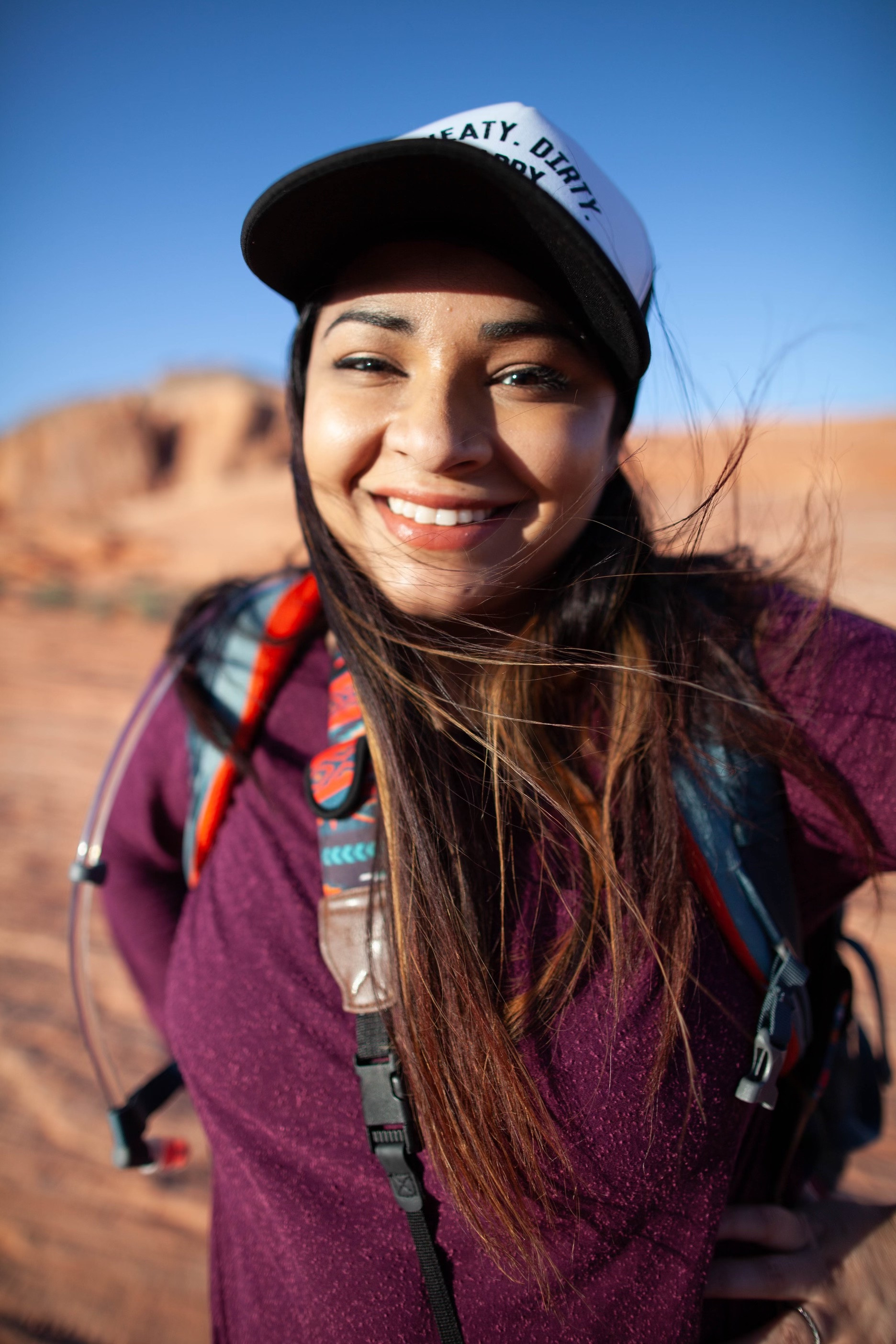
- Ambreen Tariq (2018)
- Occupations: Attorney; activist; author
- Years active: 2016-present
- Organization: @BrownPeopleCamping (founder)
- Notable work: Fatima's Great Outdoors

Ambreen Tariq is an American activist and children's author whose work focuses on outdoor recreation, accessibility, and social justice. In 2016, Tariq founded @BrownPeopleCamping, an Instagram account that highlights the recreational experiences of people of color and immigrants in the United States. Her writing has been featured in Outside magazine, and in 2020 she published her debut children's book, Fatima's Great Outdoors. She has been profiled by The New York Times, NPR, CNN Health, Elite Daily, and more.

Tariq is a first generation member of the Diversify Outdoors Coalition, a founding member of the Outdoorist Oath, an advisor to the Outdoor Alliance for Kids, and an advisory council member of the Sierra Club's Outdoors For All campaign. Tariq previously served on the board of directors of the Appalachian Trail Conservancy and Green Muslims. In addition to her advocacy and writing, Tariq is a non-practicing attorney. She is currently based in the Washington, D.C., area.

== BrownPeopleCamping ==
Ambreen Tariq, whose family emigrated to the U.S. from India, learned to camp with family in Minnesota. Tariq, who is Muslim, created Brown People Camping after noting the lack of diversity she saw while camping at Shenandoah National Park in Virginia's Blue Ridge Mountains. The Instagram account seeks to promote greater diversity on public lands through storytelling and the power of visual representation. As of March 2022, the account has nearly 32,000 followers. The account's popularity led to brand ambassadorships with several outdoor recreation companies, including L.L. Bean, Merrell, REI, and Airstream, and has been covered in the press by major publications like The New York Times and Vogue Business, among others.

=== Fatima's Great Outdoors ===
In 2021, Tariq published her debut children's book, Fatima's Great Outdoors, through Penguin Random House. The book tells the story of a young Muslim girl whose family goes on their very first camping trip after immigrating to the United States from India. It received positive reviews from publications like NPR's Short Wave, Sierra Club, and Kirkus Reviews.
