= Sibley Mill =

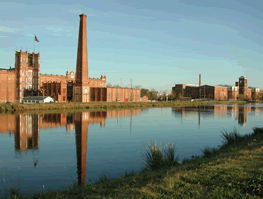
- Sibley Mill (building to left) ca. 2000
- Interactive map of the Sibley Mill area

General information
- Type: Cotton Mill
- Architectural style: Ornate Eclectic
- Location: 1717 Goodrich Street, Augusta, Georgia
- Coordinates: 33.487277°N 81.991975°W
- Current tenants: Cape Augusta, Corsica Technologies, Cyberworks Academy, M Communications
- Construction started: June 1880
- Completed: February 1882 (HAER GA-19,1)
- Owner: Augusta Canal Authority

Height
- Height: 110 feet (34 m) to top of bell towers (HAER GA-19 Sheet 4)

Technical details
- Size: 76 feet (23 m) wide, 528 feet (161 m) long
- Floor count: Four
- Floor area: Main building 160,000 square feet (15,000 m^{2})

Design and construction
- Architect: Jones S. Davis

References
- Historic American Engineering Record GA-19, 1977

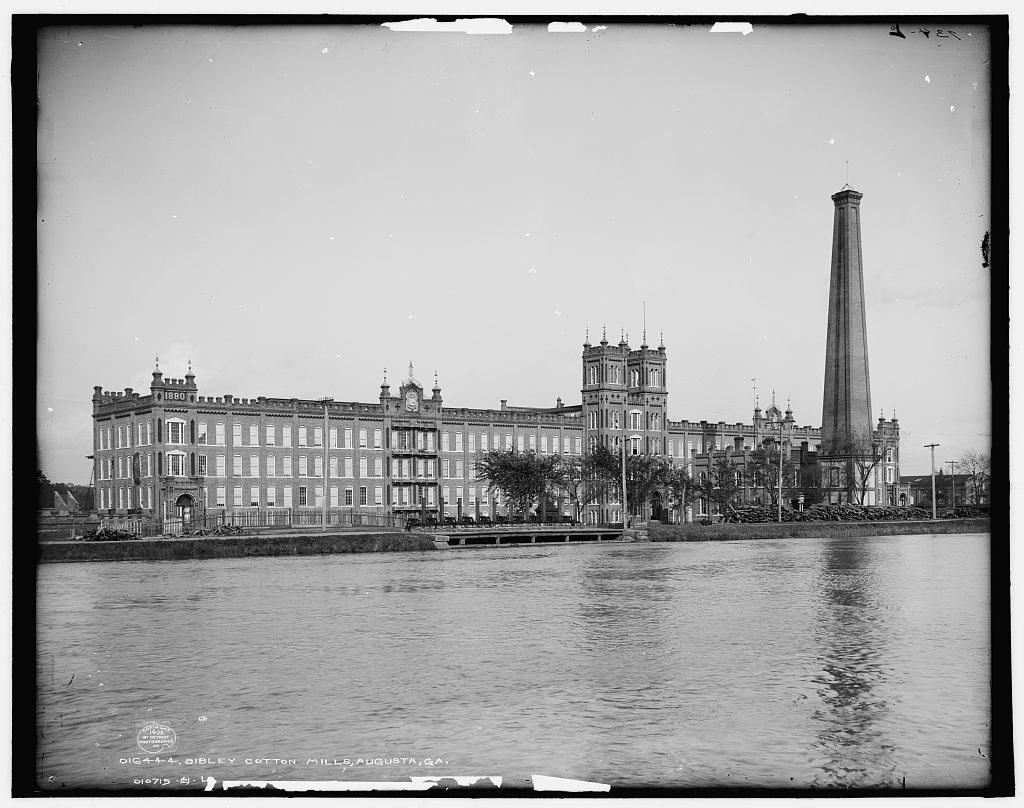
Sibley Mill ca. 1903

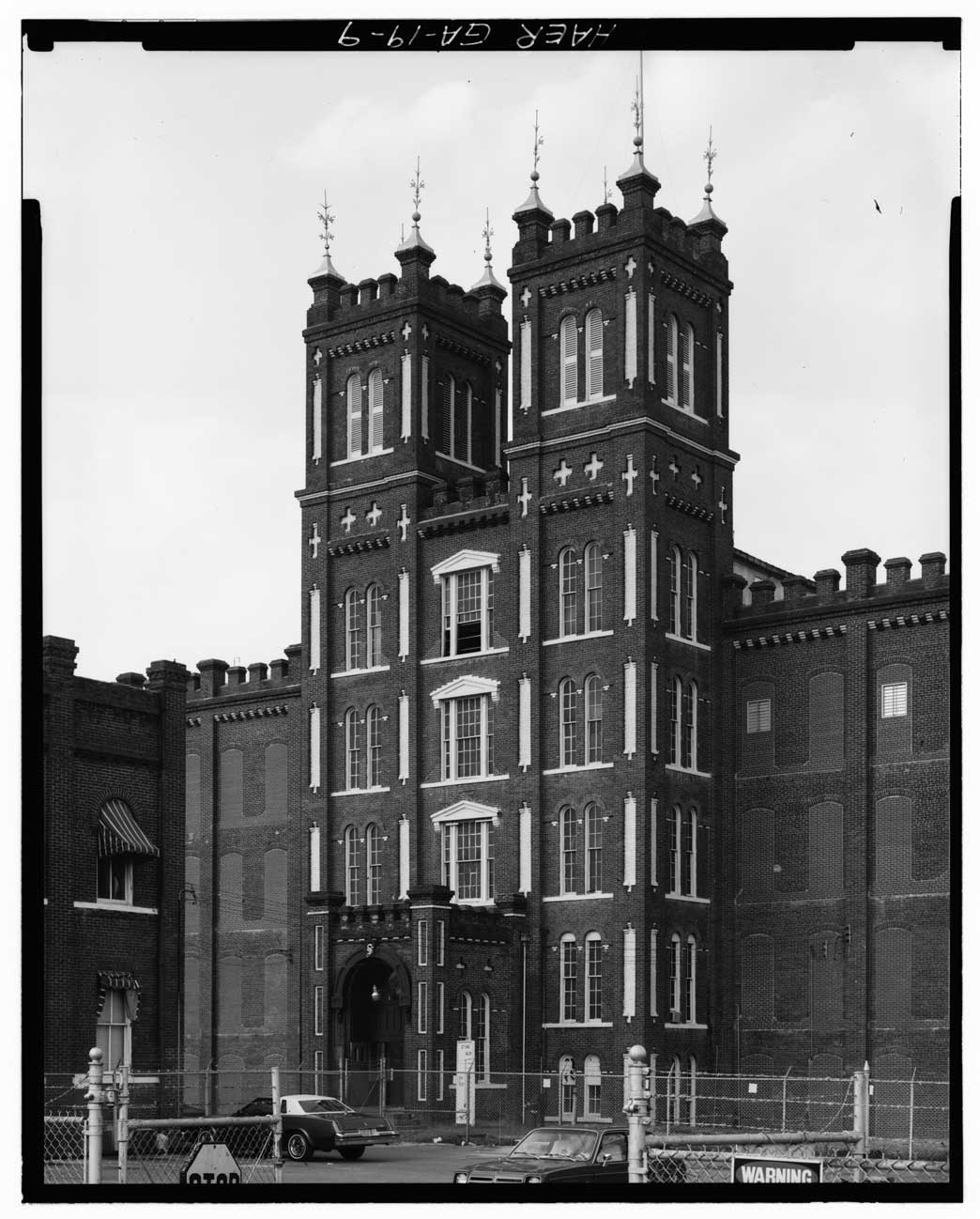
Sibley Mill bell towers ca. 1977

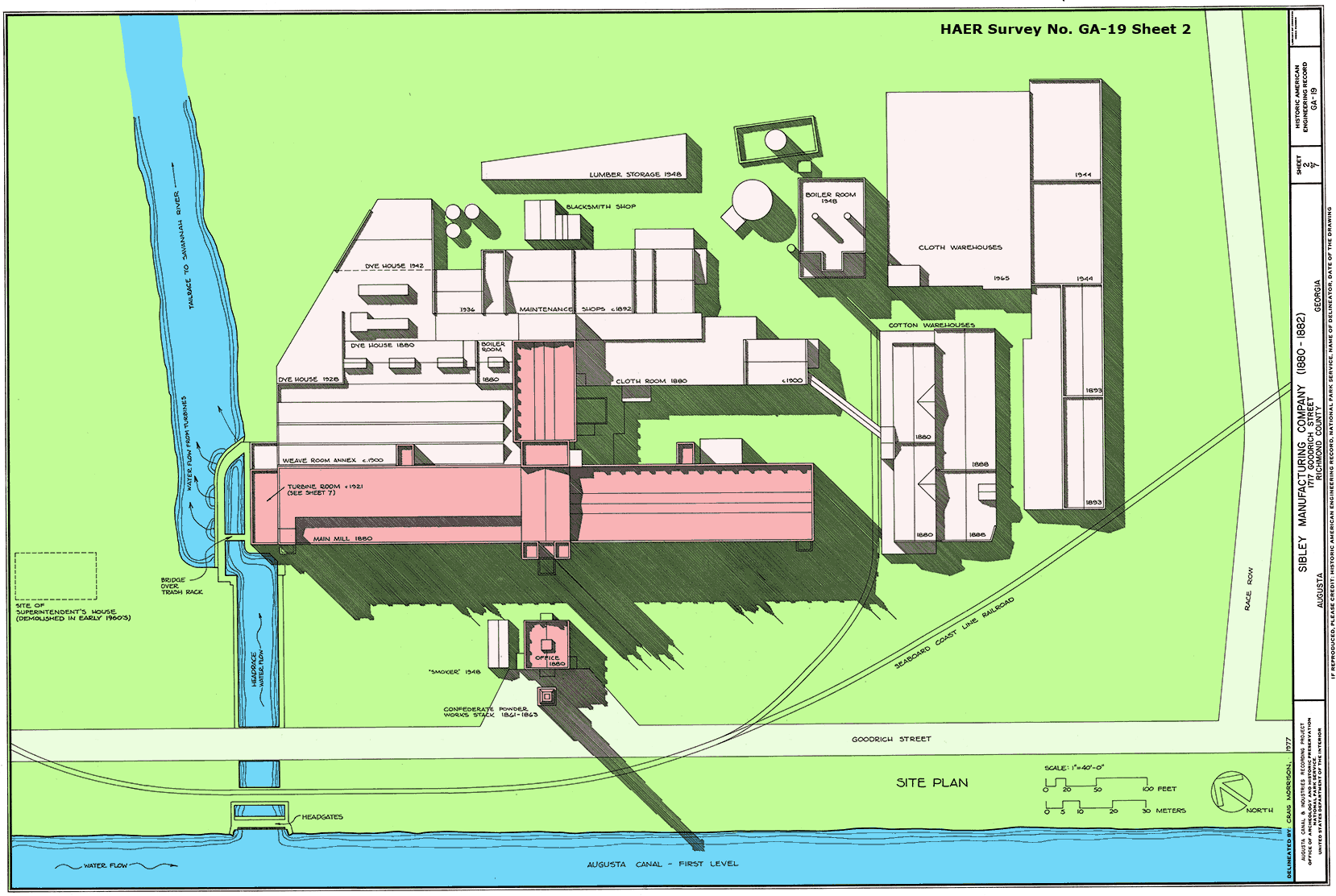
Sibley Mill site plan

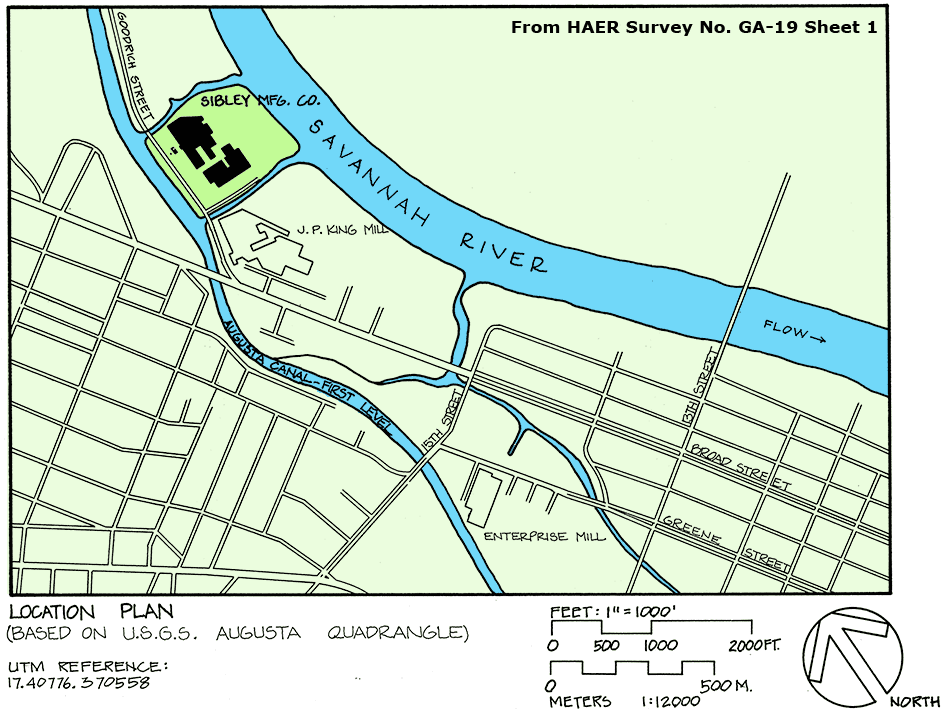
Sibley Mill location just upstream of downtown Augusta

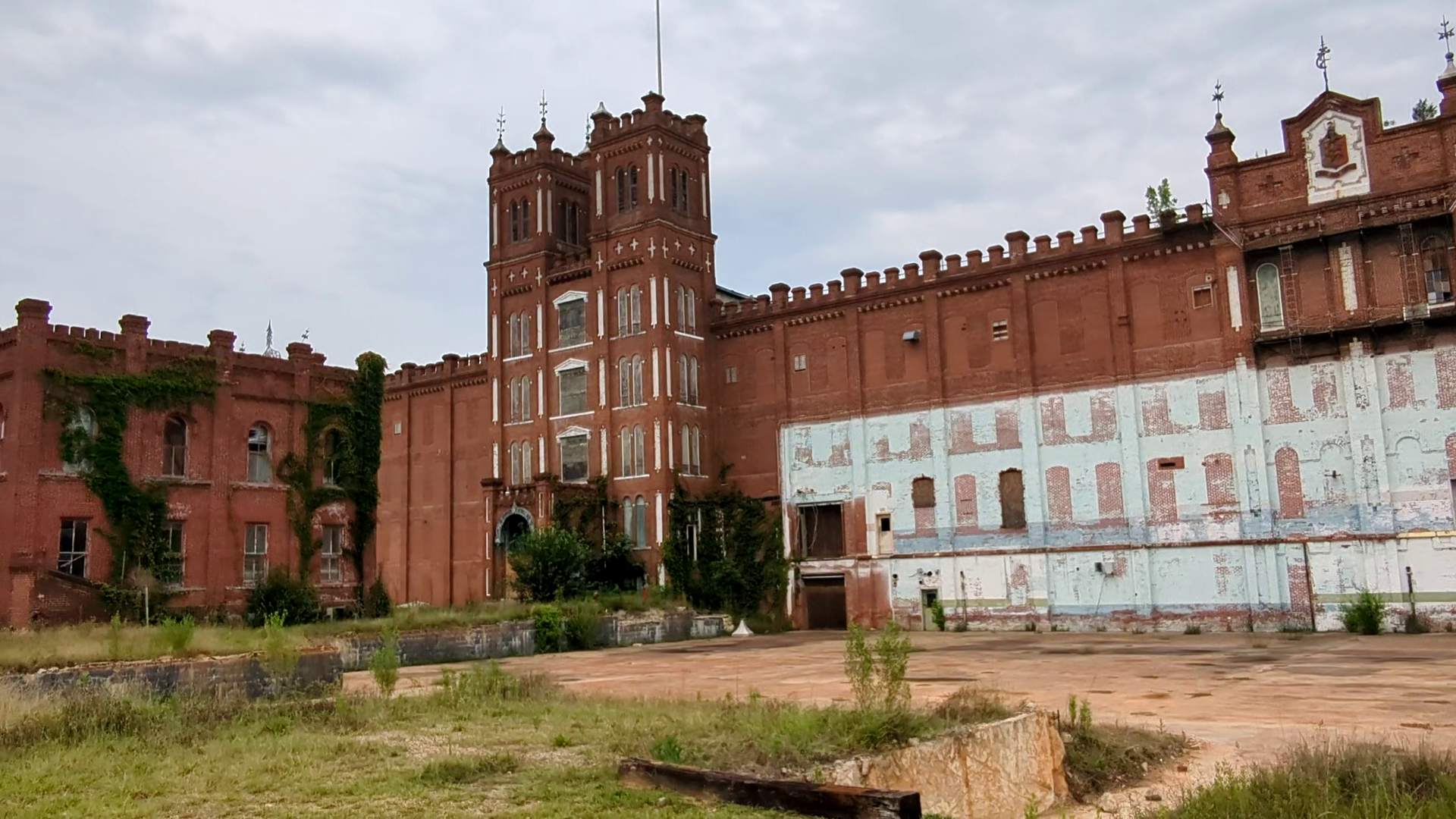
Sibley Mill building, May 2023

The Sibley Mill is a historic building located on the Augusta Canal at 1717 Goodrich Street near downtown Augusta, Georgia, United States. Designed by Jones S. Davis, it was built on a site previously occupied by the Confederate Powderworks, and was completed in 1882. While the interior is typical of any textile mill of the period, its imposing exterior is notable for an ornate style variously described as eclectic and neo-gothic. Textile products were produced there until 2006, since when the building has been unoccupied. The mill was built to operate on hydropower, and continues to generate electricity today.

== Construction ==
The Augusta Canal was greatly enlarged in 1875 in order to promote industrial development (Cashin, 136-144). After the successful opening of the Enterprise Mill in 1878, the Sibley Manufacturing Company was chartered in 1880. Jones S. Davis, the superintendent and architect of the Enterprise, was hired to organize the new mill. He soon produced drawings of a 528-foot-long (161 m), three-story, 24,000-spindle factory with highly ornamental architecture. Funding was raised from investors in Augusta, Savannah, Charleston, New York, and Cincinnati, Ohio (HAER, 2).

Named after the cotton broker, businessman, and civic leader Josiah Sibley, the mill was located at the former site of the Confederate Powderworks refinery building. Half a million bricks from the old Powderworks were bought for the new project at the price of five dollars per thousand, and the Augusta City Council allowed a capacity of up to 2,000 horsepower at an annual water rate of $5.50 per horsepower.

Josiah's son, William Crapon Sibley, was elected President of the new company, and construction began around June 1, 1880, with Jones S. Davis as supervisor (HAER, 3). A fourth story was added during construction, which along with other changes raised the cost estimate from $730,313.08 to $788,452.82. William Sibley's daughter Pearl, who had laid the "corner brick" during a ceremony on 13 October 1880, also laid the last brick January 27, 1882. Water was let into the wheel pit during a grand opening celebration held on 22 February 1882 (HAER, 4). In April, 1882, capital stock was raised to $1,000,000 to cover the finished cost, including 30 tenements for mill workers (HAER, 7).

The mill was originally built to run on hydropower, transmitted from water turbines throughout the building by mechanical shafting. The wheel pit was large enough to accommodate twice the capacity required to run the mill. In 1977, three water driven generators were observed with a combined capacity of 2625 kVA (HAER, 6-7).

== Architecture ==
The elaborately decorated exterior of the four-story building has been described as 'eclectic' and 'neo-gothic'. Two towers, one containing the bell and the other a water tank, form the central feature. The center of each wing is ornamented by a colorful cast iron coat of arms of the Sibley Family which includes the saying, Esse quam videri, meaning "To be, rather than just seem" (Sibley 1908, 33). Tall iron finials crown each of these features. The entire roof line is attractively crenelated, as is the office building in front.

The tall chimney in front is a relic of the Confederate Powderworks and has no manufacturing function. It is not known why so much effort was put into appearance, and the King Mill which followed shortly is quite austere. The interior is typical of any other textile mill of the period (HAER, 8).

== Business History ==
The mill opened with disappointing results in a time of overcapacity, nevertheless in 1884 additional machinery was purchased to bring the complement to 35,136 spindles and 672 looms. Automatic sprinklers were installed after a fire and consequent two-month shutdown to repair damage. More machinery and higher demand increased the mill's cotton consumption from 2,153,747 pounds (976,923 kg) in 1883 to 8,547,016 pounds (3,876,861 kg) in 1894. In 1895, machinery was further increased to 40,250 spindles and 1,109 looms. The mill came to be regarded as a well managed and profitable operation, and its reputation was enhanced by its physical appearance (HAER, 5).

The mill's sound management broke down after the retirement of William C. Sibley in 1896. Sales fell below capacity in 1911. An attempt to recruit immigrant labor from the north failed, as most of these workers left after only a few days. In 1914 the mill was criticised for lack of reinvestment in new machinery. The mill's status in the community declined as the city tried to reposition its image from "the Lowell of the South" to "the Garden City of the South" in order to attract northern winter tourists (HAER, 10).

In 1921 controlling interest was sold to the Graniteville Company, and by 1940 Graniteville had completely absorbed both the Sibley and the Enterprise mills. The last seven company-owned dwellings were sold in 1969 (HAER, 8). Graniteville Company was purchased in turn by Avondale Mills in 1996 (need citation).

== Closure ==
When observed in 1977, the mill manufactured denim for Levi-Strauss, using 32,700 spindles and 634 looms to produce 22 million pounds of product per year (HAER, 11). In 1999, carding and spinning operations were discontinued (The Augusta Chronicle, 3 September 1999). Denim finishing continued until 2006, when the mill shuttered completely and all processing equipment was removed. Pressure from foreign competition was cited as a cause, as well as the 2005 Graniteville train derailment disaster which damaged upstream processing in Aiken County, South Carolina (Augusta Chronicle, 30 June 2006).

== New Purpose ==
In 2010 the idle Sibley Mill was purchased by the Augusta Canal Authority, which continued to operate the hydropower unit (Augusta Chronicle, 31 August 2010). The Authority marketed the site for redevelopment, and in conjunction with environmental testing and remediation of the grounds, obtained approval for the site under the Brownfield Program pursuant to Georgia's Hazardous Site Reuse and Redevelopment Act (The Augusta Chronicle, 10 September 2010 and 23 February 2010). In 2011 a 77,000-square-foot (7,200 m^{2}) Kroc Center was completed directly across the Augusta Canal, with architectural elements complementing the Sibley Mill (Augusta Kroc Center web site ... About Us).

On May 4, 2016 The Augusta Canal Authority announced a 75-year lease of Sibley Mill to Cape Augusta, LLC. Cape Augusta is in the process of developing a commercial and residential mixed-use development. Current tenants include Cape Augusta, LLC, Corsica Technologies, Cyberworks Academy, and M Communications. Planned future development of a hotel at Sibley Mill is currently under consideration. In 2018 Cape Augusta expanded its development project with the purchase of the adjacent King Mill. Cape Augusta has announced an apartment development of over 250 units to begin at King Mill in 2020. The Canal Authority will continue to own and operate the hydropower plants at both King and Sibley Mills, providing Cape Augusta with electricity and water to power and cool electronic equipment.
