= Jennie Lasby Tessmann =

American researcher

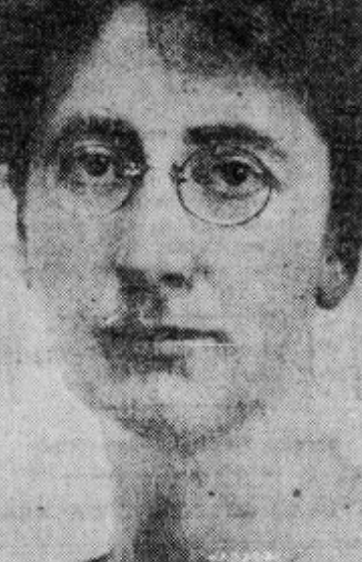
- Jennie B. Lasby, from a 1921 newspaper.
- Born: Jennie Belle Lasby; August 23, 1882; Castle Rock, Minnesota
- Died: December 9, 1959 (aged 77); Santa Ana, California
- Resting place: Fairhaven Memorial Park
- Other name: Jennie Lasby Tessman
- Education: Carleton College (BA); Mount Holyoke College (MA)
- Scientific career
- Fields: Astronomy
- Workplaces: Mount Wilson Observatory; Goodsell Observatory; Santa Ana Junior College

Jennie Belle Lasby Tessmann (August 23, 1882 – December 9, 1959) was an American spectroscopist and college educator. She was a "human computer" at Mount Wilson Observatory from 1906 to 1913. She taught astronomy and history at Santa Ana College from 1919 to 1946.

== Early life ==
Jennie Belle Lasby was born in Castle Rock, Minnesota, the daughter of Walter Lasby and Lavinia C. Freeman Lasby. Her father was born in Ontario, Canada, and her mother was from Wisconsin. She attended Carleton College, completing a bachelor's degree in 1904. She earned a master's degree in astronomy at Mount Holyoke College in 1906.

== Career ==
Lasby taught astronomy and mathematics at Mount Holyoke College during her graduate studies there. She was hired as a computer at Mount Wilson Observatory in 1906. She was among the first women research assistants at Mount Wilson, starting a few months before Cora G. Burwell joined the same department. In 1910, she attended the fourth conference of the International Union for Cooperation in Solar Research, when it was held at Mount Wilson. She left Mount Wilson in 1913, after co-authoring several scientific publications, including a monograph with Walter Sydney Adams. She became a member of the National Association for the Advancement of Science in 1921.

In 1914, Lasby went to work on a spectroscopy project in Germany, but she returned the following year with the start of World War I. She worked briefly at Goodsell Observatory in Minnesota, and was a librarian at Northfield, Minnesota.

From 1919 to 1946, Lasby Tessmann taught history and astronomy at Santa Ana Junior College. She helped develop the Bishop Observatory in Orange County as a teaching facility. She spoke to community groups often, and was president of the City Teachers' League and the Business and Professional Women's Club, both in Santa Ana.

== Personal life ==
Jennie Lasby married German scientist Heinrich Arnold Johannes (John) Tessmann in 1927, in Travemünde, Germany. She died in 1959, in Santa Ana, aged 77 years. In 1967, Tessmann Planetarium at Santa Ana College was named in her memory, and the Jennie Lasby Tessmann House is on the Santa Ana Register of Historic Properties.
