= French ship Iéna =

List of ships with the same or similar names

Four ships of the French Navy have borne the name Iéna in honour of the Battle of Jena-Auerstedt:

- Iéna was a 20-gun privateer corvette launched in 1807 as Revenant, renamed Iéna in 1808 but captured by the British that year and renamed HMS Victor.
- French brig Iéna (1810), a brig.
- French ship Iéna (1814), a 110-gun ship of the line launched in 1814, struck in 1864 and hulked until 1915.
- French battleship Iéna, launched in 1898, wrecked by internal explosions in 1907 and sold for scrap in 1912.
