= Frank Tremar Sibly Menendez =

British World War I flying ace

- Born: 26 January 1896; Nassau, Bahamas, British West Indies
- Died: 27 February 1973 (aged 77); Eastbourne, Sussex, England
- Military career
- Allegiance: United Kingdom
- Branch: British Army; Royal Air Force
- Service years: 1914–1919
- Rank: Lieutenant
- Units: York and Lancaster Regiment; Gloucestershire Regiment; No. 57 Squadron RFC
- Conflicts: World War I; Western Front
- Awards: Military Cross
- Other work: Civil Servant

Lt. Frank Tremar Sibly Menendez (26 January 1896 – 27 February 1973) was a British World War I flying ace credited with six aerial victories.

== Early life and education ==
Menendez was the only son of the Hon. F. M. Menendez, of Nassau, Bahamas and his wife Maud (née Sibly).

Menendez's uncle, his mother's brother, G. W. Sibly, was the founder of Wycliffe College, Gloucestershire.

Menendez attended his uncle's school from 1909 to 1912, before going up to St John's College, Cambridge, to study law.

== Military service ==
In 1914, Menendez abandoned his studies to enlist in the Army. He was commissioned as temporary second lieutenant on 19 March 1915, serving in the York and Lancaster Regiment, until transferring to the Gloucestershire Regiment on 10 September 1915.

Menendez was sent to France on 1 January 1916, and was promoted to lieutenant on 20 April. He was appointed an acting-captain while serving as a company commander from 29 July to 17 December 1916, during the Battle of the Somme. He also distinguished himself by leading trench raids at Neuve-Chapelle.

On 11 August 1917, he was appointed a flying officer (observer), and transferred to General List of the Royal Flying Corps, with seniority from 28 May. He was posted to No. 57 Squadron, flying the Airco D.H.4 two-seater day bomber.

Paired with Australian pilot Second Lieutenant Arthur Thomas Drinkwater, Menendez registered his first aerial victory on 18 August by driving down an Albatros D.V out of control over Courtrai, repeating the feat two days later over Houthulst Forest. On 21 September he accounted for two more D.Vs, one destroyed and the other driven down, over Dadizeele. He gained another double victory on 12 November, driving down two D.Vs south-east of Houthulst.

Menendez returned to England for flight training, being re-graded from observer to pilot on 30 May 1918. However, on 1 August, he was involved in a mid-air collision over Ipswich.

He survived, but was seriously injured, losing one eye and requiring facial reconstruction. On 5 June 1919 he relinquished his RAF commission on account of his injuries, but was permitted to retain his rank.

== Military Cross ==
On 27 October 1917 Menendez was awarded the Military Cross, which was gazetted on 15 March 1918.

The citation read:

Temporary Lieutenant Frank Tremar Silby Menendez, General List and Royal Flying Corps.

"For conspicuous gallantry and devotion to duty in carrying out photographic reconnaissances and bombing raids far behind the enemy lines. On one occasion, when attacked by five enemy scouts, he drove three of them down and the other two then withdrew. On two other occasions he has driven down enemy machines out of control."

== Later career ==
After spending some time recuperating in the Bahamas, Menendez married, and had two children.

In August 1927 he joined the Civil Service, serving in the Department of Overseas Trade. During World War II he served as a Lewis gunner in the Home Guard, and was also seconded to the Ministry of Economic Warfare.

== Death ==
Menendez died in a nursing home in Eastbourne, Sussex, on 27 February 1973.

== Bibliography ==
- Franks, Norman; Guest, Russell; Alegi, Gregory (2008). Above The War Fronts: A Complete Record of the British Two-seater Bomber Pilot and Observer Aces, the British Two-seater Fighter Observer Aces, and the Belgian, Italian, Austro-Hungarian and Russian Fighter Aces, 1914–1918. Grub Street Publishing. ISBN 1898697566, ISBN 978-1898697565
