= Jen =

Jen is a feminine given name, frequently a shortened form (hypocorism) of Jennifer, and occasionally a surname. It may refer to:

== Given name ==
=== People ===
- Jen Adams (born 1979), Australian lacrosse coach and former player
- Jen Bartel, American illustrator and comic artist
- Jen Buczkowski (born 1985), American former soccer player
- Jen Button (born 1977), Canadian former swimmer
- Jen DeNike (born 1971), American video and performance artist
- Jen Green (born 1955), British non-fiction author
- Jen Hadfield (born 1978), English poet
- Jen Hamilton, American nurse, author, and social media personality
- Jen Hoy (born 1991), American soccer player
- Jen Hudak (born 1986), American freestyle skier
- Jen Jacobs (1956–2016), Australian cricketer
- Jen Kirkman, American stand-up comedian, screenwriter and actress
- Jen Lancaster (born 1967), American author
- Jen Ledger (born 1989), English musician
- Jen Mazzocco (born 1984), American politician
- Jen Miller (born 1972), American actress, writer, painter, director, preacher and poet
- Jen O'Malley Dillon (born 1976), American political strategist
- Jen Pawol (born 1976), American woman baseball umpire
- Jen Powley (1977–2023), Canadian writer and disability advocate
- Jen Psaki (born 1978), American government official and television host
- Jen Schoullis (born 1989), American ice hockey player
- Jen Sincero (born 1965), American writer
- Jen Sorensen (born 1974), American cartoonist and illustrator
- Jen Strebs, American politician
- Jen Taylor (born 1973), American actress
- Jenn Baxter (born 1987), Canadian curler

=== Fictional characters ===
- Jen (Gelfling), the protagonist of the film The Dark Crystal
- Jen Handley, in the Australian soap opera Neighbours
- Jen Lindley, in the American television series Dawson's Creek
- Jennifer Rappaport, the American soap opera One Life to Live
- Jen Scotts, the Pink Ranger on Power Rangers Time Force
- Jen Barber, a character in the British television show The IT Crowd
- Jen, a contestant on Total Drama Presents: The Ridonculous Race

== Surname ==
- Gish Jen (born 1955), American writer
- Lisa Jên, Welsh actress and singer
- Ruth Jên (born 1964), Welsh artist
- Richie Jen (born 1966), Taiwanese singer and actor
- Selina Jen (born 1981), a member of the Taiwanese girl group S.H.E.
- Ren (surname) (Jen 任 in Wade–Giles)

== See also ==
- Jenn
- Jennifer (given name)
- Jenny (given name)
