= Jenny Mastoraki =

Greek poet and translator (1949–2024)

- Born: 21 February 1949; Zografou, Athens, Greece
- Died: 30 July 2024 (aged 75); Athens, Greece
- Resting place: Zografou Cemetery, Athens
- Occupations: Poet, translator
- Relatives: Nico Mastorakis (brother)
- Writing career
- Period: 1972–1989
- Website: Official Site

Jenny Mastoraki (Greek: Τζένη Μαστοράκη (1949 – 2024) was a Greek poet.

== Biography ==
Born in Athens, 1949. Studied Byzantine and Medieval Literature (National and Kapodistrian University of Athens, 1967-1972) and emerged as a leading figure of the Genia tou '70—a literary generation shaped by the final years of the Greek military dictatorship (1967–1974) and the early period of Metapolitefsi.

First appeared in the Anti-Anthology of Dimitris Iatropoulos (1971), with a collection of poems called The Synaxarion of St. Youth.

She published four books of poetry, and belonged to the Genia tou 70, a group of Greek authors who began publishing their work during the 1970s, especially towards the end of the Greek military junta of 1967–1974 and at the first years of the Metapolitefsi. She also translated works from English- and German-language authors into Greek.

She has received three prizes for translation. The Thornton Niven Wilder Prize in 1989 (Columbia University, Translation Center), the IBBY Prize (International Board on Books for Young People) for C.S. Lewis’ The Voyage of the Dawn Treader in 1992, and the Hellenic Theatre Museum Prize, for Howard Barker's The Dying of Today, in 2011.

In 2020 Mastoraki received the «National Literary Award».

Mastoraki died in Athens on 30 July 2024, at the age of 75.

== Poetry ==
- Διόδια (Tolls), 1972
- Το σόι (The kin), 1978
- Ιστορίες για τα βαθιά (Tales of the deep), 1983
- Μ' ένα στεφάνι φως (With a garland of light), 1989

== Selected translations ==
- Salinger, J. D., Ο φύλακας στη σίκαλη (The Catcher in the Rye), 1978
- McCullers, Carson, Πρόσκληση σε γάμο (The Member of the Wedding), 1981
- Canetti, Elias, Η τύφλωση (Die Blendung), 1985
- Böll, Heinrich, Οι απόψεις ενός κλόουν (Ansichten eines Clowns), 1986
- Highet, Gilbert, Η κλασική παράδοση (The Classical Tradition), 1988
- Poe, Edgar Allan, Λιγεία (Ligeia), 1991
- Lewis, Clive Staples, Το άλογο και το αγόρι του (The horse and the boy), 1994
- Kleist, Heinrich von, Οι μαριονέτες (Marionettes), 1996
- Lewis, Clive Staples, Το λιοντάρι, η μάγισσα και η ντουλάπα (The lion, the witch and the wardrobe), 1999
- Kane, Sarah, Καθαροί, πια (Cleansed), 2001
- Kane, Sarah, Λαχταρώ, 2003
- Marx, Karl, Εγκώμιο του εγκλήματος, (Praise of murder), 2005
- Machiavelli, Niccolo, Ο μανδραγόρας, 2008
