= Jennie Hart Sibley =

American temperance leader (1846–1917)

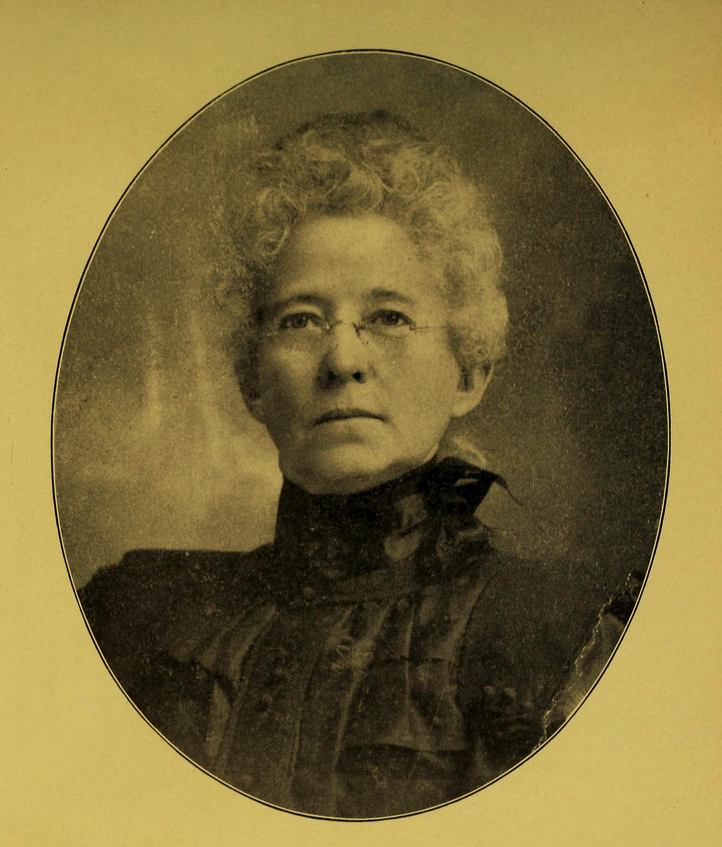
- Born: Sarah Virginia Hart; October 21, 1846; Augusta, Georgia, U.S.
- Died: June 18/19, 1917; Union Point, Georgia, U.S.
- Other names: Jennie
- Occupation: temperance activist
- Known for: President, Georgia State W.C.T.U.; President, U.D.C.; President, Union Point Garden Club

Jennie Hart Sibley (1846–1917) was a prominent figure in the state of Georgia, holding leadership roles within various organizations, particularly in the American temperance movement. She served as the second president of the Georgia State Woman's Christian Temperance Union (W.C.T.U.), succeeding her sister-in-law, Jane E. Sibley. She was also Greene County's president of the Daughters of the Confederacy as well as the inaugural president of the Union Point Garden Club, sometimes referred to as "The Mother of Georgia garden clubs". Sibley is also remembered for her advocacy in the suffrage movement.

== Biography ==
Sarah Virginia (nickname, "Jennie") Hart was born at Augusta, Georgia, October 21, 1846. She was a descendant of two families of South Carolina and Virginia. The mother, Maria Virginia (Collier) Hart (1818–1890), organized the first Sunday school in Greene County, Georgia in 1841 and personally conducted it for a long time. At the close of the civil war, the father, William Thomas Hart (1840–1901), established a wayside home at Union Point, Georgia where over 50,000 meals were freely served to hungry soldiers of both the Confederate States Army and Union Army. Jennie's siblings were William, James, John, and Mary. John served as Attorney General of Georgia.

She received her education in her home city before graduating from the Lucy Cobb Institute in Athens, Georgia.

In Richmond County, Georgia, on November 15, 1865, she married Samuel Hale Sibley (1823–1883), of Augusta. They had six children: Josiah, Grace, Jennie, Catherine, Samuel, and James.

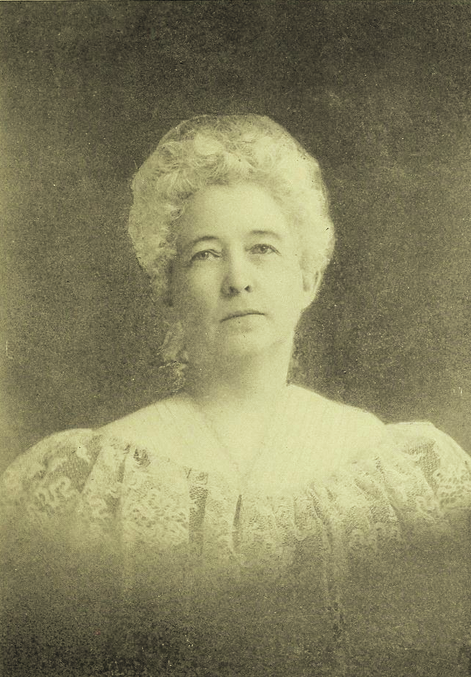
(1914)

She was president since 1888 of the W.C.T.U. of the eighth congressional district, comprising twelve counties in Georgia. For several years, she was state superintendent of the department of scientific temperance instruction and also superintendent of the state Young W.C.T.U.. She was a delegate to the World's W.C.T.U. convention held in London in 1896, and several times was elected a delegate to National W.C.T.U. conventions. In 1900, Sibley succeeded her sister, Jane Sibley, as president of the Georgia State W.C.T.U. In 1916, she was made honorary president of the State W.C.T.U.

The governor appointed her one of the board of lady visitors to the Georgia Normal and Industrial College (now Georgia College & State University), an institution in which she manifested a great interest.

Sibley served as Greene County's president of the Daughters of the Confederacy. She was the first president of the Union Point Garden Club.

A large landowner, Sibley worked for the enfranchisement of women. She stated: "I am tired and sick of paying my taxes and then have to get on my knees and beg some man that does not own one foot of land, and pays no tax, save a poll tax, to do something for me and the homes of this land."

Jennie Hart Sibley died at Union Point, June 18/19, 1917.
