= Jenn Vix =

American songwriter

Jenn Vix is an American solo electronic-rock singer, songwriter, producer, and recording engineer.

== Jenn Vix ==
Vix's first solo release was Jenn Vix, which was officially released in January 1995. Rolling Stone gave the album 3.5 stars.

== Singles ==
In June 2015, Vix released a single track collaboration with Andy Anderson named "Eyes Roll Back".

Vix then released a double track titled "F*ck, Rinse, Repeat" and "Burn."

Vix‘s next release was a single track titled "I Don't Trust You".
