= Bethesda Declaration =

Open letter written by American scientists

The Bethesda Declaration is a letter written and signed on June 9, 2025, by close to 500 employees and staff members of the United States National Institutes of Health (NIH), including some anonymous signatures. The letter requests the restoration of cancelled grants, focusing on "life-saving science" and grants "delayed or terminated for political reasons".

== Background ==
The NIH is the world's largest public funder of biomedical research. It has a budget of $48 billion. In 2024, every $1 in NIH funding generated $2.56 in economic activity, and NIH funding supported over 400,000 jobs.

In the days after the second Trump administration took office, the Department of Health and Human Services (HHS)—the parent organization of the NIH—cancelled NIH meetings and travel for over a week as part of a reorganization, preventing the agency from issuing research grants and in effect freezing 80% of its budget. An NIH spokesperson said the pause included "mass communications and public appearances that are not directly related to emergencies or critical to preserving health," and was meant to "allow the new team to set up a process for review and prioritization." Researchers speaking to Nature said this was the first time such a suspension had lasted for more than a day.

According to The Economist:

Many institutions routinely use NIH funds to cover between 50% and 70% of their “indirect” costs, which includes things such as laboratory maintenance, equipment provision and salaries for support and administrative staff. The administration sees that share as too high, and wants to cap indirect costs at 15% of the grant total, in line with similar limits set by private organisations, forcing institutions to pay for the remainder themselves ... The growth of indirect costs was highlighted by the Government Accountability Office during Barack Obama’s presidency, leading the administration to consider a cap of its own. But one of 15% is seen by many as too restrictive.

NIH implementation of a 15% cap on indirect cost funding was permanently blocked by a judge in April. The NIH planned to appeal.

The Association of American Medical Colleges (AAMC) reported that, by May 20, the NIH had cancelled $2.5 billion in grants to US institutions, including $1.4 billion to US medical schools and hospitals. 30% of cancelled funding supported active clinical trials. The report called the cancellations "unprecedented in the history of the agency."

== Letter ==
The letter mentions that $9.5 billion dollars in grants affecting around 2,100 projects have been cut, that $2.6 billion in contracts have been cut, and that there are plans to cut up to 40% of NIH's $48 billion budget in the future. The declaration raises concerns about reducing funding for indirect costs of research at universities, which were recently lowered to 15%. The letter mentions the inefficiency of cutting nearly complete projects and how that is actually wasting money rather than saving it. The declaration shares concerns about the firing of NIH staff. The declaration expresses concern that orders from Trump administration officials will lead to NIH not being able to spend its entire budget this year, and will be used as justification to cut the budget next fiscal year. The signatories mentioned that there is a "culture of fear and suppression" at NIH right now.

Some specific grants and contracts that were cancelled include drug-resistant tuberculosis research in Haiti. The abrupt manner in which the studies were terminated resulted in issues such as ending medication for patients early or leaving monitoring device implants in patients without removing them.

The letter was sent to NIH leader Jay Bhattacharya, the Department of Health and Human Services Secretary Robert F. Kennedy Jr., and members of Congress who provide oversight to NIH.

The letter mentions that it took inspiration from a different dissent letter, the Great Barrington Declaration, from 2020. This is not the only recent dissent action by employees of NIH; in May some staffers walked out of a town hall meeting where the agency's leader, Jay Bhattacharya, was speaking.

The declaration is named after the city of Bethesda, Maryland, which is the location of the NIH's headquarters. There were 92 full name signatures and 250 anonymous signatures. There were signatories from all 27 NIH institutes.

A second, similar letter was published on the website of Stand Up For Science. By July 2025 it had received more than 31,000 signatures, including 69 from Nobel Prize winners.
