= Journal of Cutaneous Medicine and Surgery =

Medical journal

- Discipline: Dermatology
- Language: English
- Edited by: Kirk Barber

Publication details
- History: 1996–present
- Publisher: SAGE Publications
- Frequency: Bimonthly
- Impact factor: 2.092 (2020)

Standard abbreviations
- ISO 4: J. Cutan. Med. Surg.

Indexing
- CODEN: JCMSFU
- ISSN: 1203-4754 (print); 1615-7109 (web)
- OCLC no.: 421856521

Links
- Journal homepage; Online access; Online archive

The Journal of Cutaneous Medicine and Surgery (abbreviated JCMS) is a bimonthly peer-reviewed medical journal covering dermatology. It was established in 1996 and is published by SAGE Publications in collaboration with the Canadian Dermatology Association, of which it is the official journal. The editor-in-chief is Kirk Barber (University of Calgary). According to the Journal Citation Reports, the journal has a 2020 impact factor of 2.092, ranking it 46th out of 69 journals in the category "Dermatology".
