= Mohammad Hadi Mofatteh =

Iranian-German Twelver Shia Muslim cleric

Hujjat al-Islam Mohammad Hadi Mofatteh
- محمدهادى مفتح
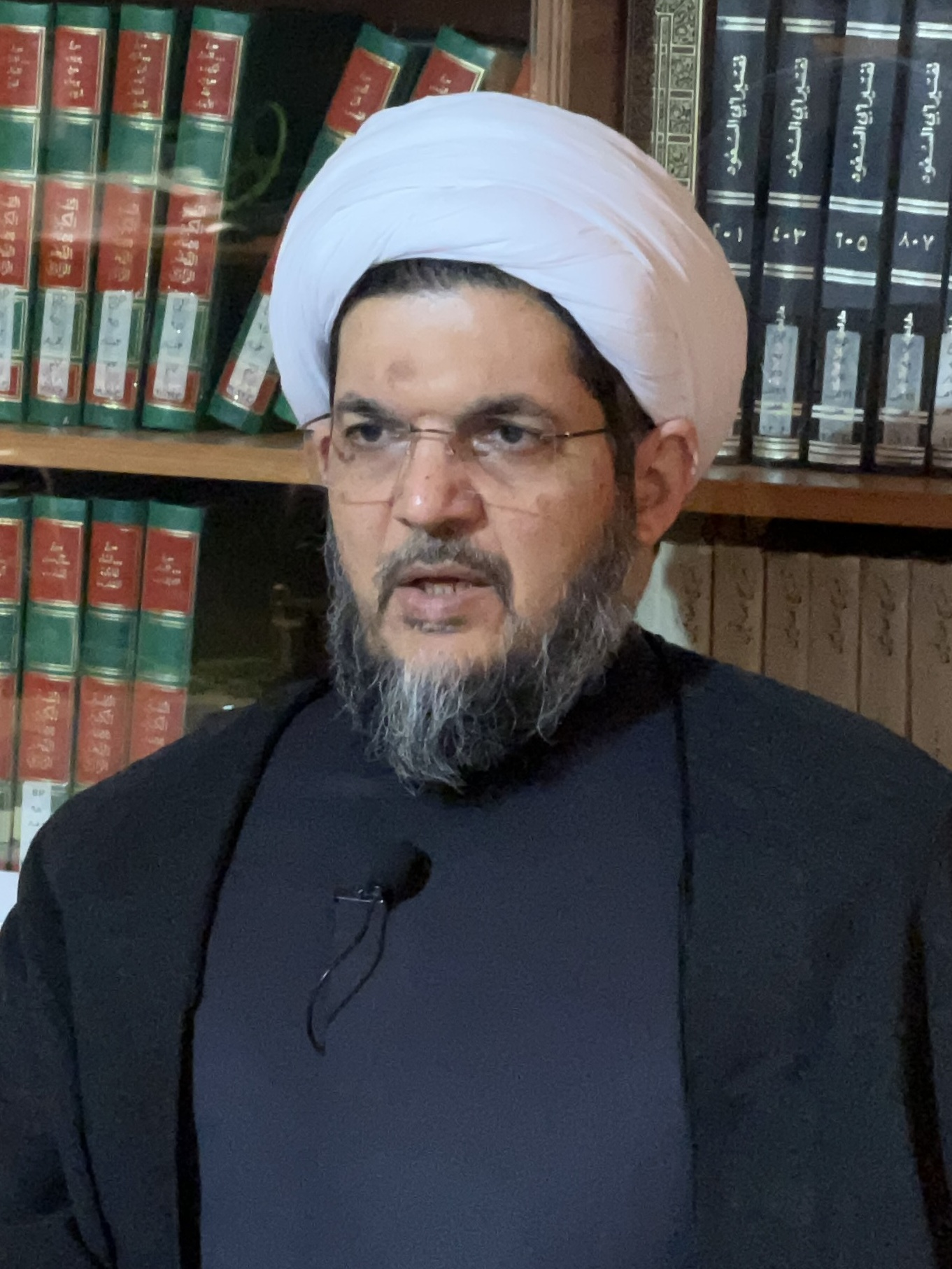
- Mofatteh in 2022

Personal life
- Born: Disputed; see § Early life Qom, Pahlavi Iran
- Parent: Mohammad Mofatteh

Religious life
- Religion: Shia Islam
- Sect: Twelver Shi'ism

Senior posting
- Based in: Qom, Hamburg
- Post: Islamic Centre Hamburg
- Period in office: 2018–2024
- Predecessor: Reza Ramezani Gilani
- Successor: Position abolished
- Reason for exit: Organisation banned

Mohammad Hadi Mofatteh (Persian: محمدهادى مفتح, born 1966 or 9 April 1967) is a Twelver Shia Muslim cleric. From September 2018 until July 2024, he was the head and director of the Islamic Centre Hamburg, the center of Shia Islam in Germany, which operated between 1965 until its banning in July 2024.

== Early life ==
Sources dispute Mohammad Hadi Mofatteh's birthdate and place. He was either born in 1966 in the Iranian city of Qom or on 9 April 1967 in Hamburg, West Germany. He is the son of Mohammad Mofatteh (born 1928), a religious scholar and professor at the University of Tehran. His father was assassinated by Forghan group in front of the building of Theology department of Tehran University in 1979.

== Studying and teaching ==
Mofatteh's primary education was undertaken in Tehran, and in 1984 received he received a diploma in mathematics. He studied electrical engineering at the University of Tehran, and later theology. After studying theology, he studied his master's program in the Quran and Hadith science at the Usul Al-Deen College of Qom from 1996 to 2000 his professors were Allameh Sayyed Murtaza Asgari and Ayatollah Mohammad Hadi Marefat, and studied in the period from 2003 to 2008 his Ph.D. in Quran and Hadith science at Usul Al-Deen College and his lecturers were Dr. Seyyed Mohammad Baqir Hojati and Ayatollah Marefat. he received his doctorate with the work Quran and Nahj al-Balagha on the realm of religious government and sovereignty right, a thesis on the derivation of theories of governance from the Quran and Nahj al-Balāgha. he teaches at the theological college of Qom.

He studied high school and college and attended courses in Tehran's seminary. His professors were Seyed Ali Hashemi Golpayegani, Seyyed Hassan Mostafavi, Sayyid Hossein Mostafavi, and Dr. Abolghasem Gorgi in the fields of Fiqh, principles of Islamic jurisprudence, and philosophy.

He studied in the Qom Seminary to complete the high-level courses and his professors were Sayyid Ali Mohaghegh Damad, Hasanzadeh Amoli, Hasan Ghadiri, Etemadi, Reza Ostadi, and Ali Mohammadi Khorasani. He studied lessons on jurisprudence and principles in Tehran's Seminary with the Great Ayatollahs Seyyed Ali Khamenei and Hajj Aqa Mojtaba Tehrani. After returning to Qom, he studied jurisprudence, the principles and philosophy of the Great Ayatollahs Fazel Lankarani, Shabiri Zanjani, Javadi Amoli, Vahid Khorasani, and Moemen Qomi.

He taught high levels in the Qom Seminary with several courses in jurisprudence and philosophy, and since the academic year of 2012 he has been teaching outside jurisprudence (highest level in jurisprudence) in the Qom Seminary.

Professor Mohammad Hadi Mofatteh has been promoted to Associate Professor of Quran and Hadith Science since October 2008 and in February 2014. In addition to teaching at this university, he also teaches at Qom Azad University, Religion and Theology faculty, Usul Al-Deen College, faculty of Quran and Hadith, Imam Khomeini Specialized University, Higher School of Interpretation, Quran University of Science and Education, and Farhangian University bachelor's degree, master's degree and doctorate degrees. So far, the guidance and consultant of the dissertations of Ph.D. and master's degrees have been numerous for him.

== Order to leave Germany ==
In August 2024, Mofatteh was ordered to leave Germany for acting as an agent of the Iranian government and promoting what German interior minister Nancy Faeser referred to as "an Islamist-extremist, totalitarian ideology". Mofatteh had previously been under surveillance by the Federal Office for the Protection of the Constitution, and the Islamic Centre Hamburg had been banned and its properties confiscated five weeks prior to Mofatteh being ordered to leave Germany. Expelled in Germany in September 2024.

== Positions ==
- Member of the Board of Directors and Technical Deputy Computer Research Center of Islamic Sciences (1992–1998)
- Founder and director of the National Maaref Radio Broadcasting Network (1998–1999)
- Secretary of the High Council for Religious Affairs of the Voice of the Islamic Republic of Iran (1999–2006)
- Director of the Islamic Economics Department at the Center for Islamic Studies of Iran's television (2004–2005)
- Director of the Department of Quran and Hadith Science of the University of Qom (2010–2012)
- Deputy of Education and Research of the Faculty of Theology and Islamic Education of Qom University (2012–2014)
- Board member of Islamic Azad University, Hamedan Province (2010–2016)
- representative of the Minister of Science in the Supervisory Board of Islamic Scholars of the University of Qom (2015–2018)
- member of the board of directors of the Qur'anic Studies Association of Qom (2015–2018)
- member of the elected council and research assistant of the Supreme Council of Qom Islamic Seminary (2016–2018).
- as the representative of the Shi'ite authority, took over the responsibility of the Islamic Center of Hamburg and the imamate of the Hamburg mosque in September 2018, at the age of 51.

== Publications ==
- three books of power theory derived from the Quran and tradition
- the study of the distortion of the Quran
- Orientalism or Islamophobia (2016).
- Mofatteh, Mohammad Hadi (2016). "The important and more important principle, and the unethical theory of justification". Ethical Research. 6 (3): 145.
- Mofatteh, Mohammad Hadi (2020). "Strategies of the Islamic Government in International Relations and of War and Peace". Journal of Islamic Government. 24 (2): 35–58.
- Mohammad, Hadi Mofatteh; Najafi, Mohammad Javad; Savoji, Mohammad Hassan Movahhedi (2018). "The Rights of Critics According to the Quran and International Law and the Laws of Iran". Journal of Comparative Law. 4 (2): 107.
- Mohammad, Hadi Mofatteh; Najafi, Mohammad Javad; Savoji, Mohammad Hassan Movahhedi (2016). "Right of Criticism from the Viewpoint of the Quran and the Sunnah". Journal of Qur'anic Studies, Nameh Jamia. 2 (3): 149.
- Mofatteh, Mohammad Hadi (2017). "An Islamic Perspective on the Characteristics and Criteria of Good Management". Religious Inquiries. 6 (12): 67–83.
- Mofatteh, Mohammad Hadi (2010). "PREEMPTIVE JIHAD IN THE QURAN AND SUNNAH". Mashreq-E Mouood. 8 (31): 131–153.
- a manifestation of the rule of law in the traditions of the Prophet
- the language of the Quran from the perspective of Ghazali
- the extent of government interference And jurisprudence from the point of view of the Quran and Nahj al-Balaghah
- Mofatteh, Mohammad Hadi; Maleki, Zeynab Musavi (2016). "Free Will in Particles from the Perspective of the Quran and Quantum Physics". Journal of Qur'anic Studies. 12 (116): 55.
- the place of rational reason in the principles of Shia and Sunni jurisprudence
- the verses of the Hajj with an adaptive approach
- the lifestyle of the underlying managers
- privacy; Social ethics
- social activity of women in the opinions of Shia and Sunni commentators based on the verses of 33 surah al-Ahzab and 24 surah Nisa
- The scope of freedom of the artist in relation to the privacy of individuals and guilds
- Review of the judgment of Akhund Khorasani and Imam Khomeini regarding the validity of the narrations of Mustadrek al-Wasel
- Mohammad, Hadi Mofatteh; Najafi, Mohammad Javad; Savoji, Mohammad Hassan Movahhedi (2016). "Right of Criticism from the Viewpoint of the Quran and the Sunnah". Qur'an, Fiqh and Islamic Law Journal. 2 (3): 149.
- Mofatteh, Mohammad Hadi (2015). "THE HOLY PROPHET: POLITICAL AND MORAL VALUES". Religious Inquiries. 13 (2): 102–128.
- comparative interpretation; Analyzing the verse of Imamat in the interpretation of Sunni and Shia
- The Rule of Importance and the Unethical Theory of Justification
- The negotiation of Alast and the Criticism of the Commentator's Perspectives on the Verse of the Misagh
- The Critique of the Adoption of the Quran from the Literature of the Time, Analyzing the Viewpoint of Yousef Dareh Haddad
- The Imam Ali's Creation and Expansion of Consistency Society, relying on the role of the national media (2016); an interpretative survey on the halalness of marriage with the women of the book
- Assignment and analysis of economic corruption and its economic consequences in the Quran and Hadith
- Ethics in Politics, a Comparison between Machiavelli, Qur'an, and Ali
- The Relation of Family and Society in New Models of Communication from an Islamic Perspective
- The Relationship between Governmental Popularity and its Religious Legitimacy (August 2016); Transmitters of Hadith of Abu al-Qasim al-Khoei in General Reliability
- Mofatteh, Mohammad Hadi; Sajjad, Mohammadnam (2017). "An Exegetic Study of Lawfulness of taking Women of the Book in Mariage". Journal of the Holy Quran and Islamic Texts. 8 (30): 61.

== See also ==
- Islamic Centre Hamburg
- Mohammad Mofatteh
