= IHZ =

IHZ may refer to:

- IHZ, callsign of Italian cruiser Francesco Ferruccio
- Internationales Handelszentrum (international trade center), predecessor to the Interhotel Merkur, part of the architecture of Leipzig
- IHZ, abbreviation for Islamisches Zentrum Hamburg (Islamic Centre Hamburg), monitored by the State Office for the Protection of the Constitution of Hamburg
