= Attapur =

- Neighbourhood
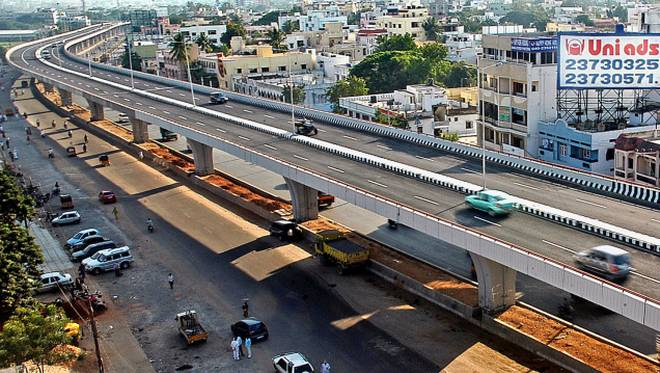
- PV Narasimha Rao Expressway

- Location in Hyderabad, India Attapur (India)
- Coordinates: 17.3959°N 78.4312°E
- Country: India
- State: Telangana
- District: Ranga Reddy District
- Metro: Hyderabad

Government
  - Body: GHMC
  - MP: G. Ranjith Reddy
  - MLA: T.Prakash Goud
  - Mayor: Gadwal Vijayalakshmi

Languages
  - Official: Telugu
- Time zone: UTC+5:30 (IST)
- PIN: 500048
- Telephone code: 91-, 040
- Vehicle registration: TG-07
- Lok Sabha constituency: Chevella (Lok Sabha constituency)
- Assembly constituency: Rajendranagar (Assembly constituency)
- Planning Agency: GHMC
- Police commissioner: Stephen Raveendra, IPS, Cyberabad Metropolitan Police
- Website: telangana.gov.in

Attapur is a commercial and residential area located in South western Hyderabad, Telangana.

It provides connectivity to the Rajiv Gandhi International Airport. The P.V. Narasimha Rao Expressway passes through Attapur. Being close to Mehdipatnam and Rajendranagar is an added advantage for Attapur.

The National Academy of Customs Indirect Taxes and Narcotics (NACIN) has its Zonal Training Institute at Attapur. The Rajendranagar Sub-Divisional Magistrate and Revenue division Office is located here. The XVI Additional Metropolitan Magistrate Court, Rajendranagar is near Attapur. The Attapur Regional Transport Office is one of the biggest in Hyderabad and covers many areas under its jurisdiction. It contains a multiplex Cinépolis. The Himayat Sagar reservoir is close to Attapur. The retailers Walmart and Metro Cash and Carry are near Attapur.

The 225-year-old Rambagh Ramalayam temple structure and premises were given the Indian National Trust for Art and Cultural Heritage(INTACH) Heritage award for 2015.

There is a Swayambhu Anantha Padmanabhaswamy Temple in Attapur. Sikh oldest Gurudwara of Hyderabad, Puratan Gurudwara Sahib Asha Singh Bagh, built in 1832 is also present near Attapur. Mushakmahal a 1681 built palace is also present in center of attapur.

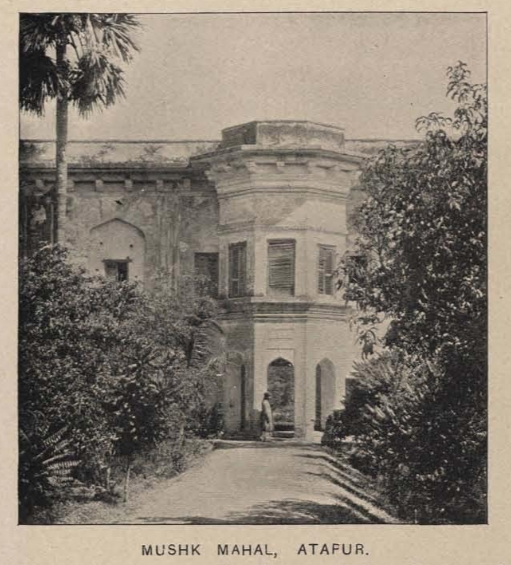
Mushk Mahal in Attapur, a historic 16th-century Qutb Shahi palace

P.V. Narasimha Rao Telangana Veterinary University, Sardar Vallabhbhai Patel National Police Academy, National Institute of Rural Development, National Institute of Agricultural Extension Management, National Academy of Agricultural Research Management, Professor Jayashankar Telangana State Agricultural University, Sri Konda Laxman Telangana State Horticultural University are close to Attapur. It also has a Ahl e Hadees Masjid behind hotel Swagat Grand. The Qutub Shahi Masjid of Attapur conducts lectures on Contemporary challenges and opportunities of Muslims of India. The Masjid e Quba conducts open Mosque day to invite non Muslims to Masjid as a part of communal harmony.

Zoi Hospitals, Germanten Hospital and Premier hospitals, Mythri Hospitals are available around this area.
