= Attempted assassination of Ali Khamenei =

Attempted assassination of Ali Khamenei may refer to:

- 1981 attempted assassination of Ali Khamenei
- Assassination of Ali Khamenei, the successful 2026 attempt
