= Reza Ramezani Gilani =

Iranian Ayatollah

Ayatollah Reza Ramezani Gilani
- رضا رمضانی گیلانی
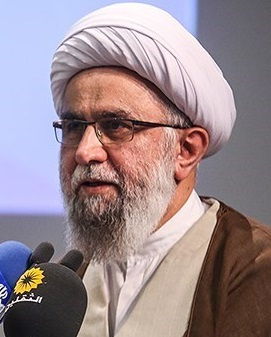

Personal life
- Born: 1963 (age 62–63) Rasht, Iran
- Occupation: Secretary-General of the Ahl Al-Bayt World Assembly.; representative of Gilan in the Assembly of Experts.; he represented the Supreme Leader and the Friday Imams in Karaj.; head and director of the Islamic Centre Hamburg.

Religious life
- Religion: Islam
- Creed: Twelver Shia

Reza Ramezani (Persian: رضا رمضانی گیلانی) (born 1963 in Rasht, Iran) is a Twelver Shia muslim cleric with the religious rank of Ayatollah. He has been a representative of Gilan in the Assembly of Experts since 2006. From 2009 to August 2018, he was head and director of the Islamic Center Hamburg, the center of Shiite Islam in Germany. Before working in Hamburg, he headed the Islamic Center Imam Ali Vienna. He is also the Secretary-General of the Ahl Al-Bayt World Assembly. Between 2001 and 2005, he represented the Supreme Leader and the Friday Imams in Karaj.

== Life and career ==
Ramezani studied at the theological faculty in Rasht, later in Mashhad. His teachers include the Ayatollahs.

In Qom he then studied Islamic Law and Postgraduate education (ijtihad) with the Ayatollah Mohammad Fazel Lankarani, Wahid Khorasani, Makarem shirazi, Ja'far Sobhani, Taqi Bahjat and Madadi Khorasani, furthermore the subjects exegesis, philosophy with the Ayatollah Hassanzadeh Amoli, Ansari Schirasi, Askari Gilani and Ahmad Beheschti. Thereafter, he completed his Doctorate.

"He taught subjects such as Arabic literature, logic, philosophy, Islamic theology, ethics, exegesis, Islamic jurisprudence and canonical foundations at theological faculties in Rasht, Mashhad, Qom and Karaj, in all, including the higher levels".

Ramezani is the author of numerous articles and writings.

== Literature ==
Al-Fadschr No. 136 (The new director of the Islamic Center Hamburg; PDF; 106 kB) Editor: Islamic Center Hamburg.

== See also ==
- Zaynolabideen Ghorbani
- Encyclopaedia of Islam
- Seyed Abbas Hosseini Ghammaghami
- Islamic Centre Hamburg
- List of ayatollahs
- List of members in the Fifth Term of the Council of Experts

== External links/references ==
- Reza Ramezani Gilani profile at the Assembly of Experts (majles khobregan)
- Tag Archives: Ayatollah Reza Ramezani Gilani. Ijtihadnet Network
- Reza Ramezani Gilani's personal website
- Board of Trustees, Ahl al-Bayt University
