= Qoba Mosque =

Shi'ite mosque in Tehran, Iran

- مسجد قبا
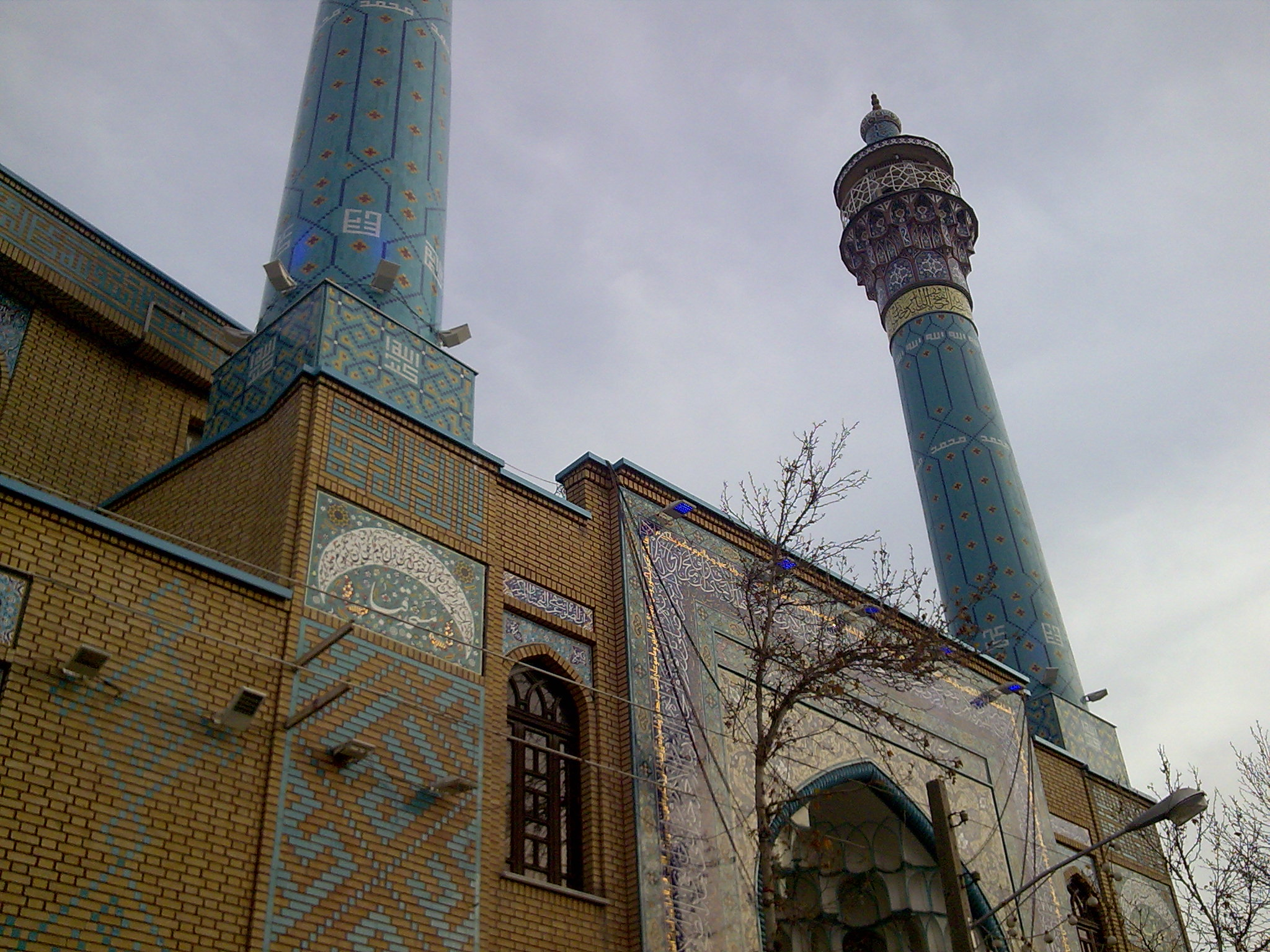
- The mosque façade and minarets in 2009

- Location of the mosque in Tehran

Religion
- Affiliation: Shia Islam
- Ecclesiastical or organizational status: Mosque
- Status: Active

Location
- Location: Tehran, Tehran province
- Country: Iran
- Interactive map of Qoba Mosque
- Coordinates: 35°45′38.03″N 51°26′58.47″E

Architecture
- Type: Mosque architecture
- Style: Pahlavi
- Completed: 1972 CE (1351 SH)
- Construction cost: IR 7,000,000

Specifications
- Dome: One
- Minaret: Two
- Materials: Bricks; mortar; tiles

The Qoba Mosque (Persian: مسجد قبا), also known as the Ghoba Mosque, is a Shi'ite mosque, located in the city of Tehran, in the province of Tehran, Iran. It is situated on Ghoba (Qoba) Street between Negin Street and Khushak Street, with a view of the Alborz Mountains to the north.

== Overview ==
During the Iranian Revolution, the mosque was a site of revolutionary gatherings. The mosque was closed by the Shah in 1975 because of Mohammad Mofatteh's political teachings; however it was reopened in 1978.

Following clashes after the 2009 Iranian presidential election, the Iranian government approved a peaceful prayer gathering centered on the mosque, in response to an appeal by Mir Hossein Mousavi to allow for the community to mourn Neda Agha-Soltan and Sohrab Aarabi, both killed in the earlier protests. On 28 June 2009, between 2,000 and 5,000 mourners assembled in the streets surrounding the mosque and yelled "Salam bar Beheshti, Dorood bar Mousavi." Whilst police authorities stood by, there was no significant escalation of violence surrounding the mosque.

== See also ==
- Shia Islam in Iran
- List of mosques in Iran
