= Haj Mohammad Hassan Amin-Alzarb =

Iranian businessman (1838–1898)

Haj Mohammad Hassan Amin Al-Zarb
- حاج محمدحسن امین‌الضرب
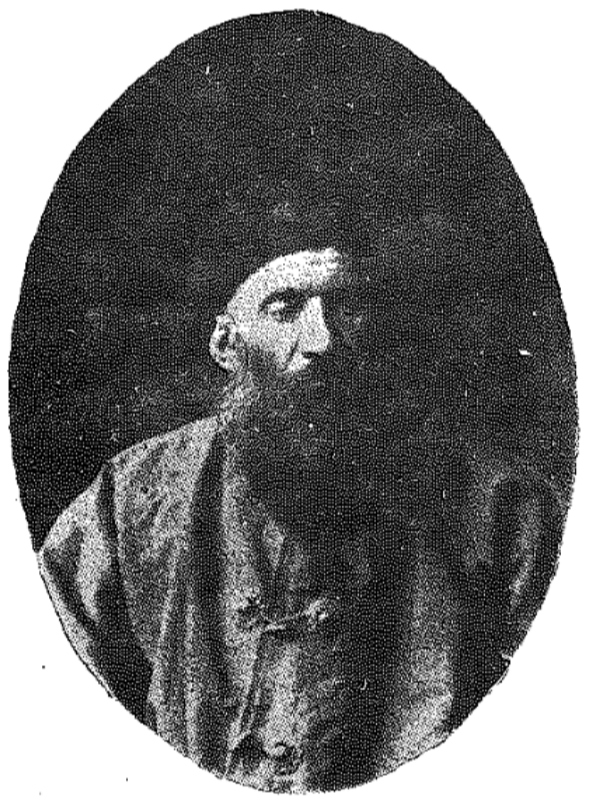

Assembly of Merchants
- Incumbent
- Assumed office 1883

Personal details
- Born: 1838 Isfahan, Sublime State of Iran
- Died: 1898 (aged 59–60)
- Spouse: Bibi Khan Mah Khanum
- Children: Mohammad Hossein Amin Al Zarb

Haj Mohammad Hassan Amin al-Zarb (1838–1898), titled Amin Dar-oz-zarb, custodian of the state mint under Naser al-Din Shah Qajar, was an Iranian self-made man who went on to become Iran's first major entrepreneur and the richest man in Iran.

== Early life ==
Haj Mohammad Hassan Amin Al-Zarb was born in Isfahan to a family that had been engaged in trade for at least three generations. His father died while Mohammad-Hasan was still a youth. Following his father's death, he came to Tehran and engaged himself in commerce. Mohammad Hossein's fate underwent a great change when he began to work with Panayotti, an agent of a Greek firm in Tehran.

== Trade activity ==
He built up his wealth as a money changer, a trader in textiles, precious stones, opium, carpets, agricultural products, and staple foodstuffs amongst other goods, and judicious transactions in land.

Though most frequently remembered for his experiments in the field of industry, his principle activities were in banking and foreign trade. From the 1870s he was one of Tehran’s most important sarrafs and in the last decade of his life he dealt in commercial and treasury bills, exchanged foreign currency, gave credit, and accepted deposits on a scale matched only by the Towmanians Brothers, Arbab Jamshid, and possibly the Ettehadiye Company.

He prepared the proposal to establish a bank in 1879, and one of his important doings was the proposal to build the first iron foundry in Iran in 1887–8.

He founded the first union of Iranian traders, called Assembly of Merchants, in 1883. The assembly has gone down into the Iranian history as the country's first parliament 26 years before the Constitutional Revolution led to the formation of a parliament where people sent their representatives. The Assembly of Merchants was the foundation of today's Tehran Chamber of Commerce, Industries, Mines, and Agriculture.
