= Mohammad Mofatteh =

Iranian philosopher, theologian and political activist (1928–1979)

Shahid Ayatollah Mohammad Mofatteh
- محمد مفتح
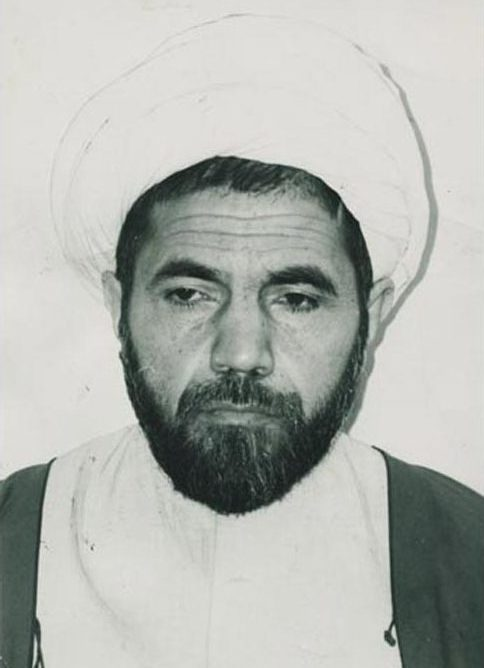

Personal life
- Born: 17 June 1928 Famenin, Iran
- Died: December 18, 1979 (aged 51) Tehran, Iran
- Cause of death: Assassination
- Resting place: Fatima Masumeh Shrine, Qom
- Children: Mohammad Mehdi; Mohammad Hadi
- Parent: Mahmoud Mofatteh
- Notable works: Tafsir Kabir Majmaolbayan; The Way of Thought; Outcomes of Imperialism

Religious life
- Religion: Shia Islam
- Sect: Twelver Shi'ism

Senior posting
- Based in: Tehran
- Post: Javid Mosque; Qoba Mosque
- Period in office: 1973–1979

Mohammad Mofatteh (Persian: محمد مفتح; 17 June 1928 – 18 December 1979) was an Iranian philosopher, theologian, and political activist. He was a Twelver Shia ayatollah and an important figure in the 1979 Iranian revolution, leading religious and anti-monarchist activities at Javid Mosque and Qoba Mosque. Mofatteh was arrested several times by SAVAK for his activities, and performed the 1978 Eid al-Fitr prayer that led to the Black Friday mass shooting.

In addition to his political activities, Mofatteh was the author of several books such as Translation of Tafsir Kabir Majmaolbayan, The Way of Thought, and Outcomes of Imperialism, among others. He also wrote many articles such as "The Role of Muslim Scientists in The Advance of Science" and "Where Did Islamic Scientific Movements Begin?". He was assassinated by four gunmen, all members of the Forqan Group, in front of the Theology Department of Tehran University on 18 December 1979. The day of his assassination is called the day for "unity among seminaries and universities" in Iran.

== Early life and education ==
He was born in Famenin, in Iran's Hamadan province, into a family of religious scholars. His father, Hajji Sheikh Mahmoud Mofatteh, known as Mirza Mahmoud, was one of the eminent teachers of Hamadan Seminary. His father also was knowledgeable in subjects including Arabic and Persian literature. Mohammad used to participate in his father's courses, from which absorbed his primary knowledge.

Mohammad Mofatteh attended Akhund Mullah Ali Hamedani's school in Hamadan. After completing his primary education there, at 16 he left for the well-known Islamic Seminary in Qom, where he was taught by teachers such as Ayatollahs Muhammad Hujjat Kuh-Kamari, Seyyed Hossein Borujerdi, Ruhollah Khomeini, Mohammad-Reza Golpaygani, Shahab al-Din Mar'ashi Najafi, and Muhammad Husayn Tabataba'i. He continued his studies at seminary and at the same time studied philosophy at Tehran University, where he earned his PhD and became a professor and a dean.

== Activities ==
=== Political ===
Mofatteh and Beheshti were among those who articulated Khomeini's spiritual and political authority in the Islamic revolution. In other words, they extended the views of Khomeini in politics and ideology. As a religious and political activist, he travelled to different places of Iran in the 1950s and 1960s. Especially during Ramadhan, Moharram, and Safar, he used to go to Khuzestan province to guide the people. After he developed his activities in Khuzestan, SAVAK prohibited his entrance to the province. In 1968 he was fired from the Department of Education for his political activities and was exiled to Zahedan. After the period of exile was finished, SAVAK prohibited his entrance to Qom and instead, "to neutralize his religio-political activities", suggested that he be assigned as a professor at Tehran University.

In 1973, at the invitation of the people, he went to Javid Mosque in Tehran to lead the prayers. There, he held ideological classes on "the fundamentals of beliefs", philosophy, Tafsir of Quran, Nahj al-Balagha, history of religions, and sociology. He continued his activities in the Javid Mosque so that it became a center for fighting against the Shah, leading to its closing on 24 November 1974 by SAVAK after Ali Khamenei's speech there, and Mofatteh being sent to prison for almost two months. In 1976 he accepted the responsibility of managing Qoba Mosque in Tehran, where he introduced some innovations such as inviting Egyptian Quran reciters, and inviting Abdul Fatah Abdul Maqsood, the author of the book Ali. He established a library and an interest-free loan center in the mosque. After a while, he was prohibited from giving lectures. As an Islamist leader, Ayatollah Mofatteh organized demonstrations in the Qoba Mosque against the Shah's regime.

Mofatteh traveled to Lebanon and Syria and visited Imam Musa Sadr, with whom he aimed to help the Lebanese evacuees and lead cultural activities. During that trip, Musa Sadr and Mofatteh decided to establish a center where the children of evacuees could obtain an education from the primary grades up to the university level. They bought a piece of land for constructing the center but they did not carry out their plan after Sadr's disappearance.

Mofatteh performed the prayer of Eid al-Fitr in 1978 in Gheytarieh, in which an unprecedented number of people took part and which was marked as a "shining point in the history of the Islamic Revolution". After finishing the prayer, he gave a "very revolutionary and crucial" lecture, mentioned "Imam Khomeini", and emphasized the importance of respecting him. The lecture led to demonstrations of 7 September (16 Shahrivar). He was injured in the demonstration, arrested while returning home from the hospital, and then imprisoned for two months. After the demonstration, people promised to gather the next day on 8 September at Jaleh (Shohada) Square which led to the Black Friday incident.

He was a part of Khomeini's welcoming committee and was responsible for managing the affairs in Behesht-e Zahra. The committee organized 65,000 people as a disciplinary force to protect Khomeini. Mofatteh was one of the founders of the Combatant Clergy Association, and was among those who joined secular organizations such as the Teachers Association in order to counter the influence of the Tudeh Party, and to "advance their common cause against the state".

=== Academic ===
Mofatteh was studying at the university and teaching in the seminary at the same time, which garnered criticism from some people who told him, in a kind manner, that this was tarnishing his status. As the initiator of "seminary-university unity", he studied philosophy at the university and attended seminary in Qom. Then he became a professor at Tehran University and taught divine law and principles of philosophy at Qom seminary. Like his colleague Professor Motahari, he started to teach university students in 1969. He was experienced enough in teaching because he was a teacher at a high school in Qom as well. Along with Ayatollah Sayyed Mohammad Hossein Beheshti, he worked at the Religion and Knowledge high school in Qom, where they aimed to familiarize the new generation with Islam and seminary students with academic and scientific activities. Also, for this goal, Mofatteh established the Islamic Association of Students and Educators, in cooperation with Ayatollah Beheshti and Ayatollah Ali Khamenei.

==== Works ====
He wrote many books, including Translation of Tafsir Kabir Majmaolbayan, The Way of Thought, and Outcomes of Imperialism. His doctoral dissertation was "Divine Wisdom in Nahj al-Balagha". He was concerned in the aforementioned essay with the relation of religion and philosophy. Besides those, he authored many works in different fields of Islamic science as follows:

- A gloss on Hikmat Muta'aliyyeh
- The way of thought in logic
- The verses of beliefs in Quran
- Unity of academics and seminary

He published articles mainly in "Islam School" and "Shia School" magazines. Also, he published some other articles entitled "The Role of Muslim Scientists in The Advance of Science", "Where Did Islamic Scientific Movements Begin?", "Muslims' learning and research in Medicine", and "Research Method of Muslim Scientists" (all of the above articles were published by the Iranian Research Organization for Science and Technology in a collection entitled "The Role of Scientists in the Advance of Science").

== Assassination ==
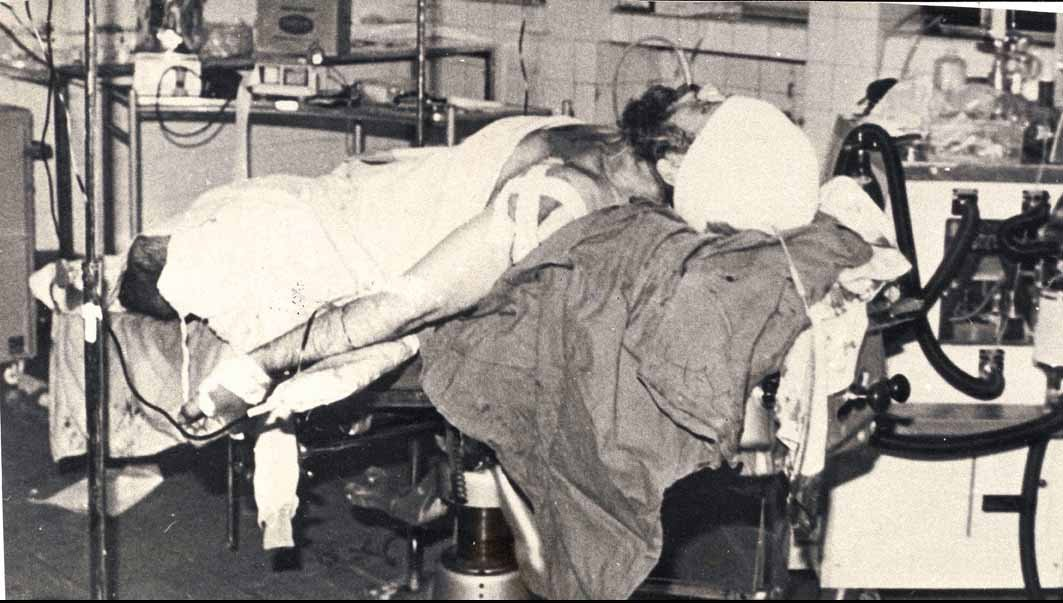
Mofatteh in the hospital following his assassination

Mofatteh was assassinated by Forqan Group, for political reasons, when he was in front of the building of Theology department of Tehran University along with his two guards, Asghar Nematy and Javad Bahmany, on 18 December 1979, when he was dean of the Theology Department. He was shot at four times, with the bullets going through his head, shoulder, hands, and knees. He was taken to Ayatollah Taleghany Hospital where he died on the same day. Four members of Forghan namely, Kamal Yassini, Mahmud Kashani, Mohammad Nouri, and Hassan Nouri, were charged in the assassination. Kamal Yasini, Mofatteh's assassin, a 20-year-old youth who held the responsibility of planning the groups terror, said that their previous terror attempts, including one at the Pars school, were unsuccessful and that he had aimed to perform the deed by himself.

=== Funeral ===
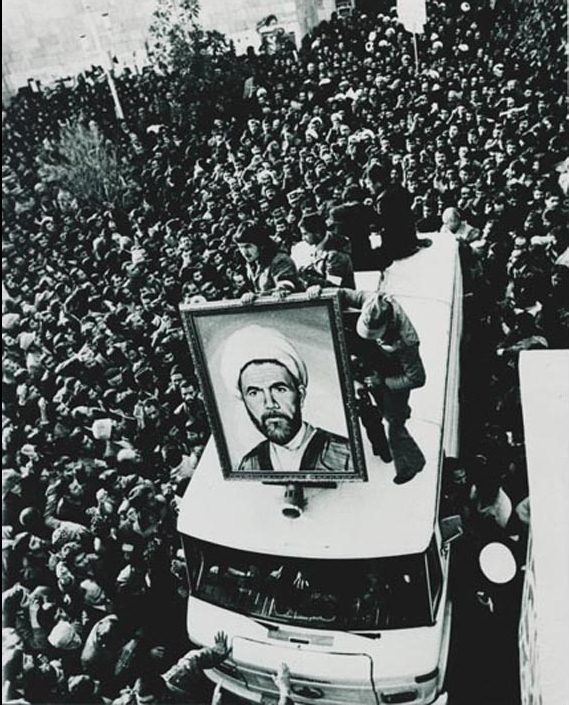
Mofatteh's funeral

On the morning of 19 December Mofatteh's body, with those of his guards, was carried from the university's mosque, then carried to Qom and buried in the courtyard of the Fatima Masumeh Shrine.

== Reception ==
December 18, the day Mofatteh was assassinated, is called the day for "unity among seminaries and universities".

== See also ==
- Mohammad Beheshti
- Morteza Motahhari
- Mohammad-Javad Bahonar

== Sources ==
- "The Cruel Stalemate Drags On: Threats, warnings and shifting signals on the hostages". TIME Magazine. United States. 1979-12-31. ISSN 0040-781X.
