= Tehran Chamber of Commerce, Industries, Mines, and Agriculture =

Tehran chamber of commerce

Tehran Chamber of Commerce, Industries, Mines & Agriculture
- اتاق بازرگانی، صنایع، معادن و کشاورزی تهران
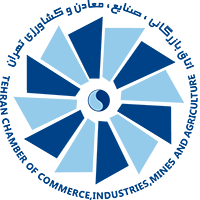
- Abbreviation: TCCIMA
- Formation: 1884; 142 years ago
- Legal status: Not-for-profit organisation
- Location(s): No. 275, Motahari Street Tehran Iran
- Region served: Worldwide
- Members: ~ 47,500 (by July 2025)
- Head: Mahmoud Najafi Arab
- Website: tccim.ir

The Tehran Chamber of Commerce, Industries, Mines, and Agriculture (commonly referred to as the Tehran Chamber of Commerce or TCCIMA) is Iran’s oldest economic institution, serving as a foundational pillar for much of the country’s commercial and industrial activity. The current president of the Tehran Chamber of Commerce is Mahmoud Najafi Arab

== History ==
The establishment of the Tehran Chamber of Commerce is generally associated with the establishment of the Ministry of Commerce and Agriculture in 1872 by Mirza Hosein Khan Sepahsalar, the then Minister of Commerce.

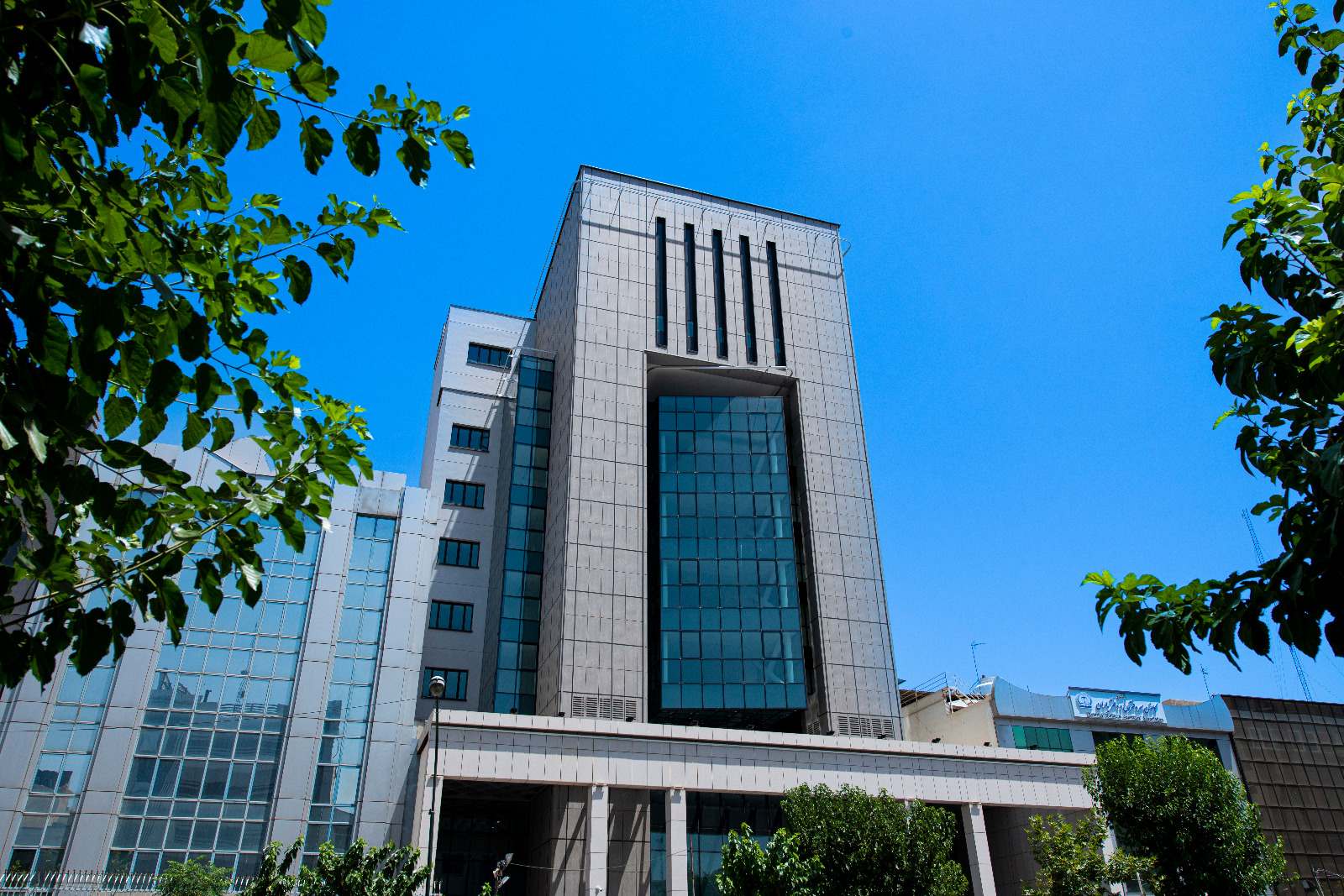
The modern headquarters of the Tehran Chamber of Commerce, located on Motahari Street, Tehran.

=== Founding and Early Years ===
With the fall of the Qajar dynasty and the rise of the Pahlavi Dynasty rule in Iran, the necessity of reforming economic institutions in line with international developments became apparent. As a result, the government issued a decree on February 7, 1926, mandating the creation of the “Tehran Merchants’ Chamber”.

The Tehran Chamber of Commerce, functioning as the country’s principal commercial body, was officially established on October 9, 1926, in a modest building near Tehran’s Grand Bazaar. It was initially headed by Haj Mohammad Hassan Amin-Alzarb. Soon after, Habibullah Amin al-Tojar succeeded him, and five other prominent merchants were appointed to the chamber’s board of directors. In 1942, a new law allowed for direct elections of chamber members, reducing government interference and renaming the institution to the Chamber of Commerce.

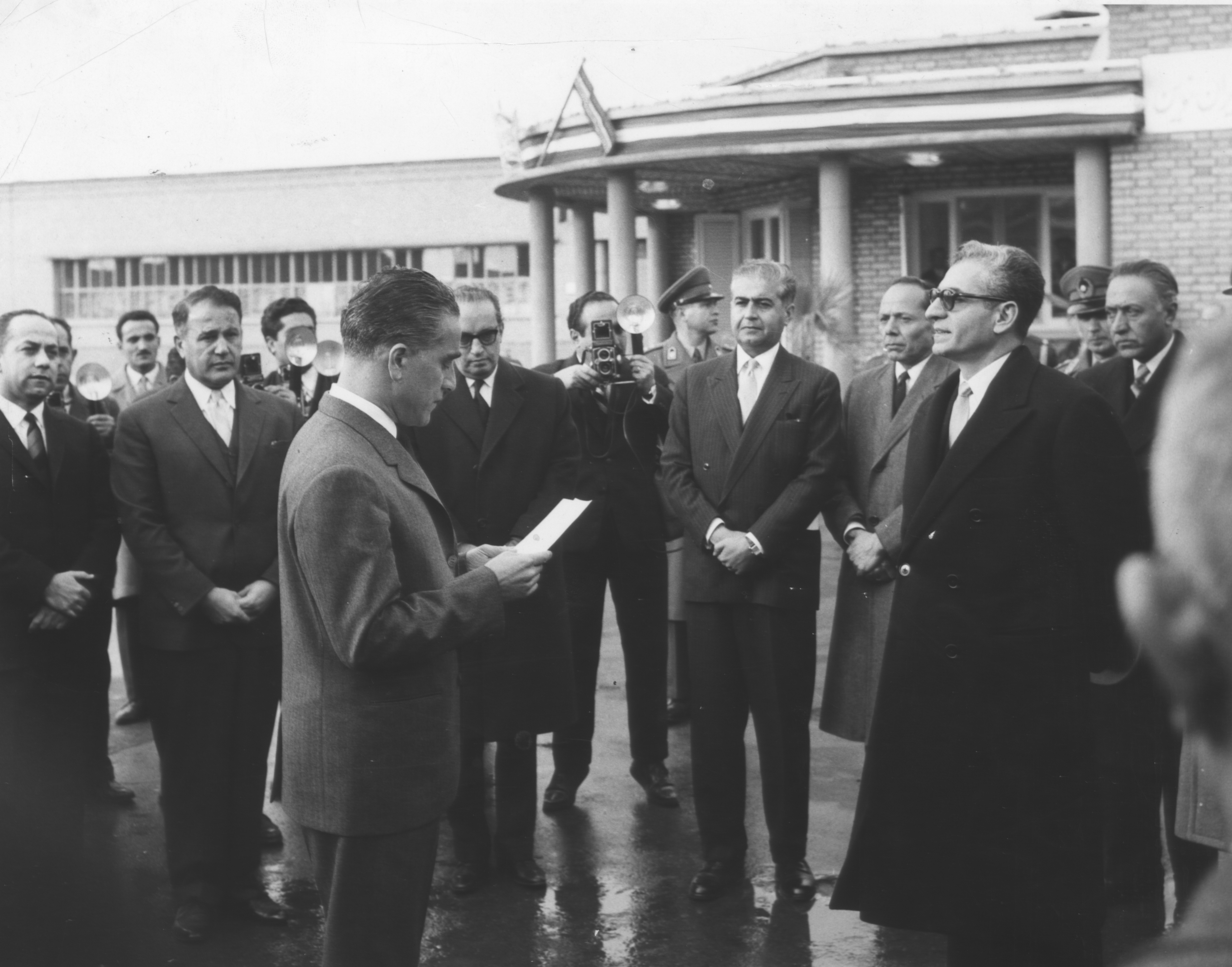
In 1961, a group of industrialists requested the formation of a separate chamber. Their efforts, supported by Taher Ziaei, the then Minister of Industries and Mines, led to the establishment of the Iran Chamber of Industries and Mines in 1962

=== Iran Chamber of Industries and Mines ===
In 1961, a group of industrialists petitioned Prime Minister Ali Amini for the formation of a dedicated Chamber of Industries and Mines. Their request was approved in September 1962, largely due to the efforts of Taher Ziaei, the then Minister of Industries and Mines. That same year, the Iran Chamber of Industries and Mines was established under the presidency of Jafar Sharif-Emami, with 30 prominent industrial and mining entrepreneurs taking part in its leadership.

From 1962 to 1969, the Tehran Chamber of Commerce and the Chamber of Industries and Mines operated independently. However, in 1969, legislation was passed to merge the two bodies. This merger was formalized in January 1970, creating the Iran Chamber of Commerce, Industries, Mines & Agriculture (ICCIMA).

==== Presidents Of Tehran Chamber of Commerce ====
===== Before the 1979 Revolution =====
No.	Name	Entered office	Left office	Time in office
1	Mohammad Hossein Amin-alzarb	1926	1933	7 years
2	Habibullah Amin al-Tojar	1933	1934	1 year
3	Abdul Hossein Nikpour	1934	1957	23 years
4	Abul-Hasan Sadeqi	1958	1959	1 year
5	Ali Vakili	1959	1965	6 years
6	Mohammad Khosroshahi	1965	1971	6 years
7	Taher Ziaei	1969	1980	11 years
8	Ali Akbar Mahlouji	1971	1975	4 years
9	Enayat Behbahani	1975	1979	4 years

==== After the 1979 Revolution ====
===== Revolutionary Impact =====
Following the Revolution of 1978-79, significant transformations took place in Iran’s economic landscape. Many leading entrepreneurs—including industrialists, financiers, and prominent members of the Tehran chamber of Commerce- either left the country or faced legal proceedings. Their assets were transferred to public ownership, and key industries were brought under state supervision.

== Post-Revolution Structure ==
Since the Revolution, the Board of Representatives of the Tehran Chamber of Commerce has been elected every four years by its members, which include both individual entrepreneurs and member companies holding valid commercial cards or business licenses. To date, ten electoral cycles have been held.

=== Presidents after the Revolution ===
Following the selection of an interim committee appointed by Imam Khomeini, Seyyed Alinaghi Khamoushi was elected as the head of both the Iran chamber and Tehran Chamber. He served until 2007 (1386 in the Persian calendar). Since then, the following individuals have held the presidency of the Tehran Chamber.

No.	Name	Entered office	Left office	Time in office
1	Alinaghi Khamoushi	1980	2002	22 years
2	Mohammad Reza Behzadian	2002	2005	3 years
3	Mohammad Nahavandian	2005	2006	1 years
4	Yahya Ale Eshaq	2006	2015	9 years
5	Masoud Khansari	2015	2022	7 years
6	Mahmoud Najafi Arab	2022	Incumbent	

== Tehran Chamber of Commerce Projects ==
Throughout its long and eventful history, the Tehran Chamber of Commerce has worked to advance the shared goals of Iran’s private sector and establish a distinct institutional identity. Today, the Chamber seeks to expand its activities beyond the economic realm, in line with the practices of leading chambers of commerce around the world. This includes the development of social and support initiatives in areas such as education, culture, philanthropy, and innovation.

Key initiatives of the Tehran Chamber of Commerce include the establishment of the Bazarganan Hospital, the Islamic Centre Hamburg, the Islamic Centre of Hamburg, the Merchants’ Charity Foundation, the Takapoo, Business School The Chamber also provides support for innovative enterprises, issues electronic certificates of origin, promotes private sector organizations, and annually awards the Amin al-Zarb Medal to distinguished entrepreneurs.

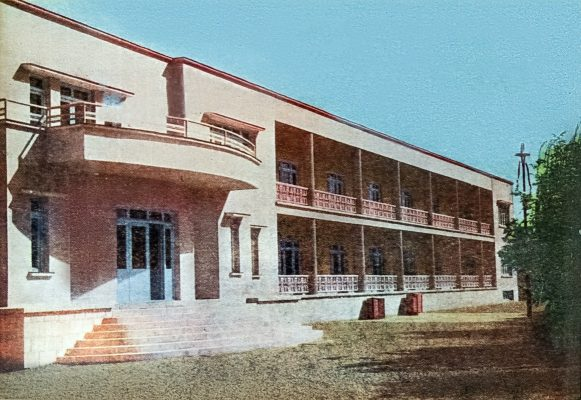
Bazarganan Hospital, established in the 1940s, is considered the oldest charitable private hospital affiliated with the Tehran Chamber of Commerce.

=== Bazarganan Hospital, The Oldest Private Hospital ===
During World War II a group of merchants and philanthropists affiliated with the Tehran Chamber of Commerce sought to assist vulnerable populations suffering from the war's hardships. Their goal was to collect donations from esteemed business figures and distribute aid to those in need.

Among the founding members of this initiative was Mr. Abdolhossein Nikpour, then Chairman of the Tehran Chamber of Commerce. Upon returning to Iran in the early 1920s, he established a gynecology and obstetrics clinic on family-owned land in the Sabzeh Meydan area of Tehran. The clinic served women from low-income backgrounds and later evolved into a broader healthcare initiative.

Construction of Bazarganan Hospital began in May 1948, and the facility became operational by February 1949. Final completion and full expansion of the hospital were achieved by 1951. Today, it stands as one of the oldest charitable medical centers established by the private sector in Iran.

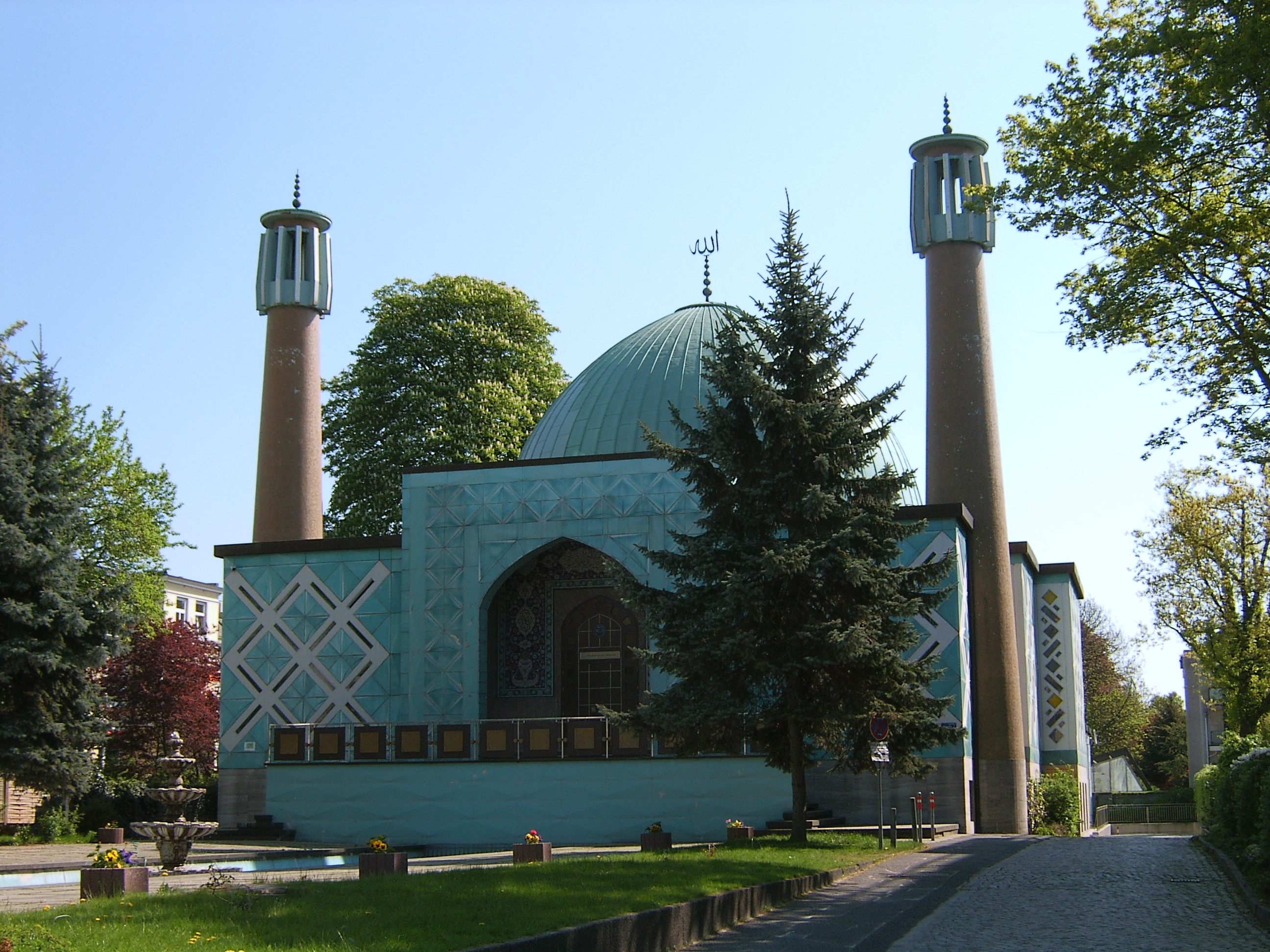
Imam-Ali-Moschee Hamburg (Islamic Centre of Hamburg), established by Iranian merchants in the 1950

=== Islamic Centre Hamburg ===
The Islamic Centre of Hamburg was founded in the late 1950s by a group of Iranian emigrants and businesspeople. In June 1953, several Hamburg-based Iranian merchants, following consultations with their spiritual leader Ayatollah Husayn Burujardi in Qom, formed an association to establish a mosque for the Iranian community in Germany.

Construction of the center commenced following the arrival of Ayatollah Mohammad Mohagheghi in Hamburg. The structure’s main shell was completed in May 1963, and the centre has since served as a prominent religious and cultural institution for the Iranian diaspora.

Takapoo School In 2019, the Takapoo Business School (also referred to as TCAPU School) was established through a collaboration between the Tehran Chamber of Commerce and Amirkabir University of Technology (AUT). Operating on a business-oriented model, the school is dedicated to cultivating managerial and entrepreneurial talent to serve the evolving needs of Iran’s private sector.

Amin Al-Zarb Award The Amin al-Zarb Award is presented annually to honor outstanding entrepreneurs and senior figures from Iran’s private sector. The first Amin al-Zarb Festival was held on the 133rd anniversary of the Tehran Chamber of Commerce, Industries, Mines, and Agriculture, highlighting the contributions of the private sector to national development.

== See also ==
- Venture capital in Iran
- Trade Promotion Organization (Iran)
- Economy of Iran
- Industry of Iran
- Mining in Iran
- Agriculture in Iran
- Taxation in Iran
- Iran's international rankings in economy
- List of major economic laws in Iran
- Ministry of Industries and Mines (Iran)
- Bank of Industry and Mine
