= Abuzar Mosque =

Historic mosque in Tehran, Iran

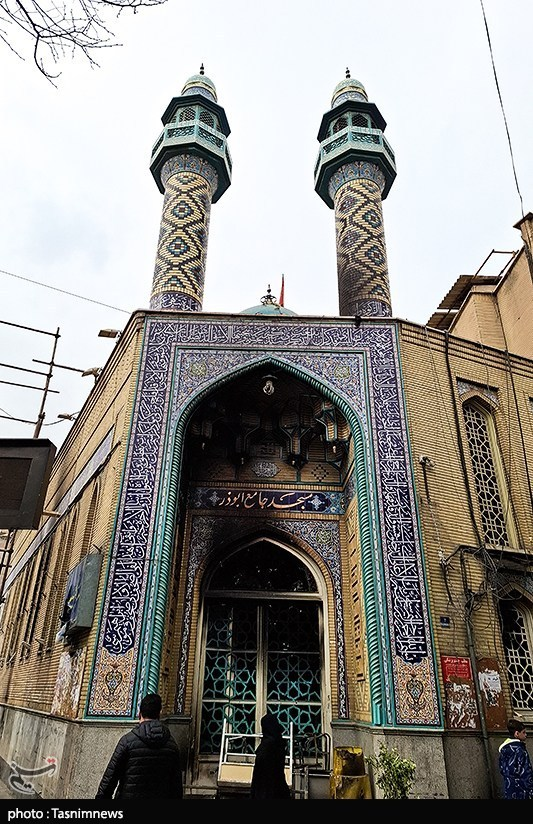
- Abuzar Mosque in January 2026

Religion
- Affiliation: Shia Islam
- Ecclesiastical or organizational status: Mosque
- Status: Active

Location
- Location: Tehran, Tehran province
- Country: Iran
- Interactive map of Abuzar Mosque
- Coordinates: 35°39′28″N 51°21′51″E

Abuzar Mosque (Persian: مسجد ابوذر) is a historic mosque in Tehran, Iran. It was the site where Ayatollah Ali Khamenei was injured in an attempted assassination on 27 June 1981. According to RadioFreeEurope, the interior was "targeted" and "gutted" during the 2025–2026 Iranian protests. The 2026 incident occurred on 8 January.
