= Mohammad Bagher Ansari =

Iranian journalist

Mohammad Bagher Ansari (Persian: محمدباقر انصارى; born 1946) is Twelver Shi'a Islamic theologian, Islamic law scholar and philosopher with the religious Rank Hujjat al-Islam.

== Life ==
He was born in Mahallat, where he studied in elementary school; then he studied the religious sciences at the theological school. He studied new sciences in the high schools of this city. In addition to learning religious sciences, he studied Russian, German, and Arabic language. He completed his training in higher theology with a focus on Islamic law and philosophy in Qom in 1981. From 1971 to 1976 he worked in a three-person research group led by Ayatollah Sayed Mohammad Beheshti with Quran interpretation and the relationship between occidental philosophy and Islam. During these years another translation appeared on the subject of different Christian schools of faith. In 1971, Hujjat al-Islam Ansari founded an "Office for International Islamic Relations" in Qom and contacted other Islamic institutions. After the Islamic Revolution, he carried out various charitable activities. From 1982 to 1992 he was deputy chair of the "Organization for Islamic Dissemination". He was also editor-in-chief of the English-language newspaper Tehran Times. From 1992 to 1998 he was head of the Islamic Center Hamburg. Since his return to Iran, the maintenance and expansion of international relations have been part of his area of activity. He is doing academic and religious activities. Mr. Ansari has written various articles in different areas of Islamic studies and has carried out research on Christianity.
