= Jennifer Jasberg =

German politician (born 1983)

Member of the Hamburg Parliament
- Incumbent
- Assumed office 18 March 2020
- Constituency: Bergedorf

Personal details
- Born: 16 May 1983 (age 42)
- Party: Alliance 90/The Greens (since 2003)

Jennifer Jasberg (born 16 May 1983) is a German politician serving as a member of the Hamburg Parliament since 2020. From 2020 to 2025, she served as co-group leader of Alliance 90/The Greens.
