= 1981 attempted assassination of Ali Khamenei =

1981 assassination attempt in Tehran, Iran

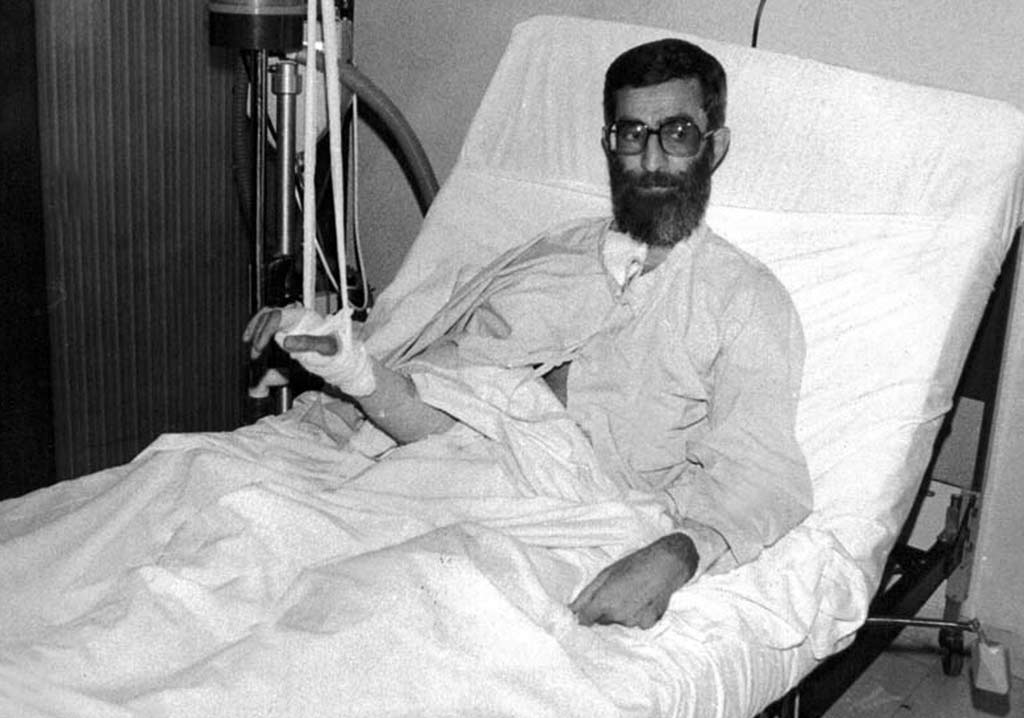
- Khamenei recovering in Baharloo Hospital, Tehran, following the attack
- Location: Abuzar Mosque, Tehran, Iran
- Date: 27 June 1981; 45 years ago
- Target: Ali Khamenei
- Attack type: Explosion
- Injuries: 1 (Khamenei)
- Accused: People's Mojahedin Organization of Iran

On 27 June 1981, in the Abuzar Mosque in Tehran, Iran, Ali Khamenei was injured after he gave a speech for prayers, when a bomb placed on the tape recorder in front of him exploded, damaging his right arm, vocal cords and lungs.

== Background ==
With the collapse of the Pahlavi monarchy following the Islamic Revolution of 1979, Ayatollah Ruhollah Khomeini prioritized the establishment of absolute clerical hegemony through the Islamic Republican Party (IRP). Consequently, rival factions ranging from secular nationalists and Marxist leftists to the People's Mojahedin of Iran (MEK) found themselves marginalized, and the tenuous coalitions formed during the revolution began to disintegrate rapidly. Loyalist forces mobilized the Revolutionary Committees and the Revolutionary Guards to suppress dissent, a campaign that culminated in the banning of organizations such as the National Democratic Front in August 1979.

Amidst this factional strife and political turbulence, Ali Khamenei was appointed to the Revolutionary Council, a body established to oversee the interim government and consolidate power. Tasked with the grave responsibility of shielding the nascent government from multifaceted internal threats, he also served a brief tenure supervising the Islamic Revolutionary Guard Corps (IRGC) in December 1979.

In a definitive turning point for the political landscape, Islamist students besieged the US Embassy in Tehran on 4 November 1979, taking 52 Americans hostage. This incident, bolstered by Khomeini's endorsement, forced the resignation of the moderate Prime Minister Mehdi Bazargan, thereby further entrenching the control of the hardline clergy. Subsequently, in January 1980, Khomeini appointed Khamenei as the Friday Prayer Imam (Khatib) of Tehran, succeeding Ayatollah Mahmoud Taleghani. Delivering weekly sermons from the pulpit of Tehran University, Khamenei emphasized unity under Islamic governance and launched scathing critiques against opposition factions, including the MEK, accusing them of undermining the revolution's core principles. Through these addresses, he personified the state's drive to assert clerical supremacy over rival ideologies, establishing himself as a preeminent guardian of religious conservatism.

Meanwhile, the intense resentment aimed at the purges of suspected "internal enemies" along with the arrest and execution of former allies coalesced into organized opposition by 1980. By early 1981, as President Abolhassan Banisadr's grip on power became increasingly precarious, opposition violence escalated dramatically. A wave of assassinations targeting Revolutionary Guards and government officials swept through Tehran and the provinces; dozens of such attacks occurred in the first half of the year alone. Exploiting the security lapses and the deeply polarized environment resulting from the mass protests and severe government crackdowns in June, insurgents intensified their operations. It was against this backdrop of turbulence in mid-1981 that Ali Khamenei's ascent as a paramount figure in the national leadership reached its fruition.

== Event ==
Five days after Banisadr was deposed, the news of the day was about the Iran–Iraq War after the declaration of armed conflict. On 27 June 1981, while Khamenei had returned from the frontline and had visited Khomeini, he went to the Abuzar Mosque to give a speech to the prayers as per his Saturday schedule. At that time, he was Khomeini's representative at the Supreme Council of National Defense. After the first prayer, Khamenei began to answer questions submitted by attendees. A tape recorder with papers was set on the desk in front of Ali Khamenei by a young man who pressed the play button. After one minute, the tape recorder began blaring a loud whistling sound and then exploded. After the bombing, the clerics praying at the mosque said that the tape recorder was divided into two parts and on the inner wall of the tape recorder was written "the gift of Forqan Group to Islamic republic".

The convalescence of Ayatollah Khamenei took several months, and his vocal cords, and lungs were seriously injured; his right arm would be paralyzed for the remainder of his life due to the attack.

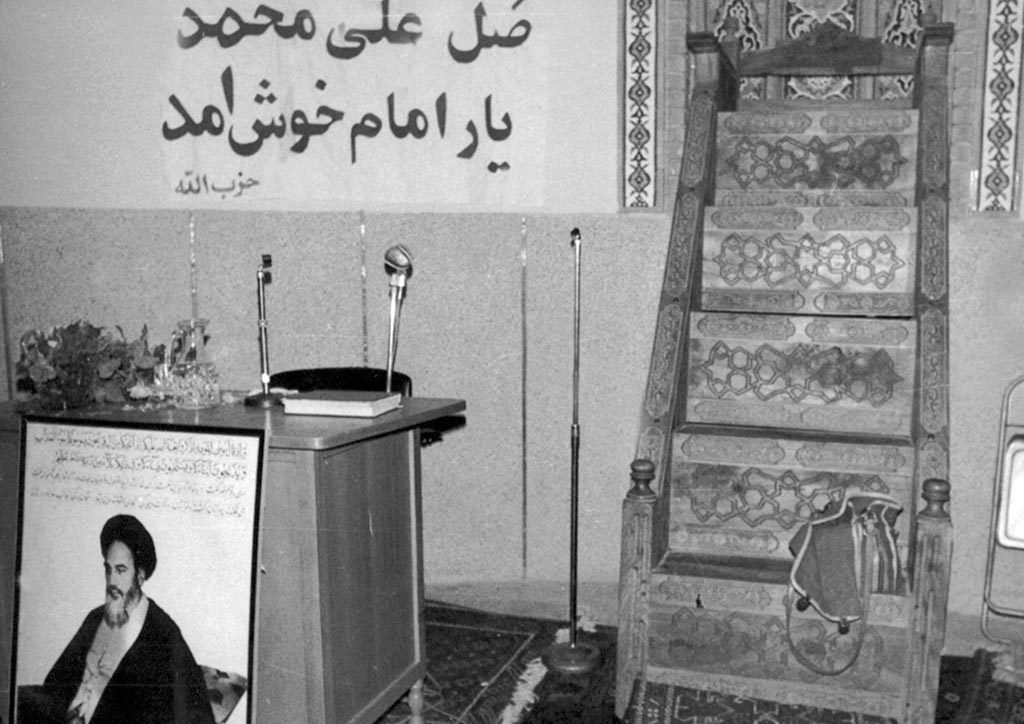
Place of the assassination attempt in the lecture hall in Abuzar Mosque

=== Perpetrator ===
Khamenei's website claims that the assassination was planned by the People's Mojahedin Organization of Iran (MEK).

In an article by self-proclaimed political activist Iraj Mesdaghi, who the MEK claims is an agent of the Iranian regime, Mesdaghi suggested the assassination attempt was perpetrated by a man named Amir Khan Zade. The Islamic Revolution Document Center identified the person who delivered the recorder as Masud Taqi Zade.

== Subsequent incidents ==
The day after the attempted assassination, a large bombing at the headquarters of the Islamic Republican Party (IRP) in Tehran was conducted by Khalq, according to several non-Iranian sources. The bombing killed at least 74.

== See also ==
- Assassination and terrorism in Iran
