= Abbas Hosseini Ghaemmaghami =

Iranian ayatollah

Seyed Abbas Hosseini Ghaemmaghami is an Islamic theologian, philosopher and social scientist from Iran. Since 2004, Ghammaghami has been in charge of Islamic Centre Hamburg as Imam and director. Ghammaghami is also the chairman of the Islamic Academy of Germany.

== Early life, education and career ==
He is descendant of Mirza Seyed Abul Ghassem Ghammagham Farahani who was a reputed politician and scholar in Teheran. Descending through the father he is 34th generation grandchild of Ali Zayn al-Abidin. Ghammaghami got religious education at The Theological College in Teheran in addition to the official studying. He studied Islamic law, philosophy and mysticism at the universities of Teheran and Qom. He became a mujtahid in Islamic law. He lectured of Islamic law, mysticism, political thoughts, comparative scholastic theology and philosophy at The Theological College in Teheran as well as at several universities of Teheran. He was invited to lecture of mysticism and theology by the Department of Middle East Researches of Berkeley University.

In 1998, some of his works were published. With these studies in the field of Islamic law, for the first time, a concept of Ijtihad on the basis of primary Islamic principles (sharia) began to be discussed. In 1998, the collection of his works in the field of Islamic law ‘ Islamic Law Studies’ was selected as the best book of the year in the field of ‘Islamic Law’ and ‘Methodology’.

He made a statement to Frankfurter Allgemeine Zeitung in November 2010 with the title: ‘Does Qor’an let fornicators be stoned?’

He condemned violent protests that occurred in connection with a fatwa declared after 7 July 2005 London bombings, stating the incompatibility of Islam and terror.

He is also the chairman of IEUS (Islamic European Union of Shi'a Scholars and Theologians) that has members from 16 European countries. The main objective of the Union is to create more understanding with European societies and to establish a perception of Islam on the basis of reason and to refuse extremist actions under the name of Islam. On the EU interfaith assembly, he expressed his willingness to cooperate with Jewish scholars on certain issues.
