= Forqan Group =

1976–1980 islamist Iranian militant organisation

- Leaders: Akbar Goodarzi, leader (executed); Abbas Askari, deputy leader (executed)
- Dates active: c. 1976–January/May 1980
- Headquarters: Tehran, Jamalzadeh St., 23 Akhavan Alley
- Active regions: Tehran, Urmia, Tabriz
- Ideology: Islamism; Islamic extremism; Anti-clericalism; Anti-imperialism; Anti-capitalism
- Size: 49
- Wars: Consolidation of the Iranian Revolution

Forqan Group (Persian: گروه فرقان, romanized: Gorouh-e Forqan) was an Iranian militant opposition group. It had a clandestine cell system, and had a Shia anti-clerical Islamist ideology, and were thought to be primarily a leftist Islamic group.

Forqan assassinated senior Iranian officials including Gen. Valiollah Qarani, Morteza Motahari, Mohammad Mofatteh and Mohammad Ali Qazi Tabatabaei. It also attempted to assassinate future Supreme Leader Khamenei in 1981. The primary motive behind these assassinations was Forqan's rejection of the ayatollahs, whom they considered "reactionary clerics". The group became defunct following the arrest and execution of its key members in 1980.

The Forqan Group opposed other social sectors such as the "wealthy bazaaris", the "liberal politicians" and the "Marxist atheists" who, in their view, "were plotting to betray the Islamic Revolution". The group self-proclaimed to be followers of Ali Shariati, however, according to Ronen Cohen, the claim was used instrumentally to look more "prestigious" and allow them to develop their combined ideology.

== Etymology ==
A Dictionary of Modern Written Arabic describes "forqan" as a meaning "criterion" or "standard". Uri Rubin introduced Forqan as one of the names of the Quran. The root of this word means "separate". In the History of the Prophets and Kings and Tafsir al-Razi the root of this word means "God's separating or distinguishing between truth and falsehood, defined as f-r-q".

== History ==
The Forqan group was an Islamic Shia group that promoted a view of Islam that opposes the existence of religious clergy. Most of its members came from a lower middle-class background, with a large portion originating from Qolhak in the northern part of Tehran.

According to the Shariati thought, the rule of the unity of God forms the basic element of an equal and just society in the tradition of the Islamic prophet Muhammad. He believed that the Twelve Imams (not Rashidun except Ali) are the real successors of Muhammad and they tried to make an equal society. He considered Shia Islam above all ideologies and religions, but believed clerics should not have key political positions. Akbar Goodarzi was affected by the revolutionary thought of Shariati and authored an interpretation of the Quran named "monotheistic ideology". Shariati believed in Islam without clerics, similar to Abul A'la Maududi's ideas but Goodarzi was more fanatical than Shariati and in 1970 the Forqan group was founded by Goodarzi. Another person who had important effect on forming the ideology of the Forqan group was Habibollah Ashouri, a disgruntled cleric.

The climax of the Forqan group's activities came in the early days after the 1979 Iranian revolution. By early 1980, the group was effectively eliminated due to a series of arrests.

== Activities ==
The Forqan group claimed responsibility for a number of assassinations during the 1979 Revolution, including: Mohammad Taghi Haji Tarkhani, Abbas Amir-Entezam, Seyed Razi Shirazi, Seyed Mohsen Behbahani, Hosein Mahdian, Mehdi Araghi, Hesam Iraqi, Mohammad Baqir Dashtianeh, Hans Joachim Leib, Mohammad Ali Qazi Tabatabaei, Mohammad Mofatteh, Javad Bahmani, Asghar Nemati, Faqih Imani, Qasim Rouhani, Mohammad-Vali Gharani, and Morteza Motahhari.

The assassination attempts on prominent Iranians such as Ahmad Ladjevardi, Ali Khamenei and Abdul-Karim Mousavi Ardebili are also attributed to the Forqan group.

The assassinations were usually carried out by shooting from moving motorcycles.

== See also ==
- Attempted assassination of Ali Khamenei
