= State Office for the Protection of the Constitution of Hamburg =

The State Office for the Protection of the Constitution of the Free and Hanseatic City of Hamburg is the state authority for the protection of the constitution in the federal state of Hamburg. The main tasks of the state authority include monitoring right-wing extremism, left-wing extremism, foreign extremism, fundamentalism of all kinds, counter-espionage and monitoring the Scientology organization.

== Legality ==
The State Office for the Protection of the Constitution of the Free and Hanseatic City of Hamburg and its employees work on the basis of the Hamburg Constitution Protection Act and the Federal Constitution Protection Act. The cooperation takes place with the other state intelligence agencies. The legal regulation of the Federal Constitution Protection Act ensures that citizens' data protection is protected and is subject to the principle of proportionality. The security screening of people is only permitted on a legal basis. The prerequisite for a screening is the directive of the Hamburg Security Screening Act.

== Duties ==
As a domestic intelligence service, the primary task of the State Office for the Protection of the Constitution of the Free and Hanseatic City of Hamburg is to protect the free democratic basic order. Security also serves the federal government and the states. In order to take this protection and security into account, the State Office for the Protection of the Constitution collects information from open and/or intelligence resources on corresponding efforts that have decided against the legal interest. In order to do justice to these tasks, Paragraph §4 is applied. The filtered findings on extremism are transmitted to the Senate of the Free and Hanseatic City of Hamburg, for example, in the annual report of the Office for the Protection of the Constitution, in order to draw attention to the corresponding dangers caused by extremism and to be legally prepared. This information is made available to the general public, to every individual citizen, on the State Office's website. This extremism mainly takes the form of right-wing extremism, left-wing extremism, foreign extremism and fundamentalism. Attention is also paid to espionage and sabotage.

== Control ==
The work of the State Office for the Protection of the Constitution of the Free and Hanseatic City of Hamburg is subject to continuous control by the "Parliamentary Control Committee" of the Hamburg Parliament. The G 10 Commission of the Parliament decides on the admissibility and necessity of measures to restrict the secrecy of letters, mail and telecommunications. The Hamburg Commissioner for Data Protection and Freedom of Information also has extensive control powers. As with all other authorities, the administrative actions of the Office for the Protection of the Constitution are in principle subject to judicial review.

== Budget ==
After the terrorist attacks on September 11, 2001, the number of employees at the state agency was increased annually, and in 2008, 148 employees were hired. The number of employees is regulated by a staffing plan. The financial resources required also increased annually, and were given as a total of €11,589,000 for 2008. The agency's intelligence information system shows 31,124 people stored for 2008. In 2008, the state agency expressed concerns about ten naturalization cases. In the same year, 21 cases were examined in the residency process. On the basis of the Schengen Agreement, 14 cases were assessed as questionable in the corresponding visa procedures in 2008. In order to combat sabotage, the state agency subjected 9,115 people to an air security check at Hamburg Airport in 2008. Checks were also carried out at the Port of Hamburg. The Port Security Act 2008 was applied to 59 people.

== Structure ==
In order to optimally cover all areas of responsibility, the State Office for the Protection of the Constitution of the Free and Hanseatic City of Hamburg is divided into departments. The hierarchy is formed by a head of department. This is followed by departments 1 to 3. These, in turn, are divided into sections.

== Departments and Units ==
- Head of Office: Torsten Voß
  - Department V1: Central tasks
    - Section V11: Administration
    - Section V12: Central IT and G10
    - Section V13: Operational
  - Department V2: Evaluation
    - Department V201: Principles, participation tasks
    - Department V21: Islamism
    - Department V22: Right-wing extremism, Scientology
    - Department V23: Left-wing extremism, extremism with a foreign connection
  - Department V3: Counter-espionage, security, law
    - Department V31: Security
    - Department V32: Counter-espionage and economic protection
  - Department V4: Intelligence gathering
    - Department V41: Observation, conspiratorial investigation
    - Department V42: Research, advertising and surveys
    - Department V43: VP leadership

== Lineage ==
Zeitraum	Name
1969–1981	Hans Josef Horchem (SPD)
1981–1991	Christian Lochte (CDU)
1991–1996	Ernst Uhrlau (SPD)
1996–2002	Reinhard Wagner (CDU)
2002–2010	Heino Vahldieck (CDU)
2011–2014	Manfred Murck
seit 2014	Torsten Voß (CDU)
