= Open Mosque Day =

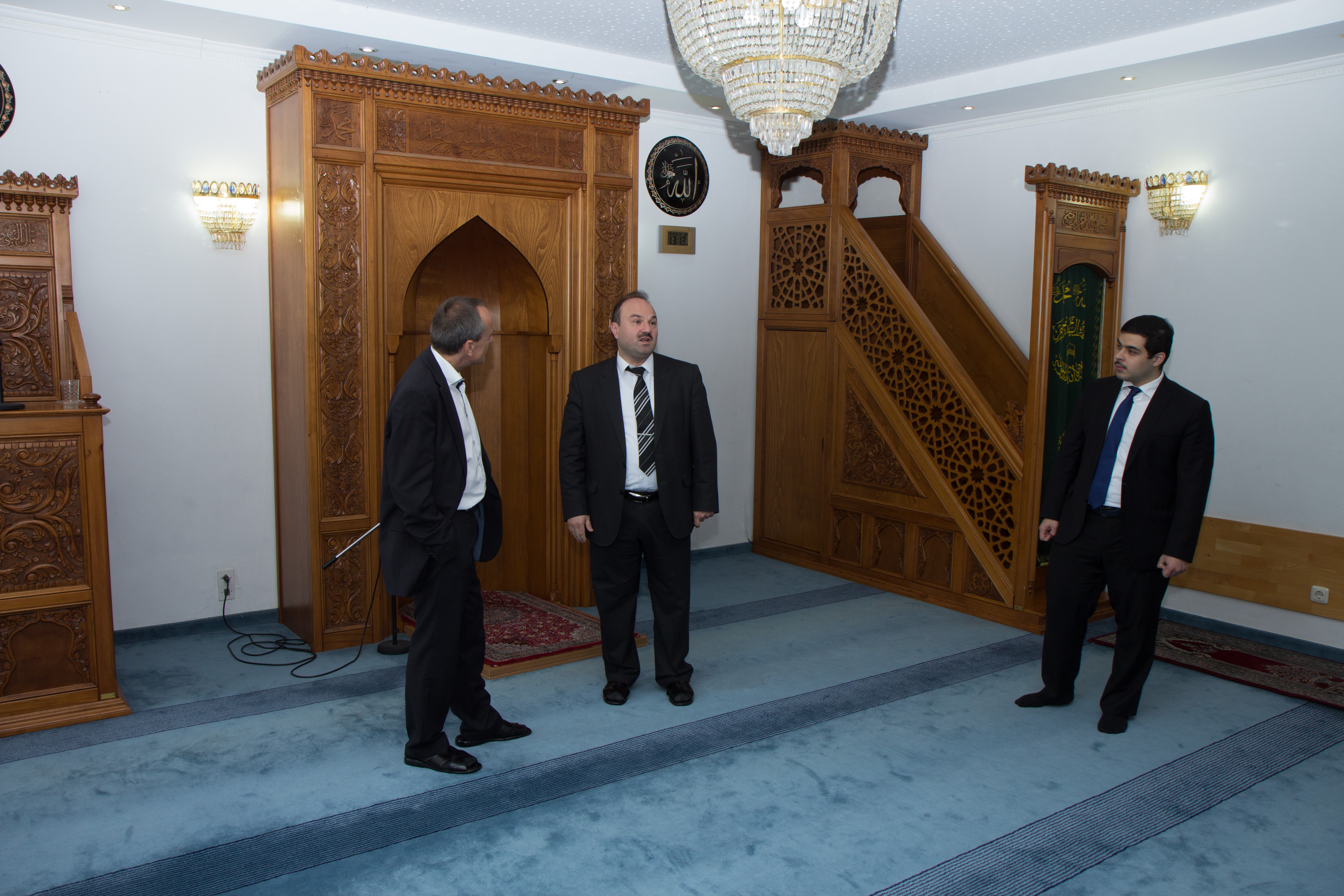
Konrad Wolf, Minister for Science, Further Education and Culture in Rhineland-Palatinate visits the Ulu Camii Mosque of the Association of Islamic Cultural Centers (VIKZ) in Mainz-Gonsenheim on October 3, 2018 as part of the nationwide "Day of Open Mosques".

The Day of the Open Mosque (German: Tag der offenen Moschee) in Germany is an annually scheduled event day that has existed since 1997 and takes place on October 3, the Day of German Unity. On this day, the mosque communities offer the predominantly non-Muslim visitors mosque tours, panel discussions and book and art exhibitions. Folklore, tea, coffee and pastries are also often part of the social program.

According to the Central Council of Muslims in Germany, the date was deliberately chosen to highlight the goal of cross-religious understanding. It is also intended to express the Muslims' self-image of being part of the German state, which was reunified in 1990, and their solidarity with all non-Muslim inhabitants of Germany.

In 2021, the Open Mosque Day celebrated its 25th anniversary during the COVID-19 pandemic.

== History ==
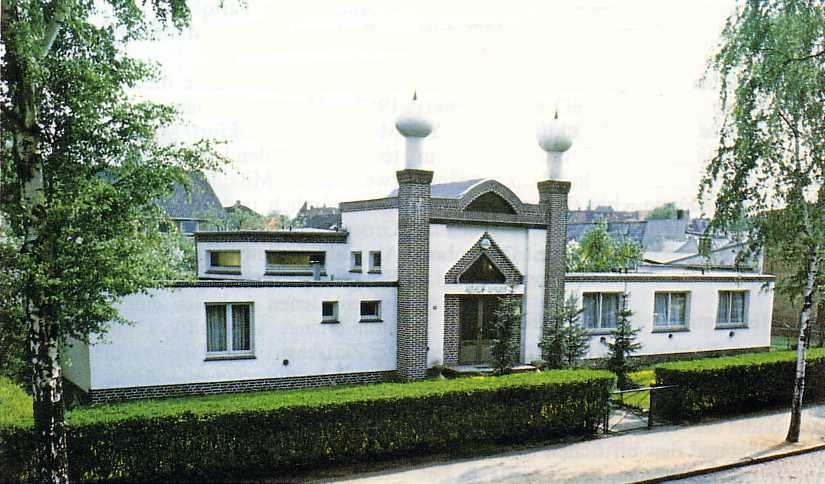
Fazle Omar Mosque Germany's first post-war mosque

The Day of the Open Mosque (TOM) goes back to an initiative of the Central Council of Muslims in Germany (ZMD) in Cologne in 1997, in which other Muslim umbrella organizations participated. It was also prompted by the European Year against Racism and Xenophobia (1997) and the Intercultural Week - Week of Foreign Citizens from September 28 to October 4, 1997. The Intercultural Week takes place annually at the end of September, from Sunday to Saturday before Thanksgiving.

On the first Open Mosque Day on October 3 and 4, 1997, 600 mosques nationwide participated. Since then, around 1,000 mosques from various Islamic associations throughout Germany have opened their doors to over 100,000 visitors every year.

Since 2007, Open Mosque Day has been managed by the Coordination Council of Muslims in Germany (KRM). The KRM is the umbrella organization of the four largest Islamic organizations in Germany: the Diyanet İşleri Türk İslam Birliği (DİTİB), the Islamic Council for the Federal Republic of Germany (Islamrat), the Association of Islamic Cultural Centers (VIKZ) and the Central Council of Muslims in Germany (ZMD). The KRM was founded during the German Islam Conference in 2007.

Every year, the Coordination Council uses a motto to promote the Open Mosque Day, in which more than 1,000 mosque communities participate:

- 2007: Mosques - bridges for a common future
- 2008: Mosques - Places of Reflection and Celebration
- 2009: Mosques - An integral part of society / 60 years of the Federal Republic and its Muslims
- 2010: The Koran - 1400 years, up-to-date and in the middle of life
- 2011: Muhammad - Prophet of Mercy
- 2012: Islamic art and culture
- 2013: Environmental protection - Mosques take action
- 2014: Social responsibility - Muslims for society
- 2015: Young Muslims in Germany - Motivated, Committed, Active
- 2016: Hijrah - Migration as a Challenge and Opportunity
- 2017: Good Neighborhood - Better Society
- 2018: Religiosity - Individual, Natural, Normal
- 2019: People make home(s)
- 2020: Faith in extraordinary times
- 2021: 25 years of TOM - Mosques yesterday and today
- 2022: Scarce resources - great responsibility
- 2023: Prayer - Reflects, Enlivens, Connects

== Opinions ==
We should pay more attention to such places and days where encounters are made possible and coexistence is successful. I hope that the contributions that Muslims make to our society on the basis of their faith will be given the appreciation they deserve. You and your communities naturally belong in the midst of our democratic, religiously diverse society. Take this place in the middle, which you deserve, and fill it. Help shape this community, because it is your society!
(German: Wir sollten solchen Orten und Tagen, an denen Begegnung ermöglicht wird und Zusammenleben gelingt, mehr Aufmerksamkeit schenken. Ich wünsche mir, dass den Beiträgen, die Muslime aus ihrem Glauben heraus für unsere Gesellschaft erbringen, die Wertschätzung zuteilwird, die sie verdienen. Sie und Ihre Gemeinden gehören selbstverständlich in die Mitte unserer demokratischen, religiös so vielfältigen Gesellschaft. Nehmen Sie sich diesen Platz in der Mitte, der Ihnen zusteht, und füllen Sie ihn aus. Gestalten Sie dieses Gemeinwesen mit, denn es ist Ihre Gesellschaft!)

— Federal President Frank-Walter Steinmeier, Press release on 25th anniversary of the Open Mosque Day, Bundespräsident

This day alone is not enough to get in touch with our neighbors and interested people. But this action helps Muslims to set a sign of solidarity to their German society and also to jointly promote openness and peacefulness nationwide.
(German: Dieser Tag alleine reicht nicht aus, um mit unseren Nachbarn und Interessierten in Kontakt zu treten. Doch diese Aktion trägt dazu bei, dass Muslime ein Zeichen der Solidarität zu ihrer deutschen Gesellschaft setzen und auch gemeinsam bundesweit für Offenheit und Friedfertigkeit werben.)

— ZMD, Press release on the 10th Open Mosque Day

We deliberately chose the Day of German Unity because it symbolizes that two countries have come together [sic]. We also want people to come together better across religions.
(German: Wir haben bewusst den Tag der Deutschen Einheit gewählt, weil er symbolisiert, dass zwei Länder zusammen gekommen [sic] sind. Wir möchten, dass auch die Menschen religionsübergreifend besser zusammenfinden.)

— Ayşe Aydin, DİTİB spokeswoman on the 12th Open Mosque Day, WDR

Twelve years ago, the Central Council of Muslims (ZMD) combined the Day of German Unity with an Open Mosque Day. The intention was to show that Muslims also belong to the unity of Germany.
(German: Vor zwölf Jahren hatte der Zentralrat der Muslime (ZMD) den Tag der Deutschen Einheit mit einem Tag der Offenen Moschee verbunden. Die Absicht war, zu zeigen, dass auch die Muslime zur Einheit Deutschlands gehören.)

— Ayyub Axel Köhler, Speech at the Mosque in Rüsselsheim on October 3, 2008, Zentralrat

The managing director of the German Cultural Council, Olaf Zimmermann, spoke of an excellent opportunity to get closer to a supposedly foreign culture and expressed the opinion that Islam is an important part of Germany.

The choice of October 3 as the date for the Open Mosque Day has been criticized. In 2007, for example, the chairman of the CDU parliamentary group in the Hessian state parliament, Christean Wagner, criticized the fact that the Open Mosque Day was being held "on German Unity Day, of all days." The CDU politician called the choice of date "insensitive" and "not very clever".

== Open Mosque Day in other countries ==
=== Switzerland ===
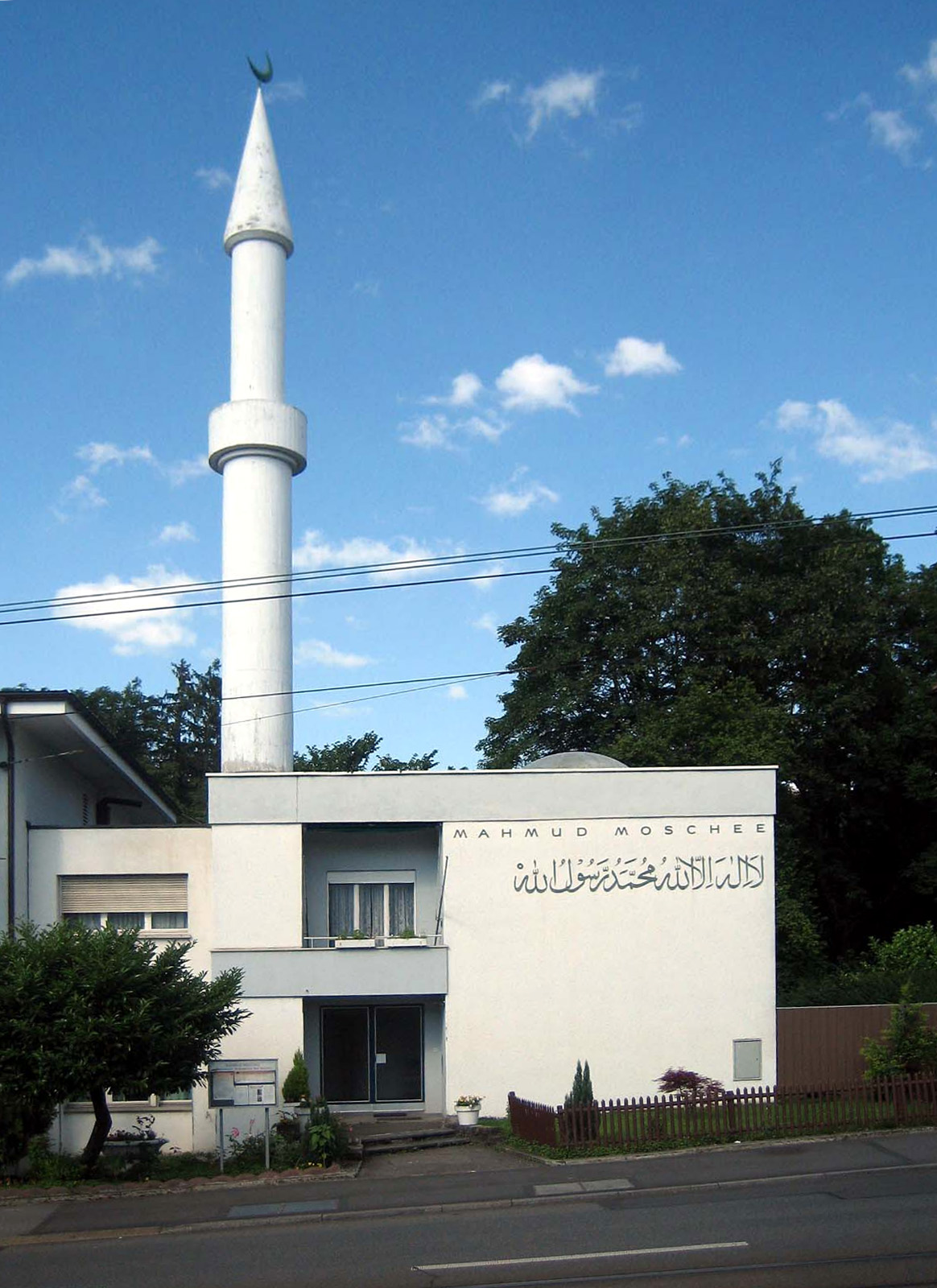
Mahmud Mosque in Zurich, the first mosque in Switzerland

Since 2007, several Muslim umbrella organizations have also organized an Open Mosque Day, including the Federation of Islamic Umbrella Organizations in Switzerland, the Umbrella Association of Islamic Communities in Eastern Switzerland and the Principality of Liechtenstein (DIGO), and the Association of Islamic Organizations in Zurich (VIOZ). The day was also offered for the first time in November 2007 as part of the "Week of Religions" series of events organized by the Interreligious Working Group in Switzerland (IRAS COTIS).

In 2011, the Open Mosque Day was held on September 10. The motto was "Bridges for a common future". In 2014, it was held on November 8.

=== USA ===
In southern California, Annual Open Mosque Day has taken place since 2000.

The US Council of Muslim Organizations has encouraged participation in National Open Mosque Day, which it first organized in October 2016.

The Massachusetts chapter of the Council on American-Islamic Relations organized an Open Mosque Day in the state in 2017 and 2018. The Islamic Council of New England has organized an annual Open Mosque Day among its participating communities, taking place in May or June, since 2019.

In 2018, the Columbus chapter of the Council on American-Islamic Relations organized a Central Ohio Open Mosque Day among seven mosques in Central Ohio.

In 2019, Ahmadiyya Muslim Community USA held an Open Mosque Day in 40 locations across 25 states, which coincided with Ramadan.

=== France ===
The day of the open mosque in France, the Mosquée porte ouverte should take place on September 16, 2011.

=== Great Britain ===
Since 2015, the Muslim umbrella organization The Muslim Council of Britain has held a nationwide open mosque day on February 18 called "Visit my Mosque".

== See also ==
- List of mosques in Germany
- Open house (school)
