= Jean (surname) =

Origin
- Languages: French & English

Other names
- Alternative spelling: French and English: Geen, Genn, Jeanne, Jeans, Jehan, Jenn, Jenne; Chinese: Jian and Zhen

Jean is a French and English surname.

== Origins ==
Jean may be a French surname from the given name Jean (Old French: Jehan), or an English surname which originated as a variant spelling of Jayne or as a toponymic surname referring to Genoa, Italy. Variant spellings of the English and French surnames include Jenn, Jenne, Jeanne, Geen, Genn, and Jeans.

== Statistics ==
People with the surname Jean in France
Decade	Births
1891–1900	1,825
1901–1910	2,583
1911–1920	2,361
1921–1930	3,075
1931–1940	2,750
1941–1950	3,517
1951–1960	3,976
1961–1970	4,032
1971–1980	3,520
1981–1990	3,276
1991–2000	3,078

French government statistics show 33,393 people with the surname Jean born in France from 1891 to 2000 (see table). Statistics compiled by Patrick Hanks on the basis of the 2011 United Kingdom census and the Census of Ireland 2011 found 305 people with the surname Jean on the island of Great Britain and six on the island of Ireland. In the 1881 United Kingdom census there were 130 bearers of the surname, primarily in London. The 2010 United States census found 21,140 people with the surname Jean, making it the 1,703rd-most-common surname in the country. This represented an increase from 15,321 people (2,172nd-most-common) in the 2000 census. In the 2010 census, 22.9% of the bearers of the surname identified as non-Hispanic white (down from 31.7% in the 2000 census), and 70.2% as non-Hispanic black (up from 55.5% in the 2000 census).

== People ==
=== Arts and entertainment ===
==== Film and television ====
- Gloria Jean (1926–2018), American actress and singer
- Jean Constantin (born Constantin Cornel Jean; 1927–2010), Romanian actor and singer
- Rodrigue Jean (born 1957), Canadian film director
- Al Jean (born 1961), American screenwriter and producer
- Vadim Jean (born 1963), English film director

==== Music ====
- Bernard Jean (born 1948), Canadian oboist
- Martin Jean (born 1960), American organist
- Wyclef Jean (born 1969), Haitian musician, music producer, and actor
- Carlos Jean (born 1973), Spanish DJ
- Anik Jean (born 1977), Canadian pop and rock singer, actress and screenwriter
- Misty Jean (born 1980), Haitian singer and model
- BC Jean (born 1987), American singer-songwriter

==== Painting and graphics ====
- Philip Jean (1755–1802), Jersey painter
- Nehemy Jean (1931–2007), Haitian painter and graphic artist
- Eugène Jean (born 1951), Haitian painter
- Jean-Baptiste Jean (1953–2002), Haitian painter
- James Jean (born 1979), Taiwanese-born American visual artist

=== Government and politics ===
- Léon Jean (1901–1986), French politician, member of the National Assembly with the French Section of the Workers' International
- Bernard Jean (politician) (1925–2012), Canadian politician from New Brunswick
- Fritz Jean (born 1953), Haitian economist and politician, former central bank governor
- Christine Jean (born 1956 or 1957), French environmental activist
- Irena Vodopivec Jean, Slovenian economist and banker
- Lorri Jean (born c. 1957), American LGBT rights activist
- Michaëlle Jean (born 1957), 27th Governor General of Canada
- Mireille Jean (born 1960), Canadian politician from Quebec
- Lane Jean (born 1958), American politician from Arkansas
- Brian Jean (born 1963), Canadian politician from Alberta
- Ignatius Jean (fl. 1981–present), Saint Lucian legislator

=== Sport ===
==== Association football ====
- Philippe Jean (footballer) (born 1959), French midfielder
- Earl Jean (born 1971), Saint Lucian striker
- Nesley Jean (born 1985), Bahamian forward
- Lior Jean (born 1986), Israeli defender and midfielder
- Corentin Jean (born 1995), French striker

==== Other ====
- Aurore Jéan (born 1985), French cross-country skier
- Dierry Jean (born 1982), Haitian-born Canadian boxer
- Domingo Jean (born 1969), Dominican baseball pitcher
- Jhohanny Jean (born 1988), Dominican taekwondo practitioner
- Lestar Jean (born 1988), American NFL wide receiver
- Louis-Philippe Jean (born 1984), Canadian strength athlete
- Max Jean (born 1943), French racing driver
- Olivier Jean (born 1984), Canadian short-track speed skater
- Pierre-Alexandre Jean (born 2001), French racing driver
- Walt Jean (1896–1961), American football player and coach

=== Other ===
- Athanase Jean (1861–1932), French country doctor and writer
- Georges Jean (1920–2011), French linguist, semiotician, poet and essayist
- Raymond Jean (1925–2012), French writer
- E. Jean (born 1943), American journalist and advice columnist
- Stella Jean (born 1979), Italian fashion designer
- Michel Jean, Canadian television journalist
