= Jahanara =

Jahanara is a feminine given name that is mainly found in Bangladesh. Notable people with the name include:

- Jahanara of Palanpur (1915–2003), born Joan Falkiner, Australian-born Begum of Palanpur, India
- Jahanara Ahmed, Bangladeshi actress
- Jahanara Alam (born 1993), Bangladeshi cricketer
- Jahanara Arzu (1932–2026), Bangladeshi poet
- Jahanara Begum (1614–1681), Mughal princess
- Jahan Ara Begum Surma (born 1958), Bangladesh Awami League politician
- Jahanara Begum (politician) (1942–2021), Bangladesh Nationalist Party politician
- Jahanara Begum (social worker), Bangladeshi social worker
- Jahanara Hai (born 1939), Pakistani actress
- Jahanara Imam (1929–1994), Bangladeshi writer and activist
- Ananya Jahanara Kabir, Indian literary scholar
- Jahanara Kajjan (1915–1945), also known as Kajjanbai, Indian singer and actress
- Jahanara Khan, Bangladeshi politician
- Jahanara Romney (born 1941), also known as Bonnie Beecher, American activist, singer and actress
- Jahanara Shahnawaz (1896–1979), Bangladeshi politician

== See also ==
- Jahan Ara, a Persian feminine given name
- Jahan Ara (film), a 1964 Indian film
