= Jeannie =

Jeannie may refer to:

- Jeannie (given name), a given name and a list of people with the name
- Jeannie (I Dream of Jeannie), a main character of I Dream of Jeannie
  - Jeannie (TV series), an animated series based on I Dream of Jeannie
  - "Jeannie", the theme song of I Dream of Jeannie
- Jeannie (film), a 1941 British film by Harold French
- "Jeannie" (song), a 1962 song by Danny Williams
- Jeannie River, Queensland, Australia

== See also ==
- Genie (disambiguation)
- Jeanie, a given name
- Jeanny, a given name
