= Jahan Ara =

Jahan Ara (Persian: جهان آرا) or (Urdu: جہاں آرا) is a feminine given name of Persian origin. Notable people with the name include:

== Given name ==
- Jahanara Ahmed, Bangladeshi actress
- Jahanara Alam (born 1993), Bangladeshi cricketer
- Jahanara Arzu (1929–2026), Bangladeshi poet
- Jahanara Begum, multiple people
- Jahanara Hai (born 1939), Pakistani actress
- Jahanara Imam (1929–1994), Bangladeshi writer and political activist
- Jahanara Khan (born 1967), Indian politician
- Jahanara Khan (Bangladesh), Bangladeshi politician
- Jahanara Rob (1928/29–2014), Bangladeshi politician
- Jahanara Shahnawaz (1896–1979), Pakistani politician
- Jahanara Jaipal Singh (1923–2004), Indian politician

== Other ==
- Jahan Ara; 1964 Bollywood film

== See also ==
- Jahan
