= Malla (surname) =

Malla is a Spanish, Nepalese and Kashmiri Pandit surname that may refer to:

Spanish

- Ceferino Giménez Malla (1861–1936), Spanish Roman Catholic catechist
- Coque Malla (born 1970), Spanish musician and actor
- Felip de Malla (1370–1431), Catalan prelate, theologian and scholar
- María Malla (1918–1995), Catalan writer and activist
- Ramon Malla Call (1922–2014), Andorran Bishop

Nepalese/Indian

- Malla (Nepal), a royal dynasty, see List of Malla Kings of Nepal for members
- Ashesh Malla (born 1954), Nepalese playwright and theatre director
- Bikash Malla (born 1986), Nepalese footballer
- Chandra Kanta Devi Malla, Nepalese activist and teacher
- Durga Malla (1913–1944), Indian soldier
- Gauri Malla, Nepalese actress
- Gyanendra Malla (born 1990), Nepalese cricketer
- Hem Bahadur Malla, Nepalese minister
- Jagat Sundar Malla (1882–1952), Nepalese teacher and writer
- Jayanta Malla Baruah, Indian politician
- Kali Bahadur Malla, Nepalese politician
- Kamal P. Malla, Nepalese academic
- Narasingha Malla Deb (1907–1976), Indian politician
- Sampada Malla, Nepalese media personality, writer, film maker and journalist
- Sapana Pradhan Malla, Nepalese Supreme Court Judge
- Saugat Malla, Nepalese film actor
- Sharmila Malla, Nepalese actress
- Sher Malla (born 2002), Nepalese cricketer
- Suresh Malla, Nepalese politician
- Tilak Bam Malla, better known as Parivesh, Nepalese singer
- Thirbam Malla, Nepalese democracy activist
- Swami Maheshwar Nath Malla, a reverred saint from Srinagar, Kashmir.

Other

- Nissanka Malla of Polonnaruwa, 12th century king of Sri Lanka
- Florentina Mallá (1891–1973), Czech composer and pianist
- Jihan Malla, Lebanese television personality and voice actress
- Pasha Malla, Canadian author
