= Jihan =

Jihan or Jihane or may refer to:

== Jihan ==
- Jihan Malla, Lebanese television personality and voice actress
- Jihan El-Tahri, Egyptian writer
- Jihan Wali, Guantanamo detainee
- Jihan Wu, Chinese cryptocurrency entrepreneur and billionaire
- Jihan Zencirli (born 1985), Turkish-American conceptual artist and sculpture artist
- Jihan (born 2004), stage name of Han Ji-hyo from K-Pop group Weeekly
- Eve Jihan Cooper, American rapper, singer, songwriter, and actress (born 1978)

== Jihane ==
- Jihane Almira Chedid (born 2000), Indonesian People's Consultative Assembly Ambassador, actress, fashion model and beauty pageant titleholder
- Jihane Samlal (born 1983), Moroccan slalom canoer

== See also ==
- Jehan
- Jehanne (disambiguation)
- Jean (male given name)
- Jahan (name)
