= Jeanne =

Jeanne may refer to:

== Places ==
- Jeanne (crater), on Venus

== People ==
- Jeanne (given name)
- Jeanne B. (pen name for Mirha-Soleil Ross), Canadian activist and artist
- Jeanne Baret (1740–1807), French explorer, naturalist, and botanist
- Joan of Arc (Jeanne d'Arc, c.1412–1431), French folk heroine and saint
- Jeanne Devos (religious sister)
- Jeanne Devos (photographer)
- Joan of Flanders, Countess of Montfort (1295–1374)
- Joan of Penthièvre (1319–1384)
- Ruth Stuber Jeanne (1910–2004), American marimbist, percussionist, violinist, and arranger
- Jeanne de Navarre (disambiguation), multiple people
- Jeanne Landre (1874–1936), French journalist, critic and novelist
- Jeanne Viard (born 2003), French singer sometimes known mononymously as Jeanne
- Leon Jeanne (born 1980), Welsh footballer

=== Fictional characters ===
- Jeanne, a character from the Bayonetta series of video games

== Arts and entertainment ==
- Jeanne (1934 film), a French drama film
- Jeanne, also known as Joan of Arc, a 2019 French drama film
- Jeanne, an 1844 novel by George Sand
- "Jeanne" (Laurent Voulzy song), 2011
- Jeanne (Georges Brassens song), 1962
- Jeanne (album), a 2022 album by Natasha St-Pier
- "Jeanne", a song by Rosalía from Lux, 2025

== Other uses ==
- Tropical Storm Jeanne (disambiguation)

== See also ==
- Joan (disambiguation)
- Joanna
- Joanne (disambiguation)
- Jean (disambiguation)
- Jehanne (disambiguation)
- Gene (disambiguation)
