= Joan of France =

Jeanne or Joan of France may refer to:

- Jeanne III, Countess of Burgundy (1308–1349), a princess of France
- Joan II of Navarre (1312–1349), a princess of France
- Jeanne of Valois, Queen of Navarre (1343–1373), a princess of France
- Joan of Valois (1351–1371), a princess of France
- Joan of France, Duchess of Brittany, a princess of France
- Jehanne la Pucelle d'Ay de Domremy (1412–1431), a peasant, Saint Joan of Arc, Patron Saint of France
- Joan of France, Duchess of Bourbon (1435–1482), a princess of France
- Joan of France, Duchess of Berry (1464–1505), Saint Joan of Valois, a princess of France, Queen of France

== See also ==
- Joan (disambiguation)
- Jeanne (disambiguation)
- Jehanne (disambiguation)
