= List of theatres in Nepal =

This is a partial list of professional and semi-professional theaters in Nepal.

Name	City	Province	Specialty
Aarohan Gurukul	Kathmandu (Anamnagar)	Bagmati	
Sarwanam Theatre Group	Kathmandu (Anamnagar)	Bagmati	
Mandala Theatre Nepal	Kathmandu (Thapagau)	Bagmati	
Pokhara Theatre	Pokhara (Gairapatan)	Gandaki	
Theatre Village Nepal	Lalitpur (Mahalaxmisthan)	Bagmati	
One World Theatre	Kathmandu	Bagmati	English Language
Theatre Mall Nepal	Kathmandu (Kirtipur)	Bagmati	
Shailee Theatre Nepal	Kathmandu (Ratopul)	Bagmati	
Kausi Theater	Kathmandu (Teku)	Bagmati	
Shilpee Theatre Nepal	Kathmandu (Battisputali)	Bagmati	
Studio Theatre	Kathmandu (Tilganga)	Bagmati	
Purano Ghar Theatre	Kathmandu (Sinamangal)	Bagmati	
Ojas Theatre & Film Studio	Kathmandu (Ratopul)	Bagmati	
Kunja Theatre	Kathmandu (Anamnagar)	Bagmati	
