= Sampada Malla =

Sampada Malla सम्पदा मल्ल
- Born: Kathmandu, Nepal
- Occupations: Writer; Film maker Journalist
- Known for: VOW College Women Award 2007

Sampada Malla (Nepali: सम्पदा मल्ल) is a Nepalese media personality, writer, film maker and journalist working in Nepal and India. She serves as the board director and creative director of Sarwanam Theatre Group, the leading theatre group of Nepal. She is the recipient of "Travel Writer of the Year" (Nepal Tourism Board, 2005) and "VOW College Women Award", (VOW Magazine, 2007). She was featured as one of Nepal's eligible bachelorettes by enasha.com in 2008, a popular web magazine. She received her master's degree in journalism and mass communication from Punjab Technical University, India. She is an alumna of Asian Academy of Film and Television, India, with a master diploma in cinema.

Malla published her debut Nepali fiction book, Anayas Ek Din (Suddenly One Day) at the age of 17, a collection of stories which featured various social-based issues, published in leading Nepali newspapers and magazines like Kantipur Daily, Annapurna Post and Gorakhapatra. Renowned Nepali literary figures such as Dhruba Chandra Gautam and Dr. Govinda Raj Bhattarai inaugurated the book, and gave positive reviews about the book and the writer. The book received critical acclaim from various national media. She was chosen among the five Nepali writers to represent Nepal at the "SAARC Literature Festival" at Park Village, Kathmandu.

Malla has made documentaries for The Asia Foundation and Save the Children Norway focusing on the role of street theatre in creating awareness in Nepal. She serves as the board of management team of Sarwanam Dramatic Art Centre, the first of its kind in Nepal which houses a theatre auditorium, art gallery, cafeteria and a workshop hall. The Art Centre is one of the respected and popular art places of Kathmandu, Nepal. She is the President of Women in Animation, Nepal Chapter

== Early life ==
Sampada Malla was born in Kathmandu, Nepal, to Ashesh Malla, a Nepalese theatre personality and Dr. Sabitri Malla Kakshapati. She is the descendant of the Malla King of Bhaktapur, whose legacy ended when the Shahs attacked the then kingdom, leading them to flee. Her grandfather, Khagendra Kumar Pradhananga is a literary figure of Nepal.

Apart from attending her school in Galaxy Public School, Kathmandu, she worked as a child artist in National TV commercials and radio drama shows in Radio Nepal. She gave her voice to many documentaries made by Redbarnna, Nepal and Save the Children, Nepal. At 13, she began writing socio-based articles in various popular national dailies like Kantipur Daily, The Himalayan Times, The Kathmandu Post and pursued her career as a freelance journalist working in various popular national magazines such as: Wave, ECS, Spaces, Infotiser, and Cybersansar.com.

== Career ==
After completing her master's degree, she shifted her base to Mumbai, where she worked as an associate screenplay writer in popular shows like Yeh Rishta Kya Kehlata Hai (Star Plus), Bhagyavidhata (Color TV), Sasural Simar Ka (Color TV), Saubhagyavati Bhava (Life OK), Navya (Star Plus), Uttaran (Color TV), and Parvarish (Sony TV). She worked as a screenplay writer in a popular soap, Badalte Rishtey telecasted in ETV Kannada, Ishq ka Rang Safed (Colors TV) and Sankha Sindura telecasted in Tarang TV, Odisa.

In 2013, Malla wrote 30-minute Nepali film Pratibimba which was directed by Ashok Yadav and produced by 360 Degree Mountain Films. It was premiered in the prestigious Eka Deshma Festival amidst a houseful audience in QFX Cinema Hall, Kathmandu.

Currently, she is working on her fictional book about the Maoist revolution detailing effects on the people of Nepal. She is also the screenplay writer of Ishq Ka Rang Safed, a TV series telecasted in Colors TV. She is the Creative Producer of a Hindi feature film, Kerry On Kutton. She has recently written a short film Nepali script entitled Chyanti directed by International award-winning director Veemsen Lama. She is the script writer for a famous Nepali political TV Series Singha Durbar.

In 2014, she initiated Drishyansha, a nationwide Nepali Cell Phone Cinema Competition in Nepal. The festival was hugely acclaimed and saw more than 600 entries from Nepal and abroad. Her debut Nepali feature film, Kathaputali as a writer and executive producer is releasing soon worldwide.
