= Jeanne (given name) =

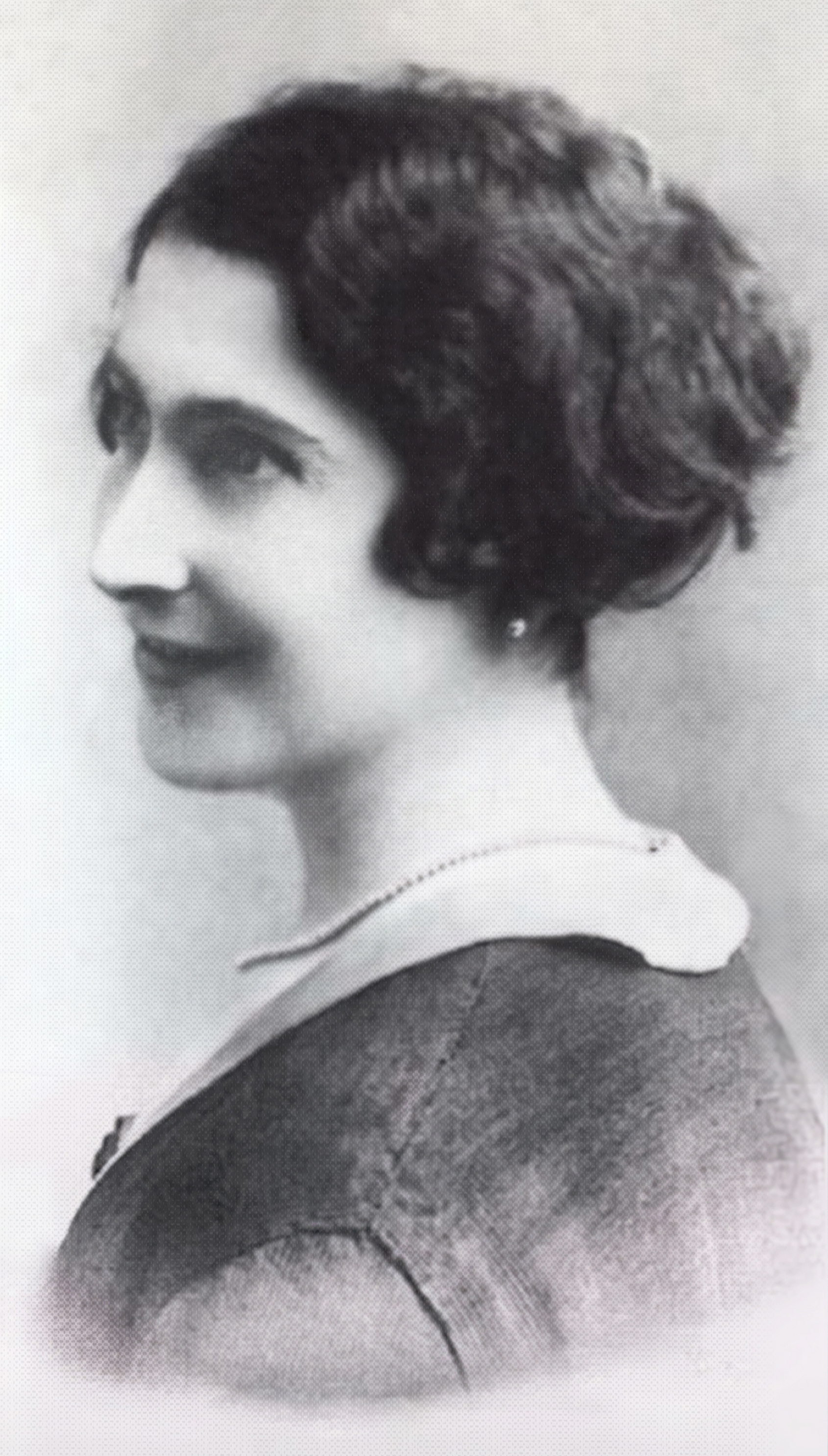
- Jeanne Calment
- Pronunciation: French: [ʒan]
- Gender: Female

Origin
- Origin: French

Other names
- Variant forms: Jeannie, Jenny, Jeannette
- Related names: Jean, Joan, Joanna, Jane, Jenny, Jeannie, Jeannette Jeane

Jeanne is a French personal name which is the feminine form of the male given name Jean (the French equivalent of John). It is equivalent to the English Joan, Jane, Jean and several historical figures in English named Joanna. The names derive from the Old French name Jehanne.

== Historical people whose name includes Jeanne ==
- Queen Jeanne I of Navarre
- Queen Jeanne II of Navarre
- Queen Jeanne III of Navarre, also called Jeanne d'Albret
- Jeanne de Flandre (Joan of Flanders, Countess of Montfort in English)
- Jeanne de Dreux, also called Jeanne de Penthièvre (Joanna of Dreux in English)
- Jeanne de Bar, Countess of Marle and Soissons
- Jeanne of Angoulême
- Queen Jeanne II of Naples (Joanna II of Naples)
- Jeanne de Laval
- Jeanne Du Barry, mistress of King Louis XV
- Several princesses of France, Navarre, and Valois

== People with the given name Jeanne ==
- Jeanne Auclair (1924–2026), Canadian artist
- Jeanne Basone (born 1963), American professional wrestler, actress, model, and stuntwoman
- Jeanne Behrend (1911–1988), American pianist, musicologist, music educator, and composer
- Jeanne de Bellem (1732/34–fl. 1790), Belgian writer and revolutionary
- Jeanne Bérangère (1864–1938), French actress
- Jeanne Black (1937–2014), American country music singer
- Jeanne Milliken Bonds (born 1962), American politician
- Jeanne Calment (1875–1997), French woman with the longest confirmed lifespan in history
- Jeanne C. Smith Carr (1825–1903), American educator, author
- Jeanne Carstensen, American journalist and author
- Jeanne Cooper (1928–2013), American actress
- Jeanne Cordova (1948–2016), American trailblazer
- Jeanne Crain (1925–2003), American actress
- Jeanne Dumée (1660–1706), French astronomer
- Jeanne Dunning (born 1960), American photographer
- Jeanne de Flandreysy (1874–1959), French author and literary critic.
- Jeanne Edwards (1928–2011), American politician
- Jeanne Garvey, American politician
- Jeanne Guiot (1889–1963), French engineer specialising in metallurgy, women's rights campainer
- Jeanne Halbwachs (1890–1980), French pacifist, feminist and socialist
- Jeanne-Mathilde Herbelin (1818–1904), French portrait miniaturist
- Jeanne Hoff (1938–2023), American psychiatrist
- Jeanne Jugan (1792–1879), French nun and saint
- Jeanne Lafortune, Canadian economist
- Marie Sophie Jeanne Laisné (born 1870; year of death unknown), French operatic soprano
- Jeanne Landry (1922–2011), Canadian composer, pianist and teacher
- Jeanne Le Ber, French Canadian recluse
- Jeanne Leblanc (born 1978), Canadian film director and screenwriter
- Jeanne Macherez (1852–1930), French heroine during the World War I; Mayor of Soissons
- Jeanne de Montagnac (1882–1966), French singer and salonnière
- Jeanne Moreau (1928–2017), French actress, screenwriter and director
- Jeanne Pallier (1863 or 1864–1939), French aviator, founder of le Club Féminine Automobile to provide female drivers for the ambulances near the Front in the First World War.
- Jeanne Audrey Powers, leader within The United Methodist Church, an advocate for women and LGBTQ+ people in the church, and one of the first women ordained in the denomination
- Jeanne Quinault (1699–1783), French actress, salonist and playwright
- Jeanne de La Saulcée (died 1559), French publisher, printer and bookseller
- Jeanne Sauvé (1922–1993), Canadian politician
- Jeanne Shaheen (born 1947), American politician
- Jeanne de Tramcourt (1875–1952), French mistress of Prince Wilhelm of Sweden
- Jeanne Tremsal (born 1977), German-French actress and producer
- Jeanne Tripplehorn (born 1963), American actress
- Jeanne Van Calck (1897–1906), Belgian child who was murdered
- Jeanne Murray Vanderbilt (1919–2013), American socialite
- Jeanne Viard (born 2003), French singer
- Jeanne Villepreux-Power, (1794–1871), French marine biologist
- Jeanne Fox Weinmann (1874–1962), American socialite, historian, and clubwoman
- Laura Jeanne Reese Witherspoon (born 1976), American actress
- Jeanne You (born 1978), South Korean pianist

== Fictional people named Jeanne ==
- Jeanne, one of the two main characters in Bernardo Bertolucci's film Last Tango in Paris, played by Maria Schneider
- Dr. Jeanne Benoit, subject of an undercover mission (and potential romantic interest) of Special Agent Tony DiNozzo in the TV show NCIS, played by Scottie Thompson
- Jeanne, one of the primary characters of the video game series Bayonetta
- Jeanne, one of the main characters alter egos as Kaitou Jeanne who is the reincarnation of Joan de Arc in the TV show Kaitou Jeanne
- Jeanne, the main character in Jeanne d'Arc the video game
- Jeanne, one of the primary characters in the TV show The Case Study of Vanitas

== Other ==
- Jeanne (crater), a crater on Venus
- There have been three hurricanes called Hurricane Jeanne: in 1980, 1998 and 2004

== See also ==
- Jehanne (disambiguation)
- Joan of Arc (Jeanne d'Arc in French)
