= Achille Allier =

French writer, art critic and archaeologist (1807-1836)

Archille Allier
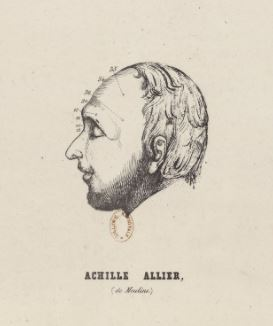
- Born: 1807; Montluçon, Allier, France
- Died: 3 April 1836 (aged 28–29); Bourbon-l'Archambault, Allier

Achille Allier (1807 in Montluçon, Allier – 3 April 1836 in Bourbon-l'Archambault, Allier was a French writer, art critic and archaeologist.

== Biography ==
The son of a grocer, Allier went to Paris to study law, and earned a license to practice which did not however dissuade him from complaining about the 'decaying morals' that he felt were rampant in the capital. He went back to the provinces to settle in Bourbon-l'Archambault.

Victor Hugo, next to the Orleans royal family, encouraged Achille Allier to contribute with the renewal of the French provinces' interest. Both saw on it an opportunity to oppose the fragmentation of the French departments, and to contest the Jacobinism.

Allier was responsible for the restoration of the chapel of the church at Bourbon. He was also the illustrator, designer and founder-director of the monthly magazine Art en Province (Art in the provinces), founded by him in 1835.

Allier died in 1836 from a stroke.

== Honors ==
A plaque was fixed at his birthplace in Montluçon, 18 rue Notre-Dame. In Bourbon-l'Archambault, a street is also named after him, and a bust by the sculptor Auguste Préault was erected in his memory in the town's churchyard in time for a memorial service held on 15 September 1836. Préault had met the writer through a mutual friend, Célestin Nanteuil, and offered his services for the commission, which was paid for by public subscription and a 300 franc payment by the ministry of the interior.

The Achille Allier Prize was created in 1991, to recognise scholarly works about the Allier department and the Bourbonnais region; it is awarded yearly.

== Works ==
- Esquisses bourbonnaises, 1831, with Allier's hand illustrations (rural life scenes).
- La vie et les miracles, (1836), large colored drawing dedicated to Saint Pourçain (a chromolithograph of this work, by Desrosiers, in 1855, won a prize at the Exposition Universelle).
- A two-volume publication of the original typography entitled L'Ancien Bourbonnais that granted the actual celebrity of Achille Allier. The first volume dates of 1833, under the direct conduction of the author whilst the second volume, dated of 1837 was developed by his historian friend, Adolphe Michel, from numerous notes left by the dead Achille Allier.

== Bibliography ==
- Joseph Viple, Achille Allier, Moulins, Crépin-Leblond, 1936, 31 p.
- Léon Cote, Le romantisme en province. Achille Allier, historien, conteur, imagier bourbonnais (1807-1836), Moulins, 1942, xv-408 p. (tése).
