= Jeanie =

Jeanie is a feminine given name in the English language.

== People with the given name ==
- Jeanie Buss, president of the Los Angeles Lakers
- Jeanie Deans (disambiguation)
- Jeanie Dicks (1893–1980), led the first permanent electrification of Winchester Cathedral in 1934
- Jeanie Johnson
- Jeanie Lee, known as Gin Lee, Malaysian singer
- Jeanie MacPherson
- Jeanie Tracy

== Fictional characters ==
- Jeanie Deans, the main character of the early 19th century novel The Heart of Midlothian written by Sir Walter Scott
- Jeanie Humphrey-Dawson, a character in the 1994 American television comedy film Revenge of the Nerds IV: Nerds in Love

== Other uses ==
- Aechmea 'Jeanie', a flowering plant cultivar
- Jeanie (interbank network), the first shared ATM network in the United States

== See also ==
- Jean (disambiguation)
- Jeannie (given name)
