= Jean =

Jean may refer to:

== People ==
- Jean (female given name)
- Jean (male given name)
- Jean (surname)

=== Fictional characters ===
- Jean Grey, Marvel Comics character
- Jean Valjean, character in novel Les Misérables and its adaptations
- Jean Pierre Polnareff, character from JoJo's Bizarre Adventure
- Jean Luc Picard, character from Star Trek Next Generation

== Places ==
- Jean, Nevada, United States; a town
- Jean, Oregon, United States

== Entertainment ==
- Jean (dog), a female collie in silent films
- "Jean" (song) (1969), by Rod McKuen, also recorded by Oliver
- Jean Seberg (musical), a 1983 musical by Marvin Hamlisch
- Jean (film), a biopic on Jean-Michel Basquiat starring Kid Cudi

== Other uses ==
- JEAN (programming language)
- USS Jean (ID-1308), American cargo ship c. 1918
- Sternwheeler Jean, a 1938 paddleboat of the Willamette River

== See also ==
- Jehan
- Gene (disambiguation)
- Jeanne (disambiguation)
- Jehanne (disambiguation)
- Jeans (disambiguation)
- John (disambiguation)
- Valjean (disambiguation)
