= Hôtel de Ville, Montluçon =

Town hall in Montluçon, France

Hôtel de Ville
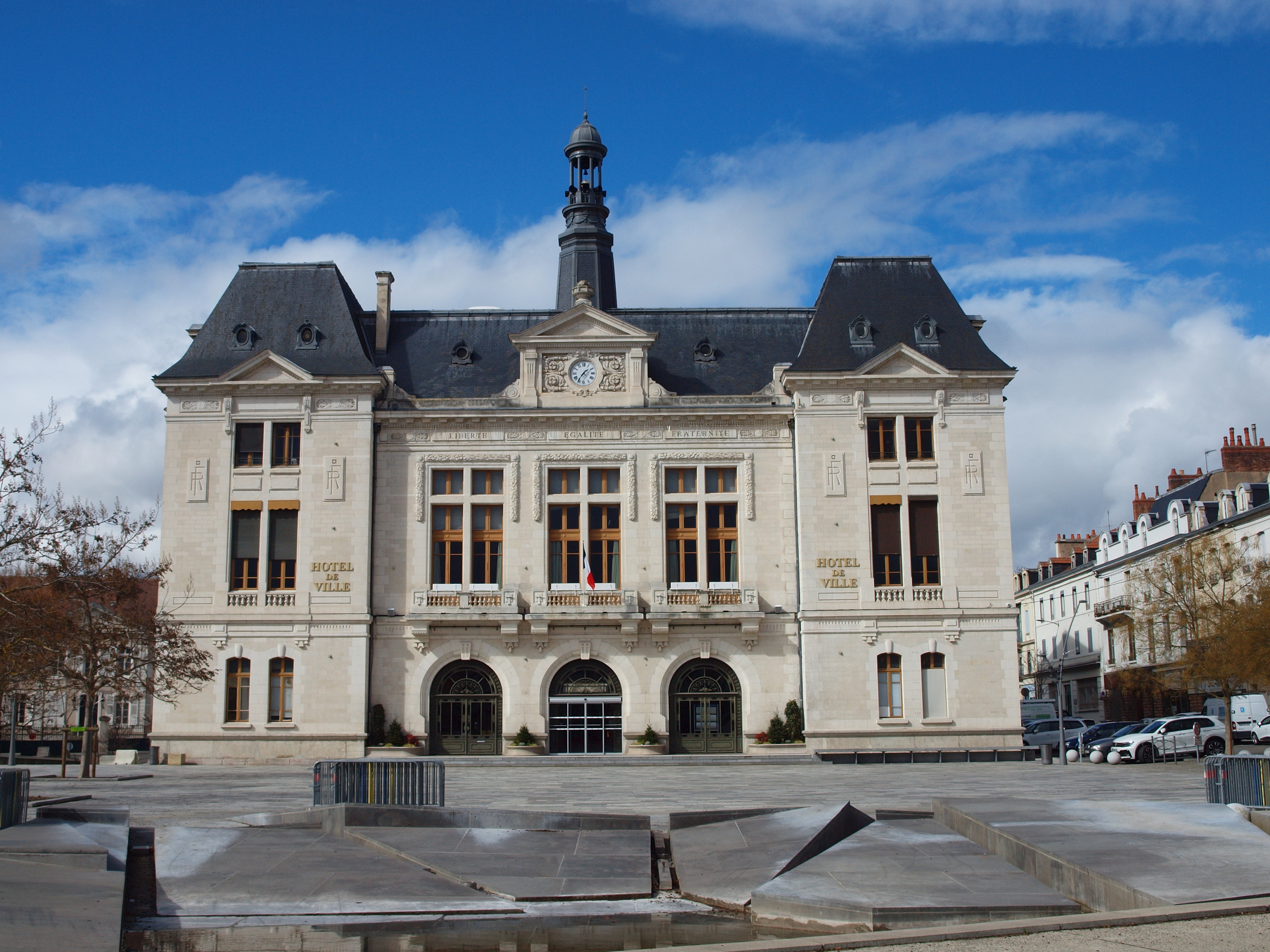
- The main frontage of the Hôtel de Ville in March 2019
- Interactive map of the Hôtel de Ville area

General information
- Type: City hall
- Architectural style: Neoclassical style
- Location: Montluçon, France
- Coordinates: 46.3399°N 2.6067°E
- Completed: 1912

Design and construction
- Architect: Gilbert Talbourdeau

The Hôtel de Ville (French pronunciation: [otɛl də vil], City Hall) is a municipal building in Montluçon, Allier, in central France, standing on Place Jean-Jaurès.

== History ==
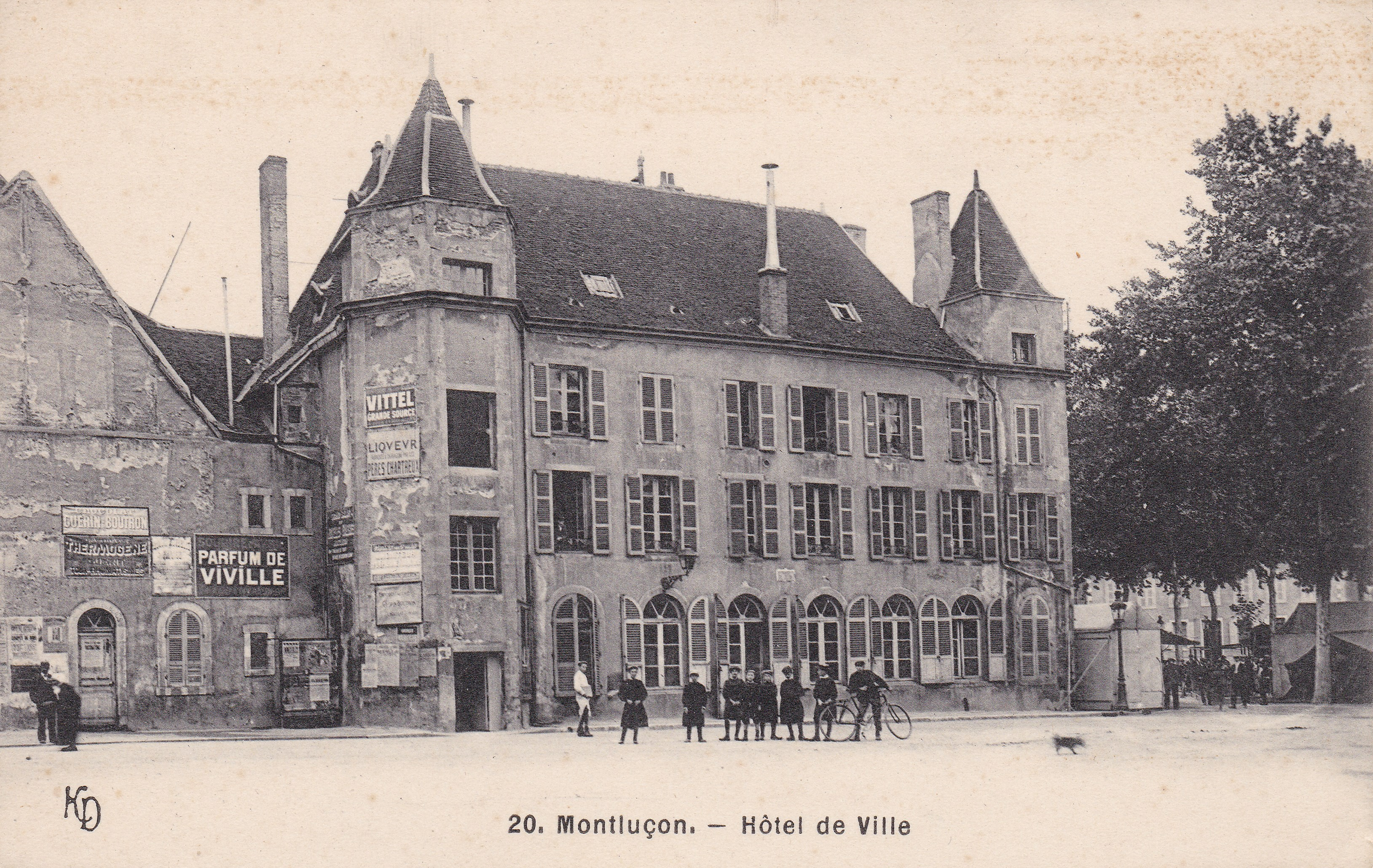
The old town hall

Under the Ancien régime, the aldermen met a room in the Château of the Dukes of Bourbon but, in the early 19th century, the new town council decided to acquire a dedicated building. The building they selected was the old Couvent des Ursulines (Convent of the Ursulines). The convent had been established by two Ursuline nuns, with consent from Louis XIV and the Bishop of Bourges, in the 17th century. During the French Revolution, the convent was seized by the state and the nuns were driven out. The council acquired the building for municipal use in 1812. However, by the late 19th century, it was in a dilapidated state and there were concerns over the structural integrity of the chapel which had been used as a theatre.

In 1908, following significant population growth, the council led by the mayor, Paul Constans, proposed demolishing the old convent and erecting a combined town hall and theatre on the same site. Construction of the new building started in 1910. It was designed by Gilbert Talbourdeau in the neoclassical style, built in ashlar stone and was officially opened in 1912.

The building was laid out in two parts with the theatre to the west and the town hall to the east. Although the structures were adjoining, a solid partition wall was erected separating them. The design for the town hall involved a symmetrical main frontage of five bays facing onto what is now Place Jean-Jaurès, with the end bays projected forward as pavilions. The central section of three bays featured three round headed openings with archivolts, voussoirs and keystones on the ground floor. The first floor was fenestrated by three mullioned and transomed windows with ornate hood moulds and balustrades. At roof level, there was an entablature, a cornice and a clock, which was flanked by pilasters supporting a pediment, above the central bay. Behind the clock, there was an hexagonal belfry. The outer bays were fenestrated by pairs of narrow segmental headed windows on the ground floor and by pairs of narrow casement windows on the first floor and at attic level. The end bays were surmounted by steep châteauesque roofs.

Internally, the principal rooms included the Salle des Fêtes (ballroom), which featured a series of cast iron columns supporting a glass roof. It was decorated by a large mural, painted by the Barberis brothers, depicting the Berry Canal with the Château of the Dukes of Bourbon in the background. Other rooms included the Salle du Conseil Municipal (council chamber) and the Salle des Mariages (wedding room).

Following the liberation of the town by the French Forces of the Interior (FFI) on 25 August 1944, during the Second World War, local members of the FFI formed a parade in front of the town hall. A ceremony was subsequently held there, on 17 September 1944, in memory of 42 local members of the FFI, who had been executed by German troops the previous month.

In January 2024, the town hall closed to facilitate a major restoration project: the programme of works was scheduled to involve the removal of a mezzanine floor which had been installed in the ballroom in the 1960s. It also involved the restoration of the murals by a team from the workshop of the picture restorer, Marc Philippe.
