= Blue Jeans (disambiguation) =

Blue Jeans or jeans usually means jeans; a type of pants, typically made from denim or dungaree cloth.

Blue Jeans may also refer to:

== Films ==
- Blue Jeans (1917 film), based on the 1890 play
- Blue Jeans (1975 film) starring Gloria Guida

== Songs ==
- "Blue Jeans" (Blur song)
- "Blue Jeans" (1920s song)
- "Blue Jeans" (Sqeezer song)
- "Blue Jeans" (Skyhooks song), 1976
- "Blue Jeans" (Ladytron song)
- "Blue Jeans" (Lana Del Rey song)
- "Blue Jeans", a 2002 song by Yasmeen Sulieman
- "Blue Jeans", a 2015 song by Chris Brown from Royalty
- "Blue Jeans", a 2021 song by Old Dominion from Time, Tequila & Therapy

== Other ==
- Blue Jeans (play), an 1890 American play by Joseph Arthur
- BlueJeans Network, a video-conferencing system
- The Blue Jeans, a Japanese instrumental rock group formed in 1962

== See also ==
- "Blue Jean Blues" – a 1975 song by ZZ Top from the album Fandango!
- "Blue Jean", a 1984 song by David Bowie
- Bob B. Soxx & the Blue Jeans
- "Forever in Blue Jeans", a 1979 a song by Neil Diamond
- Jeans (disambiguation)
