= Mafla =

Mafla is a surname. Notable people with the surname include:

- Carina Vance Mafla (born 1977), Ecuadorian politician
- Christian Mafla (born 1993), Colombian footballer
- Edison Mafla (born 1974), Colombian footballer
- Víctor Hugo Mafla (born 1974), Colombian footballer

== See also ==
- Malla (surname)
