= Jeannie (given name) =

Female given name

- Gender: Female

Other names
- Related names: Jeanne

Jeannie is a feminine name and a petform of Jeanne, a variant form of Jechonan (יוחנן). It is ultimately originated from the Hebrew masculine name (יְהוֹחָנָן) Jehohanan or (יוֹחָנָן) Yohanan meaning 'God is gracious'. It may be a nickname of Jeannette.

Women with the given name include:

- Jeannie Baker (born 1950), English author and illustrator of children's picture books
- Jeannie Berlin (born 1949), American actress and screenwriter
- Jeannie Blaylock, American television journalist and news anchor
- Jeannie Carson (born 1928), English-born retired comedian and actress
- Jeannie Chan (born 1989), Hong Kong actress and model
- Jeannie Darneille (born 1949), American politician
- Jeannie Drake, Baroness Drake (born 1948), British trade unionist
- Jeannie Epper (born 1941), American stuntperson and actress
- Jeannie Gunn (1870–1961), Australian novelist and teacher
- Jeannie Haddaway-Riccio (born 1977), American politician
- Jeannie Hsieh (born 1974), Taiwanese singer-songwriter
- Jeannie Leavitt (born c. 1967), United States Air Force officer, first female Air Force fighter pilot, and first woman to command an Air Force combat fighter wing
- Jeannie Cho Lee, Hong Kong–based, Korean-American wine critic, author, journalist, consultant, wine educator and Master of Wine
- Jeannie Lockett (1847–1890), Australian schoolteacher and writer
- Jeannie Longo (born 1958), French racing cyclist
- Jeannie Mah (born 1952), Canadian ceramic artist
- Jeannie Mai (born 1979), American fashion expert and television personality
- Jeannie Marie-Jewell (born 1961), Canadian politician
- Jeannie McDaniel, American politician elected to the Oklahoma House of Representatives in 2004
- Jeannie Mills (1939–1980), American murder victim
- Jeannie Ng (born 1998), better known by her stage name Kayan9896, Hong Kong singer
- Jeannie Ortega (born 1986), American Christian singer, songwriter, dancer and actress
- Jeannie Pepper (born 1958), American pornographic actress
- Jeannie C. Riley (born 1945), American country music and gospel singer
- Jeannie Robertson (1908–1975), Scottish folk singer
- Jeannie Sandoval (born 1965), Filipino politician
- Jeannie Seely (born 1940), American country music singer
- Jeannie Suk (born 1973), Harvard Law School professor
- Jeannie Tirado, American voice actress
- Jeannie Ugyuk, Canadian politician elected to the Legislative Assembly of Nunavut in 2010

Fictional characters with the name include:

- Jeannie Hopkirk, a character in the British paranormal television series Randall and Hopkirk (deceased)

== See also ==
- Jeanie
- Jeanny
- Jenny
