= Jeanny =

Jeanny is a given name. Notable people with the name include:

- Jeanny Canby (1929–2007), American archaeologist and scholar
- Jeanny Dom (born 1954), Luxembourgian table tennis player
- Jeanny Marc (born 1950), French National Assembly member
- Jeanny Yao, Canadian biochemist, technology entrepreneur and environmentalist; jointly identified a bacteria that breaks down phthalates and co-founded Novoloop

== See also ==
- "Jeanny" (song), a 1985 song by the Austrian musician Falco
- Jean (disambiguation)
- Jenny (disambiguation)
