= Abdur Rob Boga Mia =

Member of the Constituent Assembly

Personal details
- Born: Syed Fazle Elahi Abdur Rob; 31 October 1916 Rangpur
- Died: 25 February 1973 (aged 56)
- Party: Bangladesh Awami League
- Spouse: Jahanara Rob
- Occupation: Politician

Abdur Rob Boga Mia (October 31, 1916 – February 25, 1973) was a politician of the Awami League and a member of the Constituent Assembly of Bangladesh. He played a key role as an organizer of the Bangladesh Liberation War in Pabna District.

== Early life ==
Mia was born on October 31, 1916, in the city of Rangpur, where his father was stationed for work. His full name was Syed Fazle Elahi Abdur Rob. His father was Sabkat Hossain, and his mother was Mohitun Nesa. Sabkat Hossain was a divisional inspector under the British India government. Boga Mia later pursued his education in Kolkata, where he developed close ties with Bengali politicians and had briefly worked at Tata Group. After the Partition of India in 1947, he moved to his ancestral home in Pabna District and became involved in business.

== Political career ==
In 1953, when the Pabna district branch of the Awami League was formed, Mia was appointed its general secretary. In the 1962 National Assembly elections, he managed the campaign for Amjad Hossain. In the 1970 Pakistani general election, he was elected as a Member of the Provincial Assembly (MPA) from Pabna Sadar as an Awami League candidate. After the death of Amjad Hossain, the then-president of the Pabna district Awami League, on April 6, 1971, Boga Mia took over the leadership.

During the Bangladesh Liberation War in 1971, a nine-member committee was formed in Pabna, and Boga Mia was one of its members. On December 18, when Pabna was declared a liberated zone, he was present at the flag-raising ceremony.

== Personal life ==
Boga Mia was married to Jahanara Rob, who later served as a member of the reserved women's seat in the First National Parliament of Bangladesh. On February 25, 1973, he died in a road accident.
