= Jehan =

Jehan is a predominantly male given name. It is the old orthography of Jean in Old French, and is rarely given anymore. It is also a variant of the Persian name Jahan in some South Asian languages.

== People with the given name Jehan ==
- Jehan Adam (15th century), French mathematician
- Jehan Alain (1911–1940), French organist and composer
- Jahanara Begum (1614–1681), Mughal (Indian) royalty sometimes known as Jehan Begum
- Jehan Cauvin (1509–1564), French theologian and founder of Calvinism better known as John Calvin
- Jehan Cousin the Younger (circa 1522–1595), French artist
- Jehan Daruvala (born 1998), Indian racing driver
- Jehan de Lescurel (died 1304), medieval poet and composer also known as Jehannot de l'Escurel
- Jehan de Vezelay, birth name of Johannes of Jerusalem (1042–1119), French abbot
- Jehan de Waurin (circa 1400–1474), French chronicler
- Jehan Fresneau (fl. ca. 1468–1505), French composer
- Jehan Mubarak (born 1981), American-born Sri Lankan cricketer
- Jehan Rictus (1867–1933), French poet
- Jehan Sadat (1933–2021), first lady of Egypt
- Jehan Ara Saeed (1926–2007), Pakistani radio newsreader
- Jehan Tabourot (1520–1595), Catholic priest better known by his pen name Thoinot Arbeau
- Jehan Titelouze (c. 1562/63–1633), French organist and composer
- Jehan Georges Vibert (1840–1902), French academic painter
- Jehan Wali (21st century), Pakistani extrajudicial prisoner of the United States

=== Fictional character ===
- Jehan Frollo, a character in Victor Hugo's The Hunchback of Notre-Dame

== People with the surname Jehan ==
- Noor Jehan (1926–2000), Pakistani film singer
- Sonya Jehan (born 1980), Franco-Pakistani actress

== People with the nickname Jehan ==
- Jehan (singer) (born 1957), French songwriter and singer
- Jean (Jehan) Prouvaire, a character in Victor Hugo's novel Les Misérables

== See also ==
- Jehanne (disambiguation)
- Jean (male given name)
- Jahan (name)
- Jihan
