= Jahanara Begum (disambiguation) =

Jahanara Begum (1614–1681) was a Mughal princess.

Jahanara Begum may also refer to:

- Jahan Ara Begum Surma (born 1958), Bangladesh Awami League politician
- Jahanara Begum (politician) (1942–2021), Bangladesh Nationalist Party politician
- Jahanara Begum (social worker), Bangladeshi social worker
