= Athanase Jean =

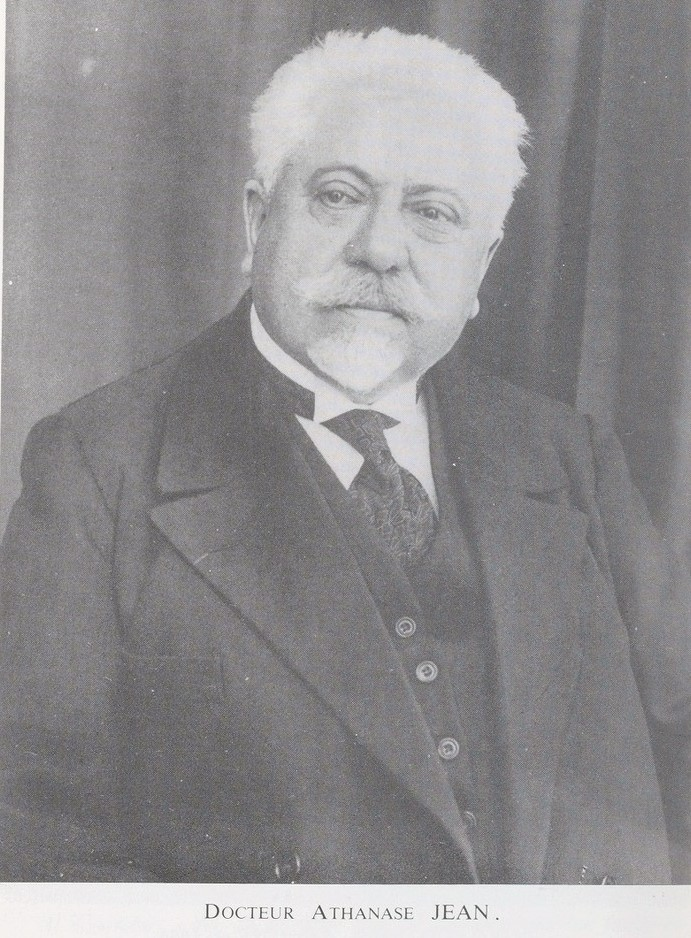

Athanase Jean (born 1861 in Saint-Césaire, died 1932 at Rouffiac, Charente-Maritime) was a French medical doctor and writer.

== Life ==
Athanase Jean, better known by the name of Doctor Jean, was born on 24 November 1861 at Saint-Cesaire, Charente-Maritime, into a family of winemakers. Having done well at his studies undertaken in Pons, Saintes and Rochefort and ending up specialising in naval health, he found himself posted to Guyana for his military service. It was there that he began practising medicine.

On his return to France, he was able to complete his university degree. He was subsequently asked by the residents of Rouffiac to become their local doctor, a post that he kept until his death on 17 February 1932.

An enthusiastic man and curious about everything, he kept his peasant roots at heart and showed a talent for speaking and writing about the Saintonge using the local dialect. This resulted in several works, the most relevant and most popular of which was undoubtedly "La Mérine à Nastasie", a comedy in three acts in Saintongeais, and published under the pseudonym of Yan San Acer (Saint-Acer being the Saintonge name of his birthplace, Saint-Césaire ). It was performed for the first time on 25 May 1902 at the Chateau de Mauleon in Rouffiac. On 4 December of the same year it made its début in Paris at the Salle Lancry. It has been reprised on various occasions throughout the twentieth century.

As well as working tirelessly as doctor, he also took part in local government serving on the municipal council and serving as mayor and councillor for the town of Pons. He worked to promote the revival of the local vineyard after its destruction by phylloxera, and was instrumental in having a railway station built to serve the village using the receipts from the first performance of his play "La Mérine à Nastasie". He was also responsible for bringing the telephone to the commune.

Like Barthélemy Gautier, well known for his sketches of peasant life, "Doctor Jean" will remain with Evariste Poitevin and Odette Comandon as one of the principal names associated with Saintonge culture.

Jean died on 17 February 1932 in Rouffiac, Charente-Maritime.

== List of works ==
La Mérine à Nastasie
Le crassou
Rouffiat! ... Ine minute d'arrêt! ... Buffez!
Le Piantit de Cadet
Bitounîa boet dau champagne!
Batégail dejhun cheû Richardâ
In voeyage malhureux
Toque et Canul
Le judgement du Bac de Chauveau
