= Van Geen =

Van Geen is a surname. Notable people with the surname include:

- Alexander van Geen (1903–1942), Dutch modern pentathlete
- John van Geen (1929–2000), Dutch researcher

== See also ==
- Geen
- Van Veen
