= Saintongeais dialect =

Oïl dialect of historical Saintonge, Aunis, and Angoumois

Saintongeais
- séntunjhaes
- Native to: France
- Region: Charente, Charente-Maritime, Gironde
- Language family: Indo-European: Italic; Latino-Faliscan; Latinic; Romance; Italo-Western; Western; Gallo-Iberian; Gallo-Romance; Gallo-Rhaetian?; Arpitan–Oïl; Oïl; Poitevin–Saintongeais; Saintongeais

Language codes
- ISO 639-3: –
- Glottolog: sant1407
- Linguistic area of Saintongeais the Charentes and the Northern part of Gironde

Saintongeais (French pronunciation: [sɛ̃tɔ̃ʒɛ]; endonym: séntunjhaes) is a dialect of Poitevin–Saintongeais spoken halfway down the western coast of France in the former provinces of Saintonge, Aunis and Angoumois, all of which have been incorporated into the current departments of Charente and Charente-Maritime as well as in parts of the neighbouring department of Gironde and a town in Dordogne. Although many of the same words are used in both Charente departments, they differ in what they mean or in how they are pronounced.

Saintongeais, which is a langue d'oïl variety, and Gascon, which is a langue d'oc variety, have significantly influenced the Acadian and Cajun dialects of French spoken in Canada and the United States respectively.

== Geographic distribution ==
Its area covers the entire department of Charente-Maritime (except the very north), the west and centre of the department of Charente, and the northern part of the department of Gironde with its Pays Gabaye and its enclaves around Saintonge, Monségur. Today, Saintongeais is no longer widely spoken except in the countryside. It is still used in television shows, magazines and radio programs. Some words from Saintongeais are still used in the region. Words like since (floorcloth) are so widespread that they are considered by some to be French.

The Limousin dialect of Occitan used to be spoken in this area and left a substrate on Saintongeais.

== Cultural distribution ==
Along with French, Saintongeais is used in the magazine Xaintonge, which is published twice a year. The great promoters of spoken Charentais at the beginning of the twentieth century were "le Barde Saintongeais" Goulebenéze, succeeded by Odette Comandon, author of comedy and folk tales, patois actress and storyteller. Athanase Jean, a country doctor, also wrote several plays in the dialect and helped promote the Saintonge culture.
