= Geen =

Geen is a surname. Notable people with the surname include:

- Benjamin Geen (born 1980), English nurse
- Billy Geen (1891–1915), Welsh rugby union player

== See also ==
- Van Geen
- Green (surname)
- Jean (surname)
