= Jeans (disambiguation) =

Jeans are denim trousers.

Jeans may also refer to:

== Astronomy ==
- Jeans (lunar crater)
- Jeans (Martian crater)
- 2763 Jeans, an asteroid

== Media and entertainment ==
- Jeans (band), a popular Mexican girl group
- Jeans (film), a 1998 Indian Tamil film by S. Shankar starring Prashanth and Aishwarya Rai
  - Jeans (soundtrack), the soundtrack from the film
- "The Jeans", an episode of the American television show The Middle

== People ==
- Jeans (surname)
- Jeans Coops, Belgian bobsledder and 1939 two-man world champion

== See also ==
- Blue Jeans (disambiguation)
- Jean (disambiguation)
