= Valjean (disambiguation) =

Valjean (1934 – 2003) was an American pianist

Valjean or Val Jean may also refer to:

== Les Misérables ==
- Jean Valjean, the protagonist of Victor Hugo's 1862 novel Les Misérables
- Jean Val Jean, a 1935 English-language retelling of the 1862 novel by Solomon Cleaver

== People ==
- Valjean Dickinson (1929 – 1990), American politician
- Valjean McCarty Hessing (1934 – 2006), Choctaw painter
- Jean Val Jean (actor) (born 1980), French pornographic actor
- Iain Valjean Jensen (born 1988), Australian sailor
- Philip "Moon Valjean" Sneed, a member of the band Greek Fire
- Ion Al. Vasilescu-Valjean, a figure in the Romanian National Agrarian Party

== Places ==
- Valjean, Saskatchewan, an unincorporated community in Canada
- Valjean Hills, a mountain range in California
- Valjean Valley, a valley in California bounded on the west by Silurian Valley

== Other uses ==
- 24601 Valjean, a minor planet
- Val Jean, the Maquis starship featured in Star Trek: Voyager's pilot episode "Caretaker"
- Fantine Valjean, a fictional character in the television series IGPX

== See also ==
- Jean (disambiguation)
