= Jeane =

Jeane may refer to:

- "Jeane" (song), by the English band The Smiths
- Jeane Dixon (1904–1997), American astrologer and psychic
- Jeane Freeman (1953–2026), Scottish National Party politician and businesswoman
- Jeane Gardiner (died 1651), alleged British witch
- Jeane Daniel Gunder (1888–1948), American entomologist
- Jeane Kirkpatrick (1926–2006), American diplomat
- Jeane, a character from the video game series Suikoden
- Jeane, a character from the video game No More Heroes

== See also ==
- Jeanne (disambiguation)
