= Montluçon =

Montluçon Montleçon (Occitan)
- Subprefecture and commune
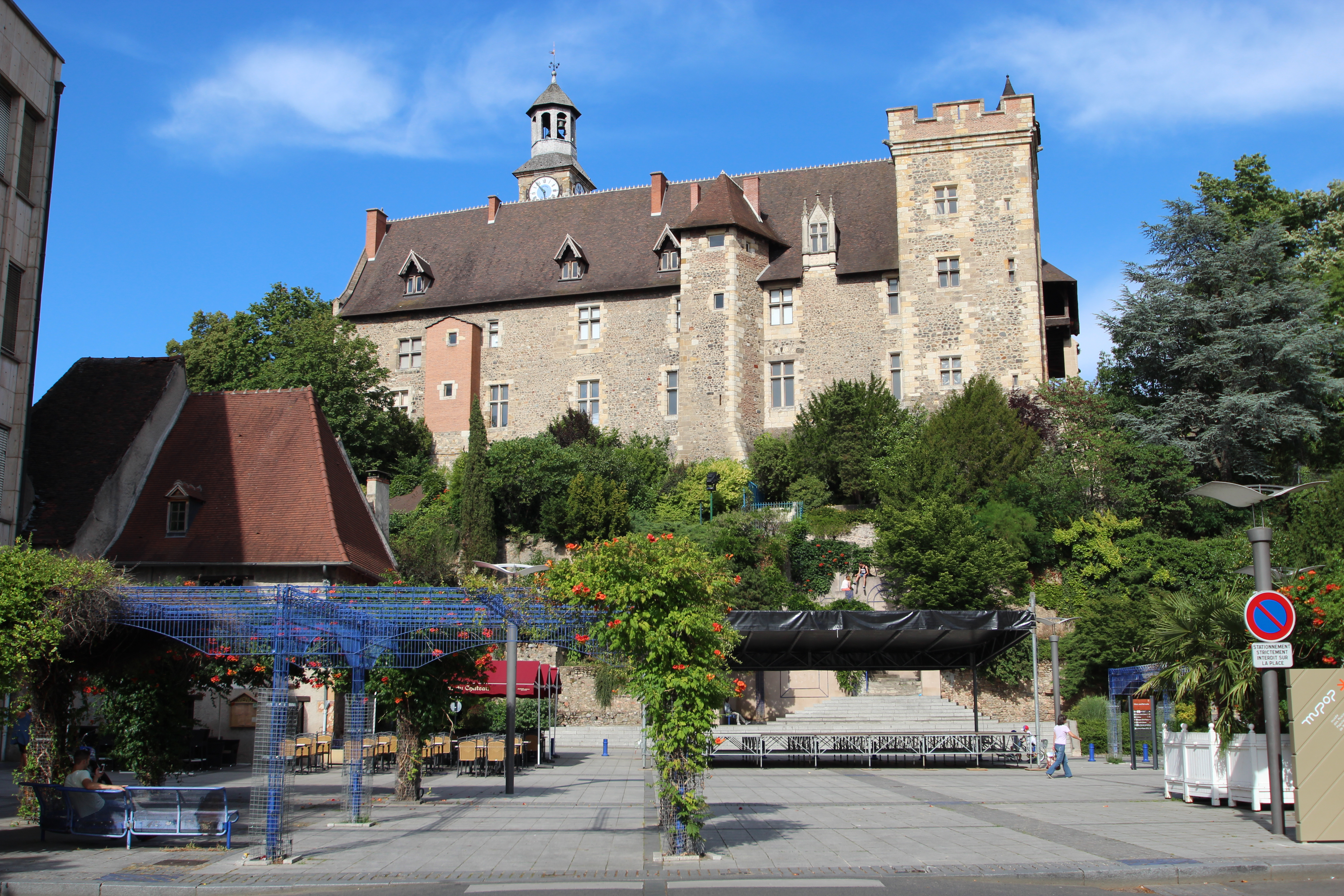
- The Château of the Dukes of Bourbon in Montluçon

- Flag Coat of arms
- Location of Montluçon
- Location within France Location within Auvergne-Rhône-Alpes
- Coordinates: 46°20′27″N 2°36′12″E
- Country: France
- Region: Auvergne-Rhône-Alpes
- Department: Allier
- Arrondissement: Montluçon
- Canton: Montluçon-1, 2, 3 and 4
- Intercommunality: CA Montluçon Communauté

Government
  - Mayor (2026–32): Philippe Perche
- Area^{1}: 20.67 km^{2} (7.98 sq mi)
- Elevation: 207 m (679 ft)
- Highest elevation: 364 m (1,194 ft)
- Lowest elevation: 194 m (636 ft)
- Population (2023): 33,147
  - Density: 1,604/km^{2} (4,153/sq mi)
- Time zone: UTC+01:00 (CET)
  - Summer (DST): UTC+02:00 (CEST)
- INSEE/Postal code: 03185 /03100
- ^{1} French Land Register data, which excludes lakes, ponds, glaciers > 1 km^{2} (0.386 sq mi or 247 acres) and river estuaries.

Montluçon (French: [mɔ̃lysɔ̃]; Occitan: Montleçon [munləˈsu]) is a commune in central France on the river Cher. It is the largest commune in the Allier department, although the department's prefecture is located in the smaller town of Moulins. Its inhabitants are known as Montluçonnais. The town is in the traditional province of Bourbonnais and was part of the mediaeval duchy of Bourbon.

== Geography ==
Montluçon is located in the northwest of the Allier department near the frontier of the Centre-Val de Loire and Nouvelle-Aquitaine regions.

Montluçon is linked with surrounding regions and towns via four main road axes, plus the highway A71 from Orléans to Clermont-Ferrand; through a railway linking in the North Vierzon then Paris (3-5h). Formerly the canal de Berry linked Montluçon towards the north.

Montluçon is 106 kilometres (66 miles) south of Bourges, 340 km (211 miles) from Paris, 95 km (59 mi) from Clermont-Ferrand, 280 km (174 mi) (3h) from Lyon, 150 km (93 mi) (2h) from Limoges and 400 km (249 mi) from the Atlantic coast.

Montluçon is close to the Méridienne verte (an architectural project marking the Paris meridian) and to the Greenwich meridian.

Montluçon is also close to the geographic centre of Metropolitan France.

== History ==
=== Early history ===
Montluçon was built in the Middle Ages. The first mention of a place called Monte Lucii (Mont de Lucius) dates from the eleventh century. Guillaume, son of Archambaud IV of Bourbon, built the castle in a defensible position on a small rocky hill on a bend in the river Cher.

The town, which formed part of the duchy of Bourbon, was taken by Henry II in 1171, and by Philip Augustus in 1181; the English were finally driven out in the 14th century.

In the 14th century, Louis II, Duke of Bourbon re-built the castle and walls. Montluçon and other Bourbon lands reverted to the French crown in 1529, and Henry IV further improved the defenses.

Montluçon became the administrative seat of the area in 1791, then entered the industrial era thanks to the presence of coalpits 12 km (7 mi) distant in Commentry, the Canal de Berry in 1830 and the railway in 1864. These transport links allowed the import of ore and export of coal, wood and manufactured goods. The population grew from 5000 inhabitants in 1830 to 50 000 in 1950.

During the repression of January and February 1894, the police conducted raids targeting the anarchists living there, without much success.

=== World War II ===
During the Second World War, the Germans occupied the Dunlop tyre plant (even though Montluçon was in the free zone) to exploit the research laboratory to synthesize rubber, since natural rubber could not be imported by Germany. The manufacturing of tyres for Luftwaffe aircraft was also of interest for the Germans.

For this reason, the Allies bombed the site on 12–16 September 1943, as well as part of the nearby town Saint-Victor, causing 36 deaths and injuring more than 250 civilians.

A notable act of resistance occurred in the city on 6 January 1943 when a mob of citizens overran guards supervising a massive deportation of men to Germany in accordance with the Service de Travail Obligatoire (Obligatory Work Service) plan that sent able Frenchmen to fill vacancies in German factories during the war. All the men who were to be deported managed to escape into the countryside, evading the forced industrial service awaiting them in the Reich.

=== Post-World War II ===
Since 1945, traditional industry (blast furnaces and glassware) has declined. Today Montluçon has chemical industries, tyre manufacture (Dunlop), and electronics (mainly Sagem, now Safran Electronics & Defense), and more recently a technopole at La Loue was established for high-tech companies.

New Zealand-born SOE agent Nancy Wake, the most decorated woman of World War II, led her small army of resistance fighters in the countryside around Montluçon. Wake died on 7 August 2011 aged 98, and on 11 March 2013, her ashes were scattered in a small wood outside Montluçon. The ceremony was followed by a civic reception in the town.

== Population ==
Historical population

Year	Pop.	±% p.a.
1793	5,521	—
1800	5,684	+0.42%
1806	5,212	−1.43%
1821	4,716	−0.66%
1831	4,991	+0.57%
1836	5,034	+0.17%
1841	5,740	+2.66%
1846	7,331	+5.01%
1851	8,922	+4.01%
1856	15,289	+11.37%
1861	16,212	+1.18%
1866	18,675	+2.87%
1872	21,247	+2.17%
1876	23,416	+2.46%
1881	26,079	+2.18%
1886	27,818	+1.30%
1891	27,878	+0.04%
1896	31,595	+2.53%
1901	35,062	+2.10%

Year	Pop.	±% p.a.
1906	34,251	−0.47%
1911	33,799	−0.27%
1921	36,114	+0.66%
1926	37,504	+0.76%
1931	41,052	+1.82%
1936	42,515	+0.70%
1946	46,826	+0.97%
1954	48,743	+0.50%
1962	55,184	+1.56%
1968	57,871	+0.80%
1975	56,468	−0.35%
1982	49,912	−1.75%
1990	44,248	−1.49%
1999	41,362	−0.75%
2007	39,761	−0.49%
2012	38,072	−0.86%
2017	35,653	−1.30%
2023	33,147	−1.21%

Source: EHESS and INSEE (1968-2023)

== Transportation ==
=== Air ===
There is a small airport 30 km (19 mi) from Montluçon (Montluçon - Guéret Airport) with flights mainly for Paris, and a smaller aerodrome in Montluçon itself (Montluçon - Domérat Aerodrome). The nearest international airports are Clermont-Ferrand Airport and Limoges Airport.

=== Road ===
Montluçon is linked to French and European road networks, by three major routes:

- the highway A71 from Orléans to Clermont-Ferrand.
- the national route to Clermont-Ferrand (E11) and to Bourges/Vierzon
- the E62/RN145 joining Limoges to Moulins

=== Rail ===
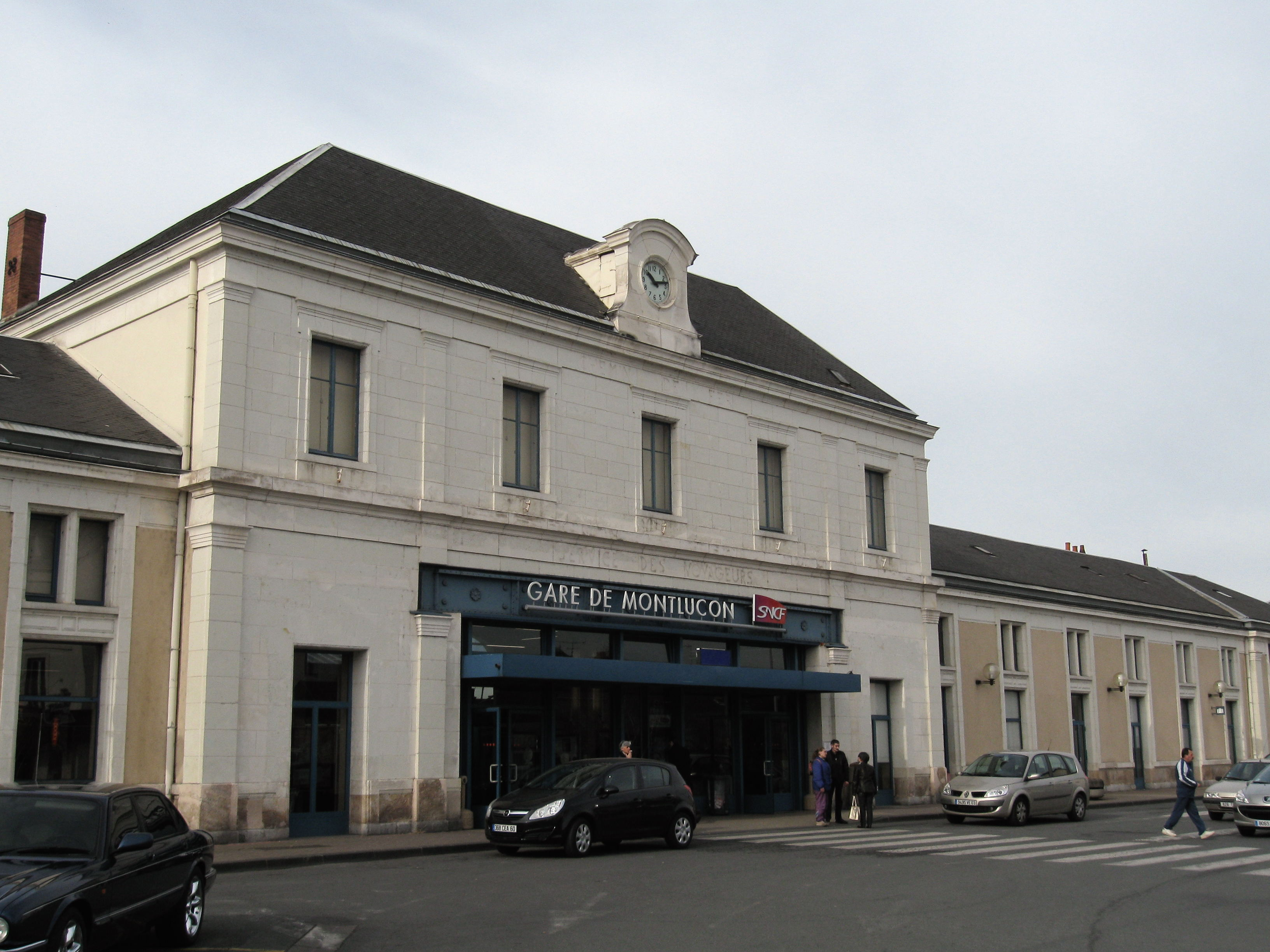
Montluçon-Ville railway station

The Gare de Montluçon-Ville railway station is served by three main passenger rail lines.

- 'Montluçon - Bourges - Vierzon - Paris' (fastest travel time to Paris: 3h08)
- 'Montluçon - Gannat - Clermont-Ferrand'
- 'Montluçon - Guéret - Saint-Sulpice-Laurière - Limoges' (on the Lyon-Bordeaux line)

=== City buses ===
Montluçon's local buses are run by Maelis.

== Sights ==
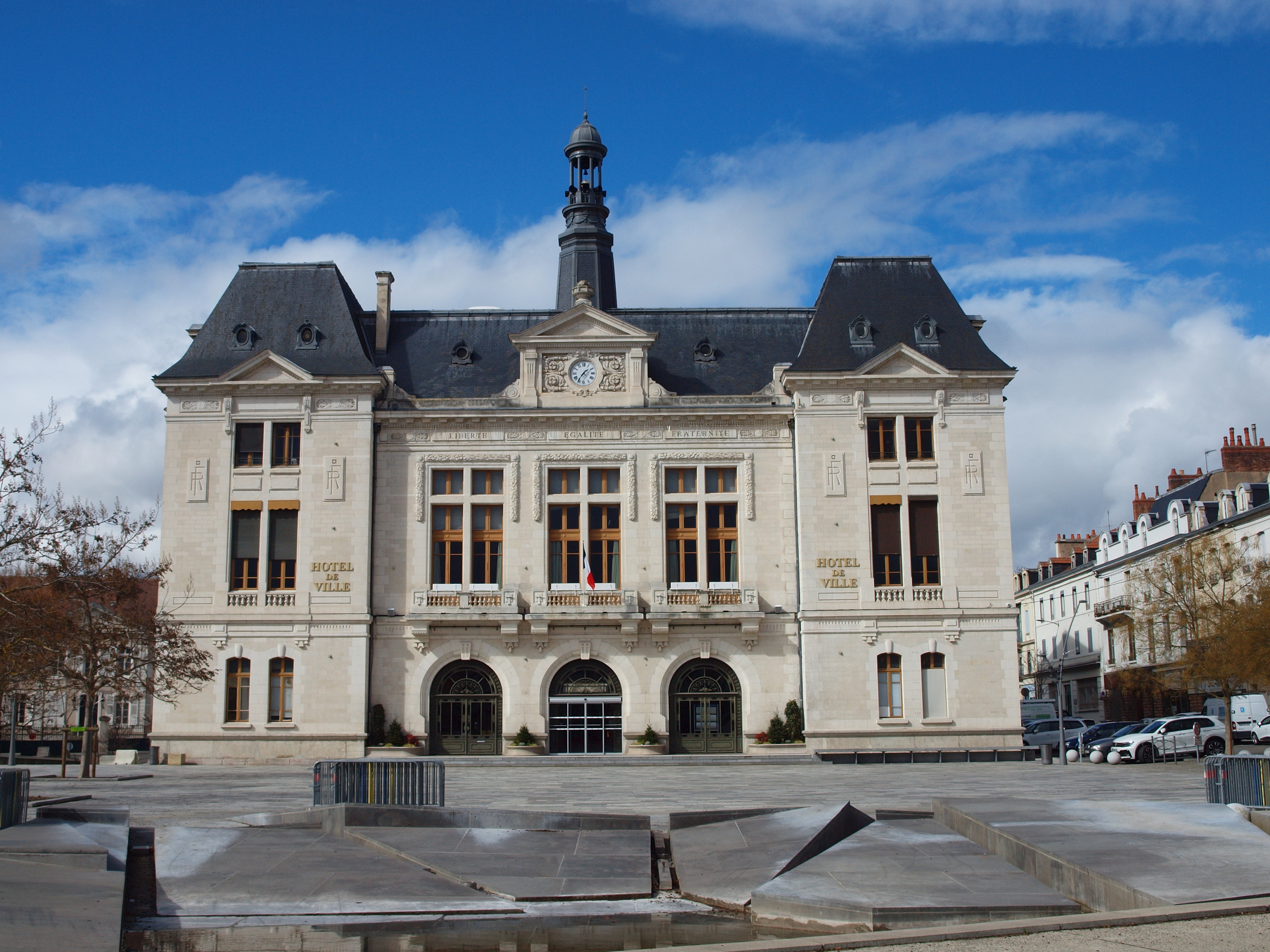
The Hôtel de Ville

The upper town, on the right bank of the Cher, consists of steep, narrow, winding streets, and preserves several buildings of the 15th and 16th centuries. The lower town, traversed by the Cher, is the industrial zone.

The church of Notre-Dame dates from the fourteenth century, the church of St Pierre partly from the 12th. The Hôtel de Ville (town hall) occupies the site of an old Ursuline convent, and was completed in 1912.

Two other convents are used as a college and hospital. Overlooking the town is the castle rebuilt by Louis II, Duke of Bourbon, and taken by Henry IV during the French Wars of Religion; it serves as a barracks.

=== Monuments ===
- The Dukes of the Bourbon castle in Montluçon, dating from the 13th and 14th centuries
- Church of Notre-Dame, XVe
- Church of Saint-Pierre, XIIe
- Church of Saint-Paul, XIXe
- Church of Sainte-Thérèse, XXe
- Church of Saint-Martin, XXe
- Church of Sainte-Jeanne d'Arc, built in 1966
- Temple de l'Église Réformée de France, (1888)
- Tour des forges (or 'tour fondue'), XIIe siècle
- Crown, XIIe
- Maison des Douze apôtres du XIIe
- Museum of popular musiques
- Town Hall, XIXe
- Ancienne chapelle Saint-Louis
- Passage du doyenné
- Castle la Louvière
- Castle de Bien-Assis
- Canal de Berry: locks, canal bridge

=== Culture ===
- Musée des Musiques Populaires
- Théâtre Municipal Gabrielle Robinne

== International relations ==
Montluçon is twinned with:

- Antsirabe, Madagascar
- Guimarães, Portugal
- Hagen, Germany
- Igualada, Spain
- Leszno, Poland

== Miscellaneous ==
Administration: Montluçon is a sub-prefecture and has courts, a board of trade arbitration, a chamber of commerce and several schools (general public, private, commercial).

Sport:

- ÉDS Montluçon

== Personalities ==
Montluçon was the birthplace of:

- Achille Allier (1807-1836), archaeologist and writer
- Françoise Bonnet (born 1957), a long-distance runner and Olympic athlete
- Guy Chauvet (1933–2007), a tenor
- Jules Cluzel (born 1988), a motorcycle Grand Prix road racer
- Suzanne Débarbat (1928–2024), an astronomer and historian
- Marx Dormoy (1888–1941), a politician
- Michael Fitzpatrick (born 1970), American musician, lead singer of Fitz and the Tantrums
- Jehan (born 1957), a songwriter
- Jean-Daniel Lafond, spouse of former Governor General of Canada, Michaelle Jean.
- Louis Alexis Étienne Bonvin (1886-1946) Governor General of French India between 1938 and 1946
- André Messager (1853–1929), a composer
- Raoul Minot (1893–1945), WWI veteran, department store vendor, and clandestine amateur photographer in Nazi-occupied Paris; honored during WWI Croix de guerre with bronze medal, and after WWII as Mort pour la France
- Moïse Rimbon (born 1977), a mixed martial arts fighter
- Gabrielle Robinne (1886-1980), a stage and film actress
- Florian Vachon (born 1985), a professional road bicycle racer
- Jean Val Jean (born 1980), an adult film actor
- Bernadette Vergnaud (born 1950), a French politician and Member of the European Parliament
- Roger Walkowiak (1927-2017), a cyclist, winner of the 1956 Tour de France
- Fud Leclerc (1924-2010) singer, participant in the Eurovision Song Contest 1956, 1958, 1960 and 1962.

== Climate ==
Climate data for Montluçon (2002–2020 normals, extremes 2002–present)
Month	Jan	Feb	Mar	Apr	May	Jun	Jul	Aug	Sep	Oct	Nov	Dec	Year
Record high °C (°F)	21.8 (71.2)	23.2 (73.8)	25.5 (77.9)	30.0 (86.0)	33.9 (93.0)	40.8 (105.4)	41.1 (106.0)	41.3 (106.3)	36.0 (96.8)	34.6 (94.3)	27.7 (81.9)	20.8 (69.4)	41.3 (106.3)
Mean daily maximum °C (°F)	8.1 (46.6)	9.4 (48.9)	13.6 (56.5)	17.5 (63.5)	20.5 (68.9)	25.2 (77.4)	27.4 (81.3)	27.0 (80.6)	23.3 (73.9)	18.4 (65.1)	12.9 (55.2)	9.1 (48.4)	17.7 (63.9)
Daily mean °C (°F)	4.4 (39.9)	4.7 (40.5)	7.8 (46.0)	11.1 (52.0)	14.3 (57.7)	18.7 (65.7)	20.6 (69.1)	20.2 (68.4)	16.4 (61.5)	12.8 (55.0)	8.2 (46.8)	5.2 (41.4)	12.0 (53.6)
Mean daily minimum °C (°F)	0.6 (33.1)	0.1 (32.2)	2.0 (35.6)	4.7 (40.5)	8.1 (46.6)	12.3 (54.1)	13.8 (56.8)	13.3 (55.9)	9.5 (49.1)	7.2 (45.0)	3.6 (38.5)	1.3 (34.3)	6.4 (43.5)
Record low °C (°F)	−13.9 (7.0)	−15.6 (3.9)	−12.9 (8.8)	−7.5 (18.5)	3.3 (37.9)	2.1 (35.8)	4.7 (40.5)	4.1 (39.4)	−0.8 (30.6)	−6.1 (21.0)	−9.6 (14.7)	−13.6 (7.5)	−15.6 (3.9)
Average precipitation mm (inches)	46.4 (1.83)	34.1 (1.34)	44.5 (1.75)	60.5 (2.38)	73.2 (2.88)	57.8 (2.28)	54.6 (2.15)	59.0 (2.32)	50.4 (1.98)	58.7 (2.31)	52.2 (2.06)	45.7 (1.80)	637.1 (25.08)
Average precipitation days (≥ 1.0 mm)	9.5	8.0	9.2	9.3	10.2	7.9	7.0	7.1	6.5	9.3	10.0	9.7	103.7
Source: Meteociel

== See also ==
- Communes of the Allier department
