= Genn =

Genn is a surname. Notable people with the surname include:

- Antony Genn (born 1971), musician
- Dave Genn (born 1969), musician
- Felix Genn (born 1950), German Roman Catholic bishop
- Hazel Genn (born 1949), lawyer
- James Genn (born 1972), filmmaker
- Leo Genn (1905–1978), actor
- Robert Genn (1936–2014), artist
- Scott Genn (born 1972), actor, musician
