= Jahanara Rob =

Bangladeshi politician

Member of the Bangladesh Parliament for Reserved Women's Seat-3
- In office 7 April 1973 – 6 November 1975
- Preceded by: Position created

Personal details
- Born: 1928/1929
- Died: 1 October 2014 (aged 85) Dhaka, Bangladesh
- Party: Awami League

Jahanara Rob (1928/1929 – 1 October 2014) was an Awami League politician and a member of parliament in a reserved seat.

== Career ==
Rob was elected to parliament from a reserved seat as an Awami League candidate in 1973.

== Personal life ==
Rob was married to Abdur Rob Boga Mia, a former president of the Pabna District unit of the Awami League and member of the Constituent Assembly of Bangladesh. He died in a road crash in 1973 while campaigning for the election.

== Death ==
Rob died on 1 October 2014 in Square Hospital, Dhaka, Bangladesh.
