= Eugène Jean =

Haitian painter

Eugène Jean (French pronunciation: [øʒɛn ʒɑ̃]; born 1950) is a Haitian painter. Born in Trou du Nord, Jean typically paints humorous scenes of common people. He has been a member of the Centre d'Art since 1971 and has had several exhibitions in the United States. He first worked with fellow Haitian painter Philomé Obin.
