= Jeanie Johnson =

Jeanie Johnston (born Carrickfergus) is a former Northern Irish television presenter and journalist.

== Career ==
Johnston joined UTV in 1978, reporting for news programmes Good Evening Ulster, Six Tonight and UTV Live. She later became UTV's Health and Education Correspondent.

In 2000, Johnston was appointed Features Editor at the station, responsible for the content on UTV Life. She took voluntary redundancy from UTV in January 2009.

== Personal life ==
In an interview discussing her departure from UTV, Johnston stated a desire to work in health consultancy with her friend and former UTV colleague Kate Smith.

Johnston is a patron of the charity Heartbeat. She has two children.
