= Ignatius Jean =

Saint Lucian politician

Ignatius Jean is a Saint Lucian politician who represented the Castries North constituency for the Saint Lucia Labour Party until he was defeated in the general election of 11 December 2006. Ignatius Jean is the Country Representative of the Inter-American Institute for Cooperation on Agriculture (IICA) in Guyana since June, 2007.

He was elected as the Representative of the Castries North Constituency in the St. Lucia House of Assembly in December, 2001. He served in the Cabinet of Prime Minister Dr. Kenny D. Anthony as Minister of Agriculture, Forestry and Fisheries (MAFF) in the Government of Saint Lucia (2004–2006), Minister of Physical Planning, Environment and Housing (2002–2003); Parliamentary Secretary MAFF (2001–2002).

He holds an M.Sc. in Agricultural Management (1995) and Post Graduate Diploma in Agricultural Economics from the University of Reading, UK (1994); Certificate in Risk Management, Insurance Institute of America (1998); Diploma in Agriculture from the Guyana School of Agriculture (1981–1983), Certificate in Business Administration UWI (1992).

He worked as an agronomist in the Banana Industry of Saint Lucia 1980 -1987 and later as the Chief Loss Adjuster of the Windward Islands’ Crop Insurance Limited (WINCROP) 1988 - 2001.
