= Pokhara Theatre =

Community-based theatre organization founded in Nepal

- Type: Professional
- Industry: Theatre / Performing Arts
- Founded: 2016
- Headquarters: Pokhara, Nepal
- Key people: Pariwartan (Founder/CEO)
- Website: www.pokharatheatre.com.np

Pokhara Theatre is a community-based theatre organization founded in 2016 in Pokhara, Nepal. It is known for producing original plays, adaptations of classical works, and organizing theatre festivals.

== History ==
Theatre activities began in 2016 when a group of local artists came together. The regular staging of play began here in 2018. Over the years, the group became recognized as a leading cultural institution in the region having the only modern black box theatre called Gandharba Theatre in the town.

== Productions ==
The group has staged a variety of productions, ranging from modern dramas to classical adaptations. Some Notable works include

- Siruma Rani (2017) – Playwright Sarubhakta
- Atal Bahadur Ko Atanka (2018) – Playwright Khagendra Lamichhane
- Nirmaya (2019) – Playwright Sarubhakta
- Yo Kasto Mahabharat (2019) – Playwright Deepak Parajuli
- Ek Chihan (2019) – Playwright Hriday Chandra Singh Pradhan
- Urvashi Sukta (2023) – Playwright Shiva Sankalpa

== Activities ==
Beyond staging plays, the group actively fosters performing arts through workshops, acting classes, and theatre festivals, with a particular emphasis on school-level drama. By organizing inter-school theatre competitions and youth drama festivals, they provide young performers with platforms to explore creativity, develop stage skills, and engage with storytelling traditions.

== Notable Members ==
- Pariwartan – Founder and CEO
- Dil Prasad Gurung – Founder
- Shankar Nath Koirala – Founder
- Sarubhakta – Playwright of Sirumarani, Nirmaya, Bakas
- Shiva Sankalpa – Playwright/Director of Urvashi Sukta.
