= Château of the Dukes of Bourbon =

Castle in Auvergne-Rhône-Alpes, France

Coordinates: 46.3401°N 2.6035°E

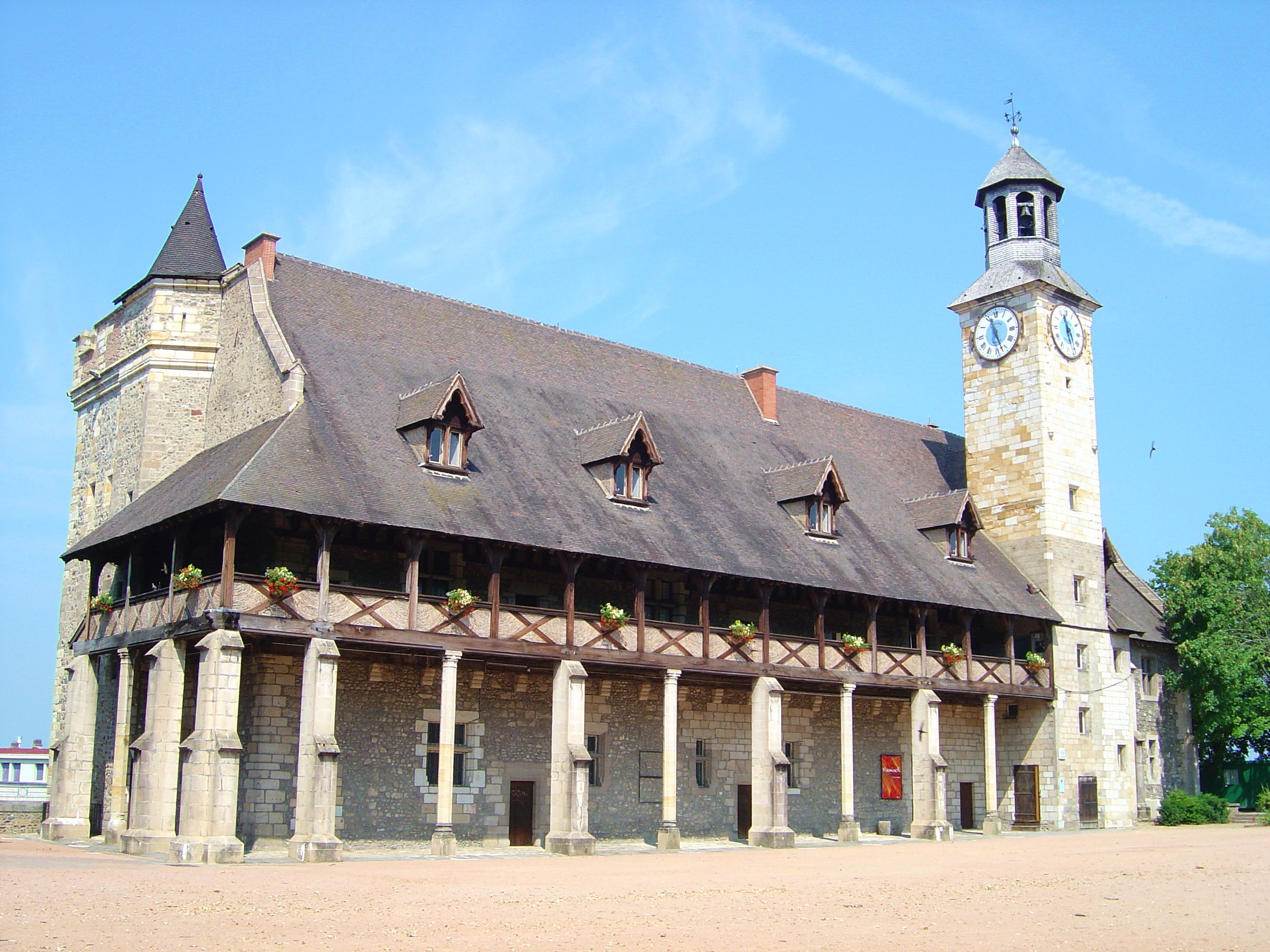
Montluçon castle

The Château of the Dukes of Bourbon is a castle in Montluçon, France, largely built by the Dukes of Bourbon.

In 1070, Guillaume, son of Archambaud IV of Bourbon (died 1095) became Seigneur of Montluçon and built a fortress on a castrum.

The English occupied the Castle of Montluçon from 1171 to 1188. After that invasion, Philip Augustus handed it over to the Bourbon family. The latter transformed it into a stronghold.

The remainder of the castle was built starting from 1370, at the heart of the Hundred Years' War, by Louis II, Duke of Bourbon.

The edifice was surrounded by a double row of ramparts, was drilled by four doors and counted forty-one watchtowers. During the unification of the Bourbonnais to the crown of France, during the reign of Francis I, the castle was abandoned. Louis II Duke of Bourbon, was the main contributor to the construction of the castle. It was started during the Hundred Years' War, but people still worked on it on the eve of the Renaissance. In the first half of the 14th century, Louis II, Duke of Bourbon and his successors raised the big abode, more or less such as it is today. The square tower, the opening of the East facade, the North wing and the Clock Tower are dated from the middle of the 15th century and belong to three construction campaigns, the two first ones being very close to each other. Finally, during the last half of the 15th century, the gallery was raised on the court, and the North inside was embellished.

These varied constructions, even though quite modern, enable us to follow the well-known evolution that was produced in the French military architecture during the 15th century. Louis II came up with the idea of a real fortified castle that he couldn’t achieve, and which was embellished by his successors, with a gallery, an elegant turret and wide openings, became a place of pleasure for the last Dukes of Bourbon.

It has been abandoned since 1527.

After 1662, the princes of Condé, became lords tenants of crown lands of the Bourbonnais, conceded the castle to a farmer and they became totally disinterested by it. This one is in a very poor shape according to Nicolas de Nicolay who observed that "without really taking care of the roof the castle fell in ruins", which was a "big shame".

Coat of arms of Montluçon

During the Revolution, only the coats of arms of the Dukes of Bourbon were destroyed from the Clock Tower. Then the police court, took its place in one of the rooms of the castle which, because of its size, served also as a place of meeting for the General Assembly of the inhabitants.

The city of Montluçon bought the castle from Louis Joseph (the Prince of Condé at the time) on 8 April 1816 in order to do an infantry barracks. From that moment, the most deplorable demolitions happened.

== Architecture ==
The castle got rid of its wood gallery to make room to concrete constructions. The inside was reworked many times for the installation of a court, an auditorium and offices for the city hall of Montluçon. To sum up, the castle of Montluçon, rebuilt during the very end of the 14th century had to suffer, after having known a moment of splendor, a three centuries period where nobody lived there. During the whole 19th century followed a period of demolitions still more disastrous.

In 1935, the city of Montluçon restored the castle. From that restoration, only the wood gallery was carried out. Indeed, the gothic style skylight has been poorly restored and recovered by cement, as well as the room from the second floor of the donjon. A room that seemed to be the former bedroom of the Good Duke, Louis II of Bourbon, and in which he died in August 1410.

In that room, there is a barrel vault in semicircle, raised, lowered on two arches. That vault is curious, because it is a rib vault with two additional branches, which go from each angle from the wall face, in order to end in the main keystone. This layout is caused by the fact that there is a hearth with cut section, the keystone which complete the whole of that room is composed of four fleurons shining all around a coat of arms and reunited by small arches in trefoil.

The walls from that room are also covered by cement. The rock’s jointures of the castle of Montluçon are all renovated with cement as well, which cannot be considered as authentic.

The ceilings from the main rooms of the castle were renovated with panelings, which were recovered, for some of them, by metal frames installed during the restoration of the 1930s.

The castle was registered as one of the historical monuments 15 May 1926.
