= Rouffiac, Charente-Maritime =

Rouffiac
- Commune
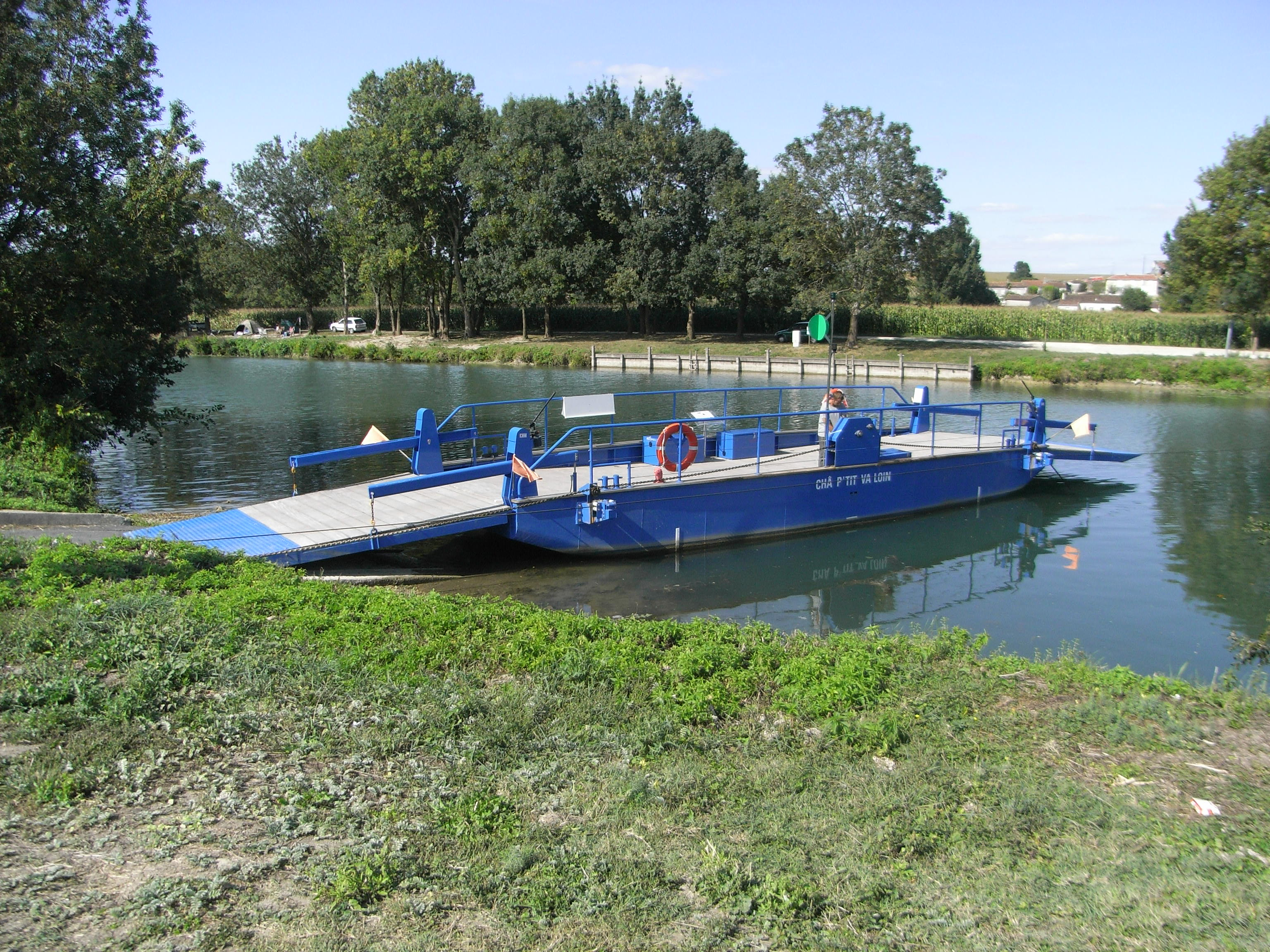
- Ferry on the Charente

- Coat of arms
- Location of Rouffiac
- Location within France Location within Nouvelle-Aquitaine
- Coordinates: 45°41′12″N 0°29′21″W
- Country: France
- Region: Nouvelle-Aquitaine
- Department: Charente-Maritime
- Arrondissement: Saintes
- Canton: Thénac
- Intercommunality: CA Saintes

Government
  - Mayor (2020–2026): David Musseau
- Area^{1}: 5.85 km^{2} (2.26 sq mi)
- Highest elevation: 27 m (89 ft)
- Lowest elevation: 2 m (6.6 ft)
- Population (2023): 519
  - Density: 88.7/km^{2} (230/sq mi)
- Time zone: UTC+01:00 (CET)
  - Summer (DST): UTC+02:00 (CEST)
- INSEE/Postal code: 17304 /17800
- ^{1} French Land Register data, which excludes lakes, ponds, glaciers > 1 km^{2} (0.386 sq mi or 247 acres) and river estuaries.

Rouffiac (French pronunciation: [ʁufjak]) is a commune in the Charente-Maritime department in southwestern France.

== Population ==
Historical population
Year	Pop.	±% p.a.
1968	364	—
1975	396	+1.21%
1982	359	−1.39%
1990	352	−0.25%
1999	327	−0.82%
2007	415	+3.02%
2012	483	+3.08%
2017	459	−1.01%
2023	519	+2.07%
Source: INSEE

== See also ==
- Communes of the Charente-Maritime department

== Information ==
Rouffiac is a commune in France located in Charente-Maritime. This commune is situated next to the river "La Charente". It is a very agricultural commune, most of the plots are for agriculture and are owned by local villagers or farmers. This commune provides many outdoor activities such as the famous "pétanque" competition which is a french sport with metallic balls.
