= Jehanne (disambiguation) =

Jehanne, or Joan of Arc, is a patron saint of France.

Jehanne or variant, may also refer to:

- Jehanne la Pucelle d'Ay de Domremy (1412–1431, Saint Joan of Arc), Patron Saint of France
- Jehanne d'Alcy (1865–1956), French actress
- Jehanne Collard (1950–2021), French lawyer
- Jehanne d'Orliac (1883–1974), French dramatist
- Jehanne Mance (1606–1673), co-founder of Montreal
- Jehanne Rousseau (born 1976), French videogame producer
- Jehanne Wake (born 1966), British biographer
- Édith Jéhanne (1899–1949), French actress
- Jeanne (given name), spelled "Jehanne" in medieval Middle French but "Jeanne" in modern French
- Joan (given name), spelled "Jehanne" in medieval Anglo-Norman but "Joan" in modern English

== See also ==
- Jehan
- Jihan
- Jeanne (disambiguation)
- Jean (disambiguation)
- Joan (disambiguation)
- Joanne (disambiguation)
