= Jahan (name) =

Jahan (Persian: جهان, Urdu: جہاں, Bengali: জাহান) is a word of Persian origin meaning "world" or "universe". It is used as a gender neutral first name or surname in the Middle East, Central and South Asia. The Turkish rendering of the same name is Cihan.

Along with Jehan, it is also a variant and ancient form of French name and surname Jean. The surnames Jahan and Jehan have been most prevalent in northwestern France (e.g. Normandy, Brittany, Touraine).

== See also ==
- Jahan Ara
- Jahan Dotson
- Jahan Salehi
- Jahan Shah
- Jahan Temür
- Khan Jahan Ali
- Nasreen Jahan
- Nur Jahan
- Shah Jahan III
- Shah Jahan
- Jahan (also: John; Horse of Nandor the Relentless)
- Nusrat Jahan Begum
- Nusrat Jahan
- Cihan Aktas
- Cihan Alptekin
