= Sternwheeler Jean =

- JEAN (steamboat)
- U.S. National Register of Historic Places
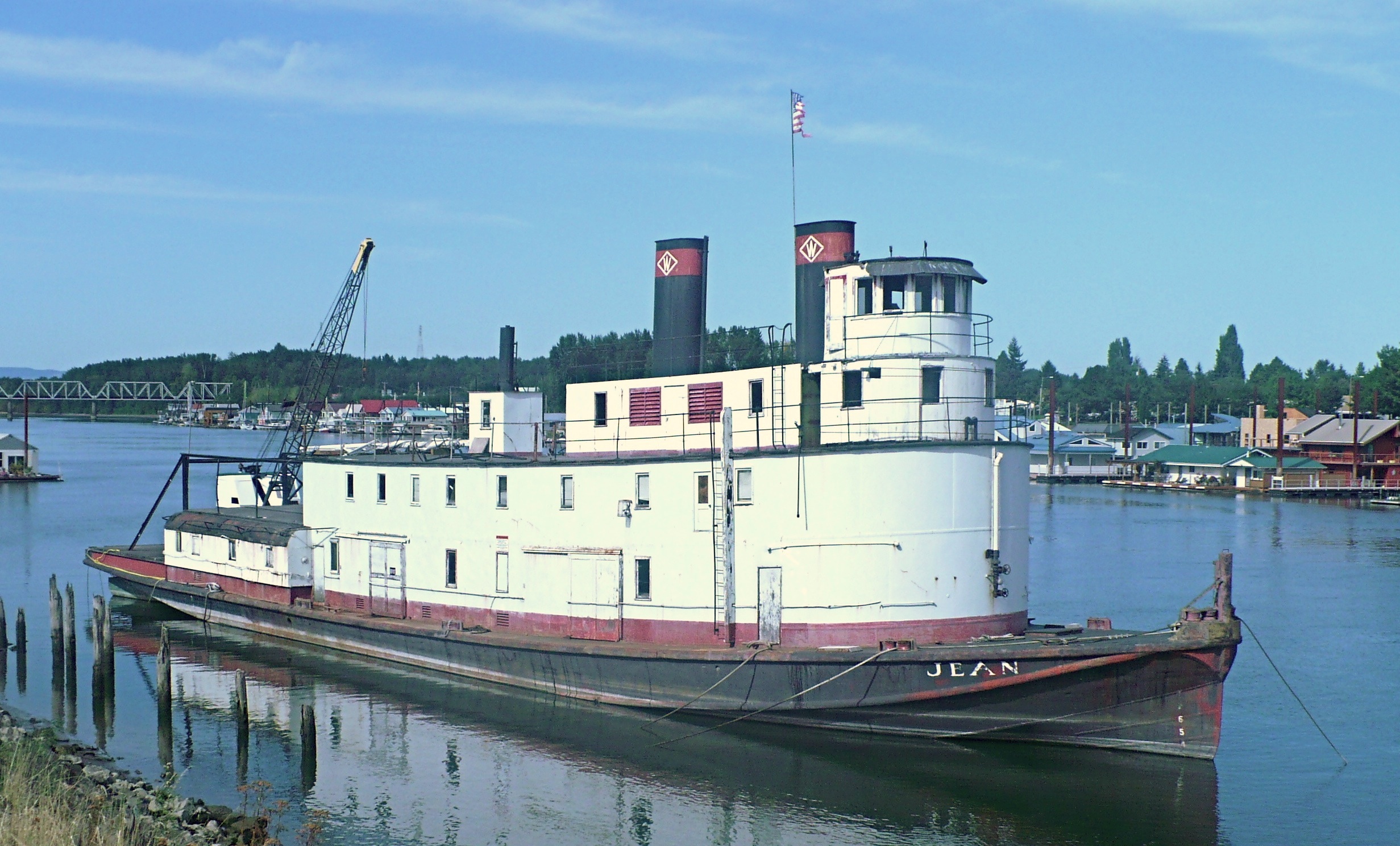
- Jean moored in the North Portland Harbor in 2009
- Location: near Rainier, Oregon
- Area: less than one acre
- Built: 1938
- Architectural style: Steam-powered tugboat, former sternwheeler
- NRHP reference No.: 89001001
- Added to NRHP: August 8, 1989

The Sternwheeler Jean is a historic steamboat that operated on the Willamette River, in the U.S. state of Oregon. It is a 168-foot (51 m)-long tugboat (counting its paddle wheels, now removed), built in 1938 for the Western Transportation Company (a former Crown Zellerbach subsidiary) and in service until 1957. Its steam engines and all other machinery instead the vessel were removed in 1962. In August 1989, it was listed on the U.S. National Register of Historic Places in Nez Perce County, Idaho. At that time, it was located in Lewiston, Idaho, having been there since 1976. In Lewiston, its location changed from time to time, and Hells Gate State Park was among the locations where Jean was moored. As of 1997, it was still in Lewiston, afloat on the Snake River. Its private owner at that time, the James River Corporation, sold the tug in 1998. In July 2004, Jean was moved from Lewiston to Portland, Oregon, and was moored in the North Portland Harbor. Subsequently, by 2009, its twin paddle wheels had been removed. By early 2022, it had been moved to Sauvie Island and was for sale. By fall 2023, it had been moved to near Rainier, Oregon.

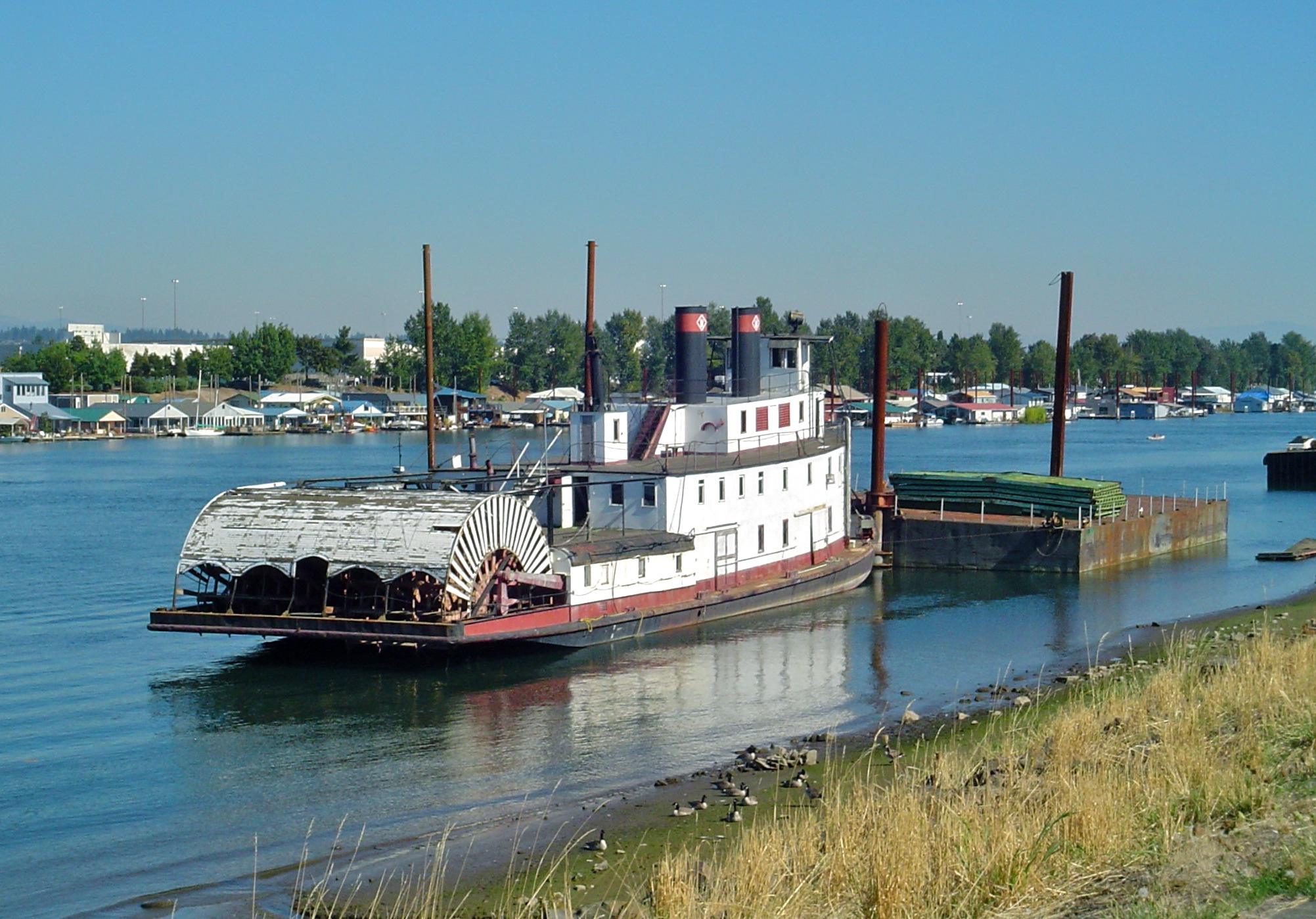
Jean in Portland in 2006, before its paddle wheels were removed
