= Jeanne (crater) =

Crater on Venus

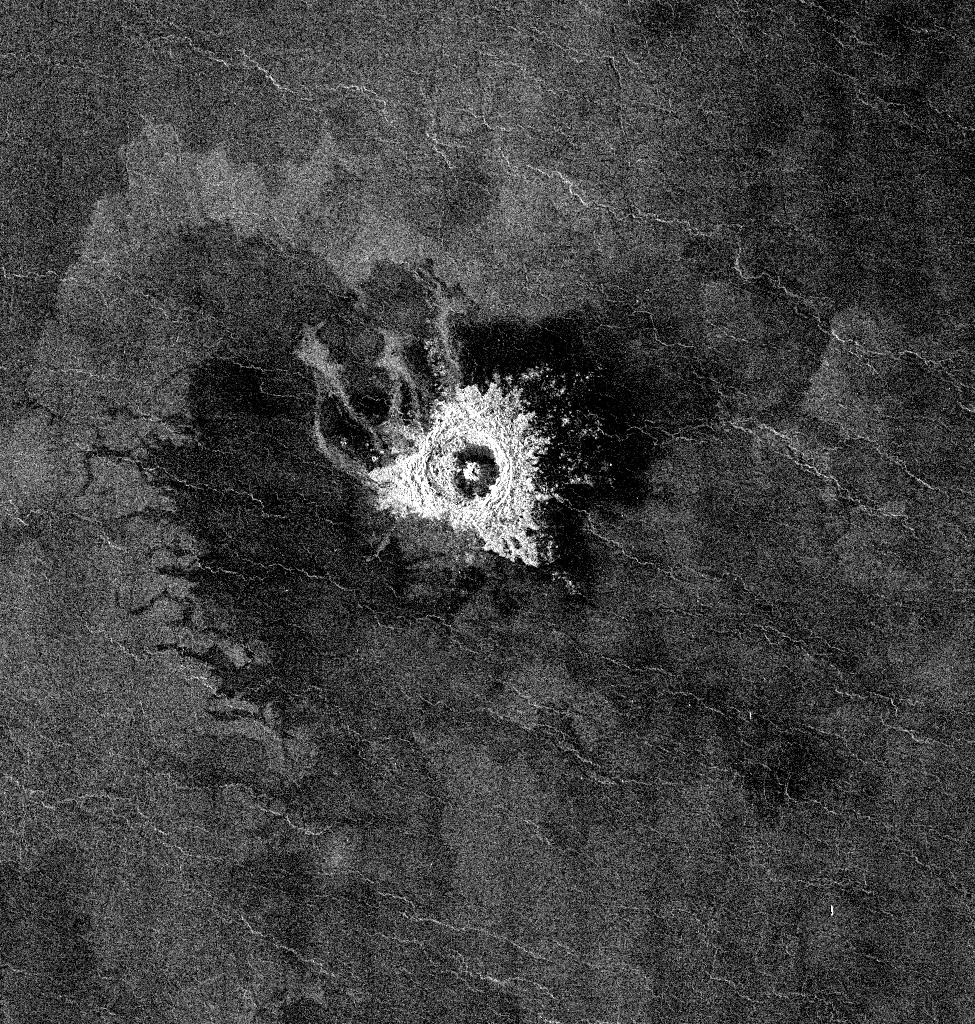
- Location: Venus
- Coordinates: 40.1°N 331.5°E
- Diameter: 19.4 km
- Eponym: French first name

Jeanne is a 19.4 km diameter impact crater on the surface of Venus.

== Geological Description ==
The distinctive triangular shape of the ejecta indicates that the impacting body probably hit obliquely, traveling from southwest to northeast. The crater is surrounded by dark material of two types. The dark area on the southwest side of the crater is covered by smooth (radar-dark) lava flows which have a strongly digitate contact with surrounding brighter flows. The very dark area on the northeast side of the crater is probably covered by smooth material such as fine-grained sediment. This dark halo is asymmetric, mimicking the asymmetric shape of the ejecta blanket. The dark halo may have been caused by an atmospheric shock or pressure wave produced by the incoming body. Jeanne crater also displays several outflow lobes on the northwest side. These flow-like features may have formed by fine-grained ejecta transported by a hot, turbulent flow created by the arrival of the impacting object. Alternatively, they may have formed by flow of impact melt.

== Naming ==
The name derives from the first name of French, Jeanne. It was accepted by the IAU in the year 1985.
