= Jehan (singer) =

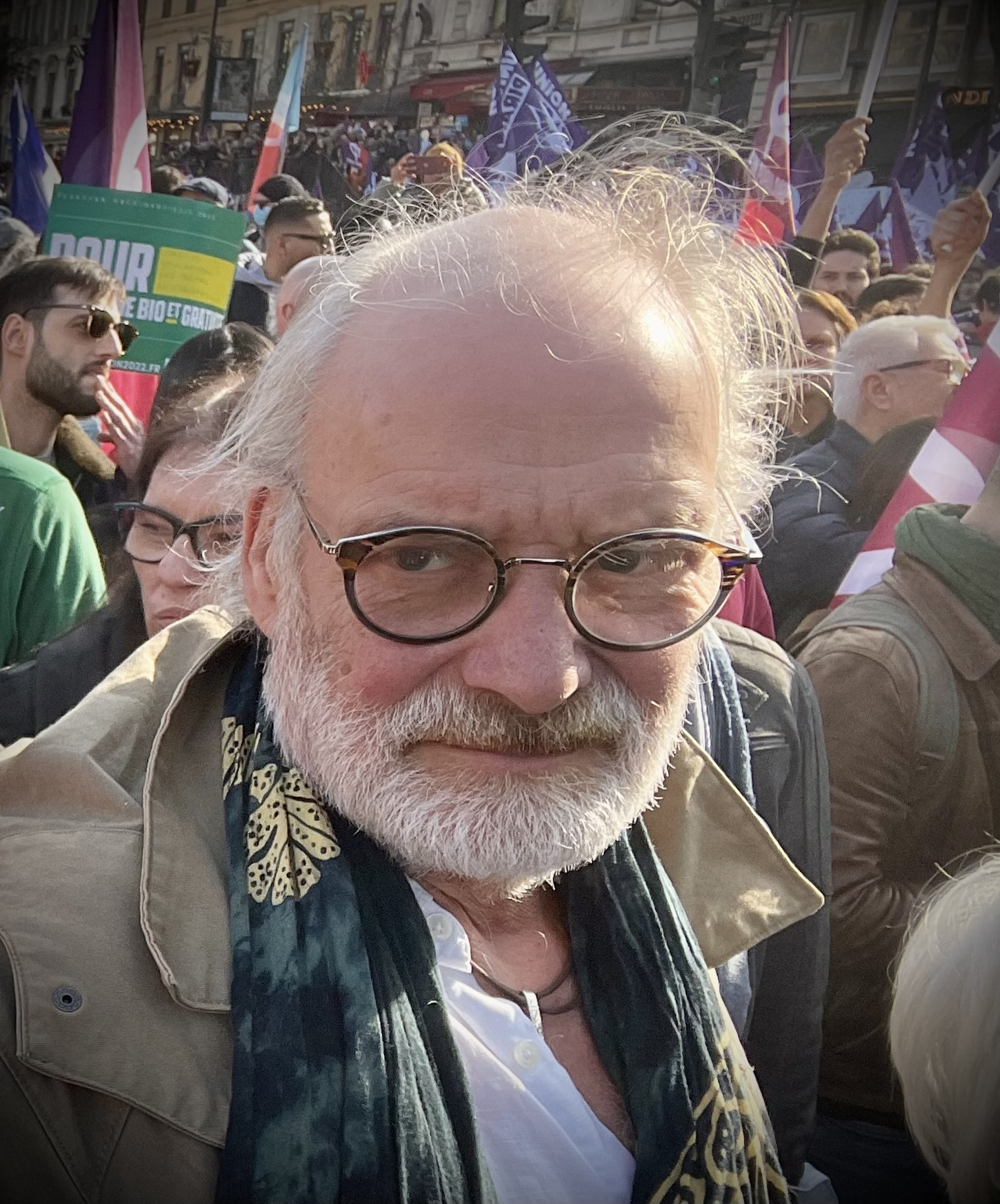
Image of Jehan Cayrecastel

Jean Marie Cayrecastel better known as Jehan (stylized as JeHaN) (born in Montluçon, Allier in 1957) is a French songwriter and singer. He is one of the last itinerant songwriter from the Midi with uninterrupted Trouvère (i.e. French-Speaking Troubadour) tradition.

== Discography ==
- 2007 : Le cul de ma sœur
- 2006 : Compilation Paysâme
- 2006 : Compilation Toulouse en chanson
- 2004 : L'envers de l'ange
- 2001 : Live for Dimey – Made in Toulouse (with Lionel Suarez)
- 1999 : Les ailes de Jehan
- 1998 : Dimey Divin
- 1996 : Paroles de Dimey
