= Léon Jean =

French politician

Léon Jean (25 January 1901 in Lunel-Viel – 12 December 1986) was a French politician. He represented the French Section of the Workers' International (SFIO) in the National Assembly from 1951 to 1955.
