= Jeanne Landre =

French journalist, critic and novelist (1874–1936)

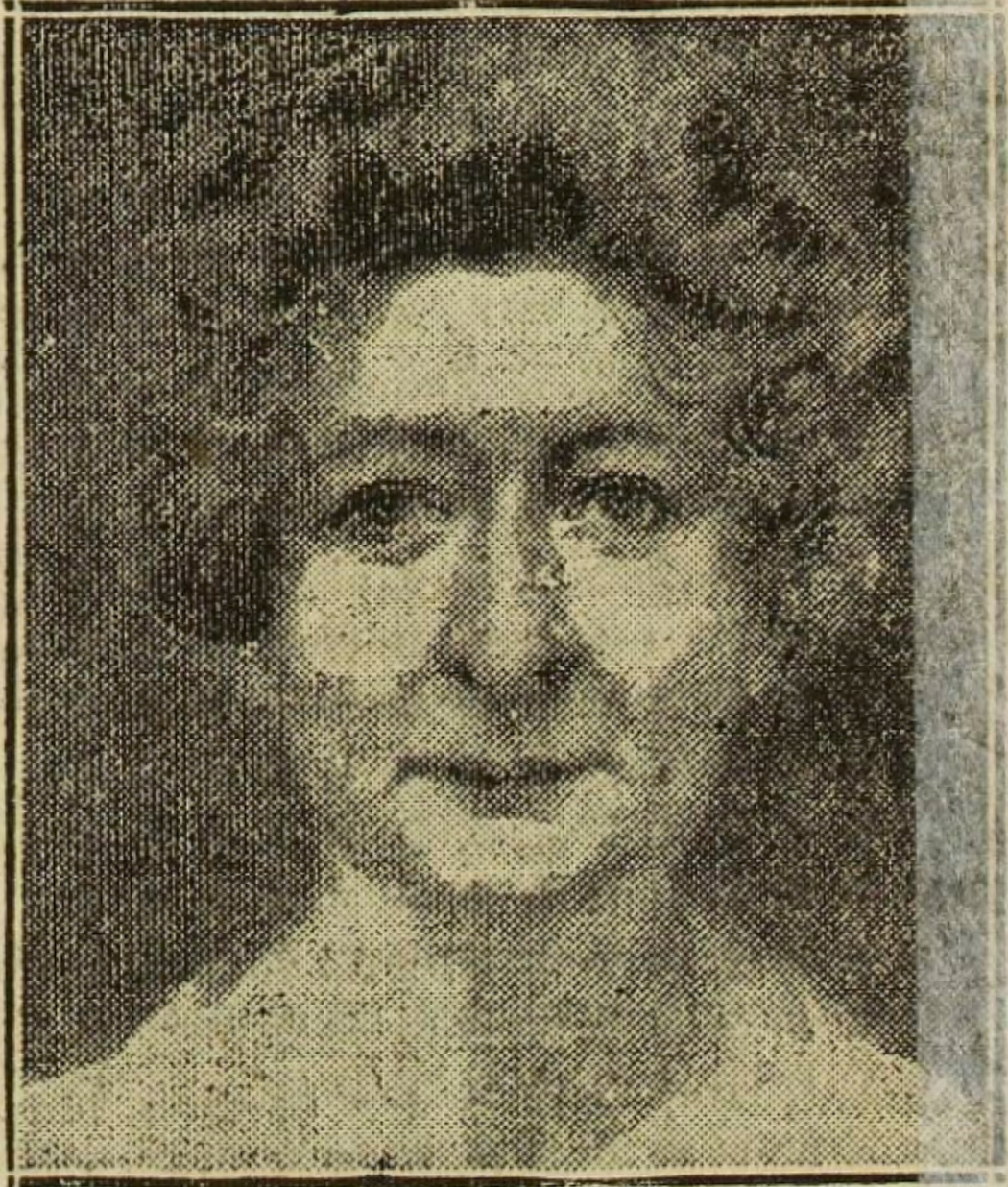
- 1926 portrait of Landre
- Born: 29 December 1874; Paris, France
- Died: 15 November 1936 (aged 61); 6th arrondissement of Paris, France
- Occupations: Journalist; critic; novelist

Jeanne Landre (29 December 1874 – 15 November 1936) was a French journalist, critic and novelist. A 1923 survey of French literature called her "the romancer of Montmartre and the modern disciple of a Mürger still more bohemian than the original". After making her debut in the feminist newspaper La Fronde, run by Marguerite Durand, she became famous very early on.

== Life ==
Jeanne Landre was born in Paris on 29 December 1874 and died in the 6th arrondissement of Paris on 15 November 1936.

== Works ==
- Cri-cri, 1900
- Camelots du roi, 1900
- La gargouille: roman moderne, 1908
- Échalote et ses amants: roman de moeurs montmartroises, 1909
- Contes de Montmartre, 1910
- Échalote continue: roman de moeurs montmartroises, 1910
- Gavarni, 1912
- Puis il mourut, 1916
- L'Ecole des marraines, 1917
- Loin des balles: mémoires d'un philanthrope, 1918
- Bob et Bobette, enfants perdus: roman, 1919
- Madame Poche; ou, La parfaite éducatrice, 1919
- Où va l'amour (cahiers d'une bourgeoise), 1920
- Échalote, douairière: roman, 1925
- Mlle de Rivère, institutrice, 1926
- La parodie galante: roman, 1928
- Aristide Bruant, 1930
- Les Soliloques du pauvre de Jehan Rictus, 1930
- Nouvelles aventures d'Échalote, 1932
- L'idole du beau sexe, le marquis de Létorière, 1938
