= Blue Jeans (1920s song) =

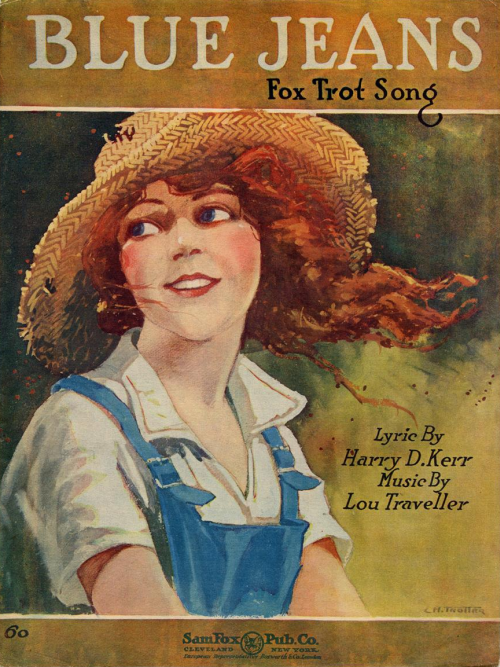
- Sheet music cover

Song
- Written: 1920
- Composer: Lou Traveller
- Lyricist: Harry D. Kerr

"Blue Jeans" (Fox Trot Song) is a sentimental popular song written by Harry D. Kerr and Lou Traveller in 1920. In the song, the singer is reminiscing about a long-ago young love that happened somewhere in the "hills of the old Cumberland." The chorus echoes the singer's longing:

Blue Jeans, the days are lonely,
Blue Jeans, I dream of you,
The Wildwood May days and childhood play days,
Those golden summer hours we knew;
Songbirds are softly calling,
Down where the grass is blue,
The trail up yonder, we used to wander,
There, pretty Blue Jeans, I'll wait for you.

"Blue Jeans" was recorded a number of times, including by the Premier Quartet (Edison Blue Amberol 4288, August 1921) and the Peerless Quartet (Victor 18740, November 1920).

== Bibliography ==
- Kerr, Harry D. (words); Traveller, Lou (music). "Blue Jeans: Fox Trot Song" (sheet music). Cleveland: Sam Fox Pub. Co. (1920).
