= Jeans (surname) =

Jeans is a surname. Those bearing it include:

- Allan Jeans (1933–2011), Australian football coach
- Constance Jeans (1899–1984), English swimmer
- Desmond Jeans (1903-1974), English actor
- Isabel Jeans (1891–1985), English actress
- James Hopwood Jeans (1877–1946), English physicist
- Susi Jeans (1911–1993), Austrian musicologist and teacher
- Ursula Jeans (1906–1973), English actress

== See also ==
- Jeans (disambiguation)
