= Jean-Baptiste Jean =

Haitian painter

Jean-Baptiste Jean (1953–2002) was a Haitian painter. Born in Cap-Haïtien, Jean studied with Philomé Obin before joining the Centre d'Art in 1971. His paintings have been exhibited in the United States, the Dominican Republic, and France.

He is noted for his scenes of everyday life and special occasions in Cap Haïtien and nearby towns and villages. His refined and precise depictions of Cap Haïtien architecture show actual localities, thus provide a kind of historical documentation. He has also done paintings of scenes of important moments in Haitian history, especially those that took place in the northern part of the country.
