= Joan of Navarre =

Joan of Navarre (French: Jeanne de Navarre; Spanish: Juana de Navarra) may refer to:

- Joan I of Navarre (1273–1305), daughter of Henry I of Navarre
- Joan II of Navarre (1312–1349), daughter of Louis I of Navarre
- Joan of Navarre (nun) (1326–1387), daughter of Joan II of Navarre and Philip III of Navarre
- Joan of Navarre, Queen of England (1370–1437), daughter of Charles II of Navarre and wife of Henry IV of England
- Joan of Navarre (regent) (1382–1413), daughter of Charles III of Navarre
- Joan III of Navarre (1528–1572), daughter of Henry II of Navarre
