= Jahanara Khan (Bangladesh) =

Bangladeshi politician

Member of Bangladesh Parliament
- In office 1996–2001

Personal details
- Party: Awami League
- Children: Anwarul Abedin Khan

Jahanara Khan is a Awami League politician and a member of parliament from a reserved seat.

== Early life ==
Jahanara Khan was born in Mymensingh district.

== Political life ==
Khan was elected to parliament from a reserved seat as an Awami League candidate in 1996 from Seat-16.
