= Bourbonnais =

Coordinates: 46.57°N 3.33°E

- Flag Coat of arms

- Country: France
- Seat: Moulins
- Time zone: CET

The Bourbonnais (French: [buʁbɔnɛ]; Occitan: Borbonés) was a historic province in the centre of France that corresponds to the modern département of Allier, along with part of the département of Cher. Its capital was Moulins.

== History ==
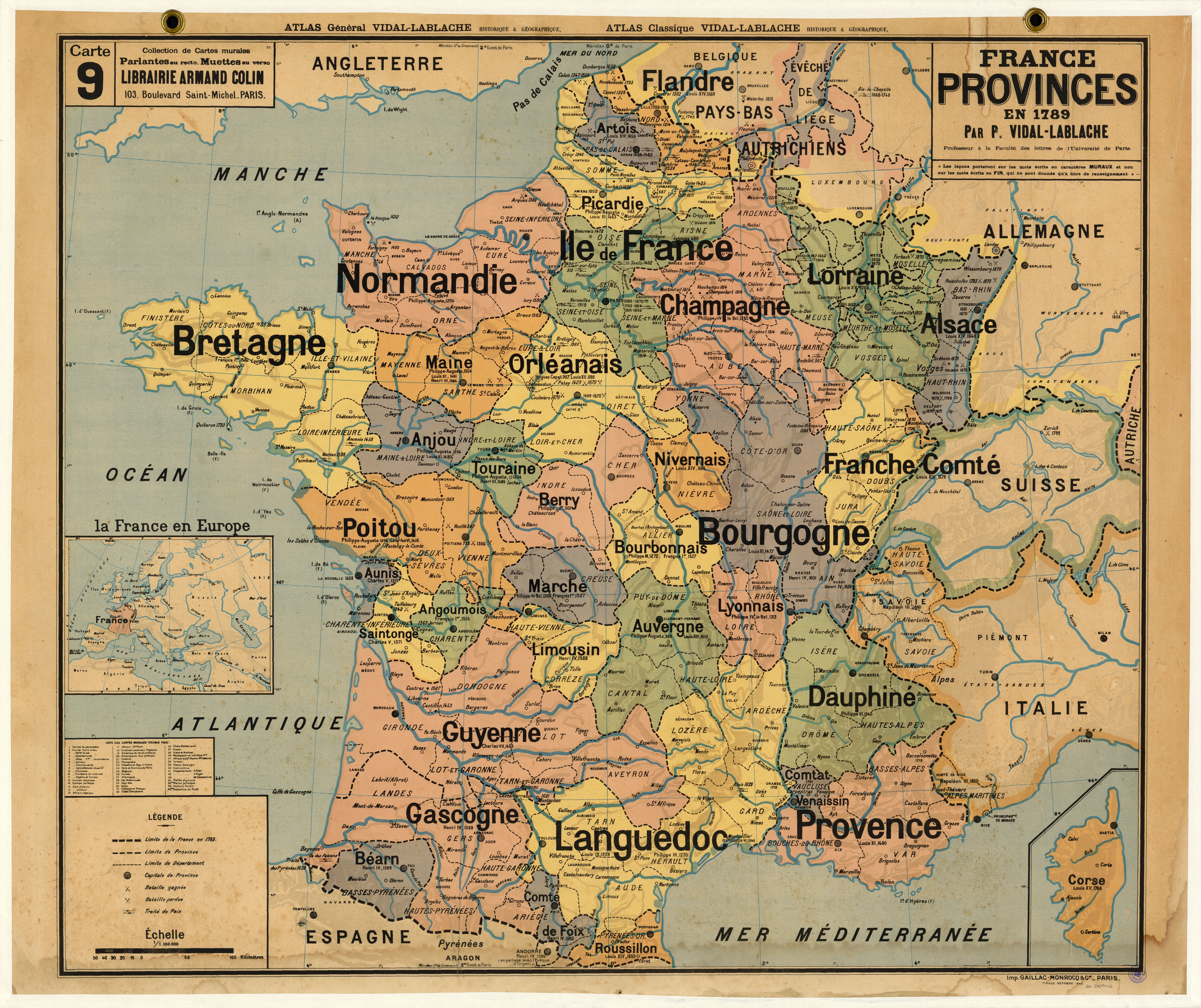
1789 Map of the Provinces of France

The title of the ruler of the Bourbonnais between 913 and 1327, was Sire de Bourbon (Seigneur de Bourbon).

The first lord of the Bourbonnais known by name was Adhémar or Aymon I of Bourbon. Aymon's father was Aymar (894-953), sire of Souvigny, his only son with Ermengarde. Aymar lived during the reign of Charles the Simple who, in 913, gave him fiefs on the river Allier in which would become the Bourbonnais. He acquired the castle of Bourbon (today Bourbon-l'Archambault). Almost all early lords took the name d'Archambaud, after the palace, but later the family became known as the House of Bourbon(-Archambaud).

The first House of Bourbon ended in 1196, with the death of Archambault VII, who had only one heir, Mathilde of Bourbon. She married Guy II of Dampierre, who added Montluçon to the possessions of the lords of Bourbon. The second house of Bourbon started in 1218, with Archambaud VIII, son of Guy II and Mahaut, and brother of William II of Dampierre. He was followed by his son Archambaud IX, who died in Cyprus in 1249, during a crusade. The House of Burgundy then acquired the Bourbonnais by the marriage of Agnes of Dampierre, daughter of Archambaud IX, to John of Burgundy.

In 1272, Beatrice of Burgundy (1258–1310), Lady of Bourbon, married Robert de France (1256–1318), Count of Clermont, son of king Louis IX (Saint-Louis). Thus began the long-lasting House of Bourbon, which would provide the kings of France from Henry IV in 1589 to Louis-Philippe in 1848, when France abolished its monarchy.

The Bourbons had concluded an alliance with the royal power. They put their forces at the service of the king, thus benefitting from the geographic position of the Bourbonnais, located between the royal domains and the duchies of Aquitaine and Auvergne. This alliance, as well as the marriage of Béatrix de Bourgogne and Robert de France, aided the rise and prosperity of the province. In 1327, King Charles (le Bel) elevated the Bourbonnais to the status of a duchy.

== Shields and armorial bearings ==
First coat of arms of the Bourbonnais

Old armorial bearings : d'azur semé de fleurs de lys d'or et à la bande de gueules

Modern armorial bearings: d'azur aux trois fleurs de lys d'or et à la bande de gueules
