= Chandra Kanta Devi Malla =

Nepalese activist and teacher

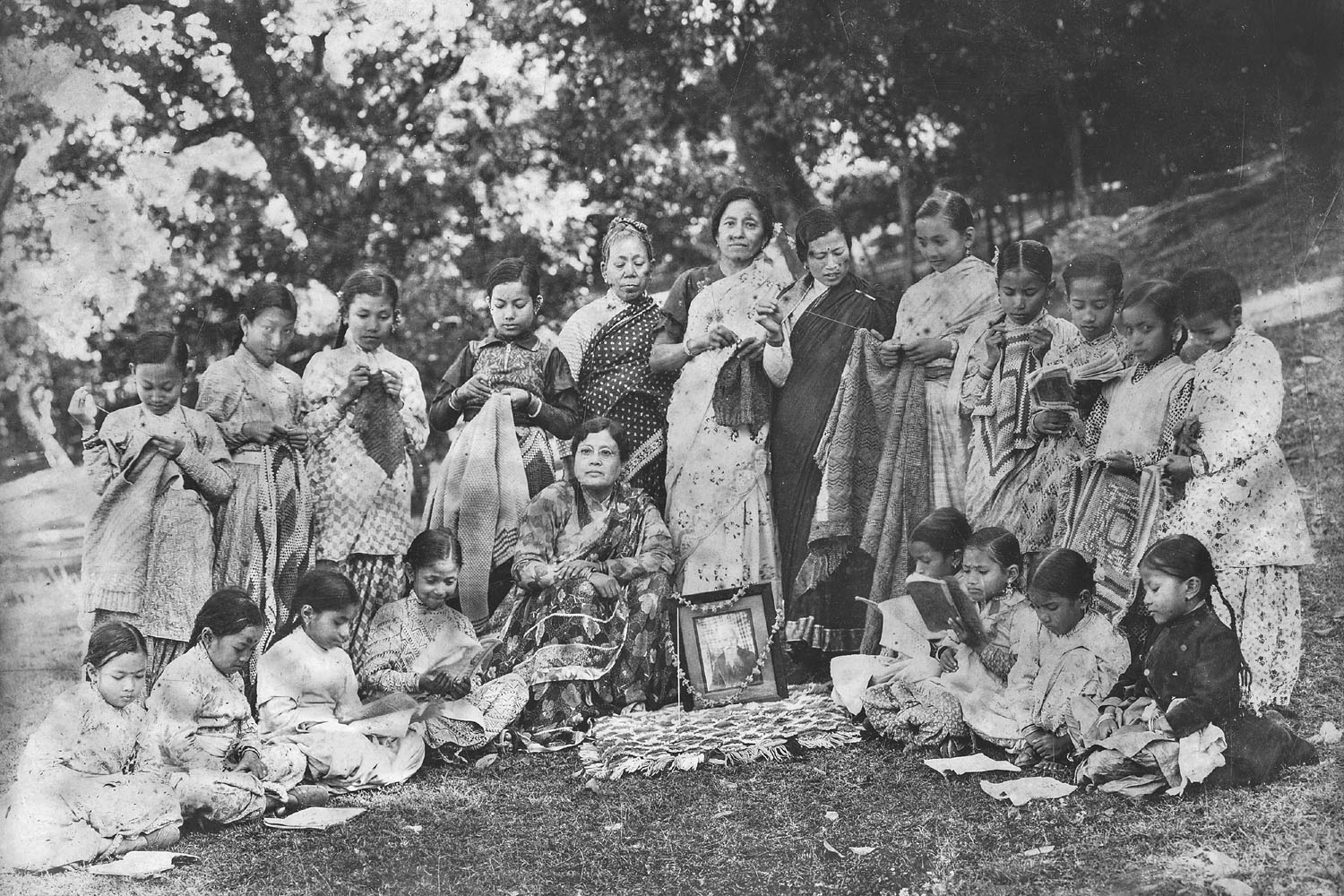
- Malla in c. 1935 with her students
- Born: 1897; Lalitpur, Nepal
- Died: 1986 (aged 88–89); Nepal
- Other names: Chandra Kanta Devi
- Relatives: Shukraraj Shastri (brother)

Chandra Kanta Devi Malla (Nepali: चन्द्रकान्तदेवी मल्ल) was a Nepalese activist and teacher.

In 1897, Malla was born in Lalitpur, Nepal to Hindu reformist Madhavraj Joshi. She is also the sister of Shukraraj Shastri, a democracy activist, and a martyr.

At the age of 18, she married Umeshwar Lal Malla, later he left her. She worked at Kaiser Mahal as a maid.

In 1933, Malla received permission from the Ranas to open a girls' school. She later recalled that "while walking to the school and coming back home, people used to stare at me, as if I was a princess". The school was inaugurated by Juddha Shumsher Jung Bahadur Rana. In 1941, her brother Shukraraj was sentenced to death by hanging by the state, which devastated Malla.

In 1961, she opened Shukraraj Shastri School, named after her brother. She died in 1986.

Malla is also referred to as the first guruama (feminine guru) in Nepal.
