= Jeanne Carstensen =

American journalist and author

- Born: Portland, Oregon, U.S.
- Occupations: Journalist, author
- Notable work: A Greek Tragedy: One Day, a Deadly Shipwreck, and the Human Cost of the Refugee Crisis
- Awards: National Arts Journalism Program Fellowship, Columbia University; Logan Nonfiction Program Fellowship; Mesa Refuge Fellowship (Peter Barnes Long-form Journalism honoree)

Jeanne Carstensen is an American journalist and author recognized for her reporting on the Syrian refugee crisis and her roles as a managing editor for prominent media outlets. She has contributed to The New York Times, Foreign Policy, The Nation, and Salon.

== Career ==
Carstensen served as the executive managing editor of The Bay Citizen, which produced the Bay Area pages of The New York Times, and as managing editor at Salon. Earlier in her career, she worked in Costa Rica as a shortwave radio producer and translator.

Her journalism has focused heavily on refugee issues, particularly in Greece, Turkey, and across Europe. With support from the Pulitzer Center on Crisis Reporting, her coverage of the crisis in 2015 on the Greek island of Lesbos—where more than 500,000 refugees arrived—highlighted the impact on local communities, many of whom were themselves descendants of Greek refugees from Asia Minor in 1922. This body of work led to her being shortlisted for the Immigration Journalism Awards.

== Recognition and Fellowships ==
Carstensen's honors include:

- Columbia University National Arts Journalism Program Fellowship
- Logan Nonfiction Program Fellowship
- Mesa Refuge Fellowship, where she was named the Peter Barnes Long-form Journalism honoree

== Personal life ==
Born in Portland, Oregon, Carstensen has lived in several countries, including France, Greece, and Costa Rica. She resides in San Francisco and is a member of the Castro Writers' Cooperative.

== Published Works ==
Her book, "A Greek Tragedy: One Day, a Deadly Shipwreck, and the Human Cost of the Refugee Crisis," was published by Atria/One Signal Publishers in 2025. In January 2026, "A Greek Tragedy" was named a finalist for the 2026 PEN/John Kenneth Galbraith Award for Nonfiction.
