= Jeanny Canby =

American archaeologist and scholar (1929–2007)

- Born: Jeanny Esther Vorys; July 14, 1929; Columbus, Ohio
- Died: November 18, 2007 (aged 79); Haverford, Pennsylvania
- Education: Bryn Mawr College; University of Chicago
- Known for: Restoration of Ur-Nammu stele at the Penn Museum
- Scientific career
- Fields: Archaeology of the Ancient Near East

Jeanny Vorys Canby (July 14, 1929 – November 18, 2007) was an American archaeologist and scholar of the ancient Near East. She is best known for her restoration of the Ur-Nammu stele.

== Early life ==
Jeanny Esther Vorys was born in Columbus, Ohio. Her father, John Martin Vorys, was a congressman. She studied at Bryn Mawr College, obtained a post-graduate degree in archaeology from the University of Chicago, and returned to Bryn Mawr for her doctoral degree.

In 1959, she married Thomas Yellott Canby, a science editor and writer for National Geographic magazine. They had two sons; they later divorced.

== Career ==
Following her doctorate, Canby joined an excavation at Hattusa in Turkey, an ancient Hittite site. She studied falconry and determined that this was a recreational pursuit among the Hittites.

Canby worked as a curator at the Ancient Near East wing of the Walters Art Gallery in Baltimore for seventeen years. She lectured at Johns Hopkins University, and was a visiting professor at Columbia University in New York. Her main focus continued to be the conservation and research of archaeological items.

Following her retirement, Canby became a volunteer at the Penn Museum in Philadelphia. Her study of a nine-foot tall pillar, the Ur-Nammu stele, revealed that its restoration was faulty. Its reconstruction in 1925 had been supervised remotely by Leonard Woolley, but having been based on imprecise photographs, was wrongly assembled. Canby found that several parts of the stele had remained unincorporated, including an adult hand on the shoulder of a god, with tiny feet in its lap. By removing the plaster that filled missing parts of the stele, and by putting back pieces she found in the museum's storerooms, she was able to determine that the feet belonged not to a baby, but a woman embracing the deity. She called it an "amazingly intimate scene for a royal monument."

== Later life ==
In 1991, Canby spotted a 2,000-year-old Egyptian statuette of Osiris at an antique store in Philadelphia. Recognising it as stolen from the Penn Museum, she reported the find to the Federal Bureau of Investigation, who traced it back to a local garage sale. From there they were able to locate another property of the museum, a Chinese crystal ball, that had been stolen at the same time as the statuette.

Jeanny Vorys died on November 18, 2007, of emphysema in Haverford, Pennsylvania. Her extensive library was donated by her sons to the British School of Archaeology in Iraq, of which she was a long-standing member.

== Selected publications ==
=== Articles ===
- "Early Bronze 'Trinket' Moulds". Iraq. 27. 1965.
- "Some Hittite Figurines in the Aegean" (PDF). Hesperia. XXXVII. 1969.
- "Decorated Garments in Ashurnasirpal's Sculpture". Iraq. 33. 1971.
- "The Stelenreihen at Assur, Tel Halaf, and Massebôt". Iraq. 38. 1976.
- "Guzana (Tel-Halaf)". Ebla to Damascus: Art and Archaeology of Ancient Syria. 1986. ISBN 978-0865280298.
- "The Child in Hittite Iconography". Ancient Anatolia: Aspects of Change and Cultural Development, Essays in Honor of Machteld J. Mellink. University of Wisconsin. 1986.
- "A Monumental Puzzle". Expedition Magazine. Vol. 29, no. 1. March 1987. ISSN 0014-4738.
- Canby, Jeanny Vorys (July 2002). "Falconry (Hawking) in Hittite Lands". Journal of Near Eastern Studies. 61 (3): 161–201. doi:10.1086/469022. JSTOR 3128920. S2CID 162303334.

=== Books ===
- The Ancient Near East in the Walters Art Gallery. Baltimore. 1974.
- The "Ur-Nammu" Stela. Penn Museum. 2006. ISBN 978-1-931707-89-3.
