= Jahanara Begum (social worker) =

Bangladeshi social worker

- জাহানারা বেগম
- Occupation: Social worker

Jahanara Begum is a Bangladeshi social worker. Begum, known as the "Queen of Cottage Industry" in Bangladesh, has carried out transformative work in the rural development sector. Born in Comilla, Begum has promoted economic independence for women through cottage industries, focusing on skills like embroidery and handicrafts. By organising training programs and workshops, she helped women earn livelihoods and gain financial independence.

She was awarded the Independence Day Award in 1993 by the government of Bangladesh.

== Background and career ==
Begum was born to Azmat Ali. She was married to Moninul Islam Miyagi. After the wedding, she moved to Adda village of Barura Upazila.

Begum wrote books on cottage industry and its development and history:

- Comilla Shilpo Bishok Pustak (1976)
- Bashtobayone Adda Grame Kutir Shipler Oboshon (1976)
- Jahan Ara's Kutir Shilpo Rushiar (1980)
- Embroidery Design Pustak (1984)
- Dorji Biddya Shikka (1986)
- Kutir Shilper Jari Ghan (1988)
- Kutir Shilpo (1988)
- Utpadito Pather Shochitro Catalog (1990)

== Awards ==
- Kutir Shilper Kandari by the then governor Azam Khan (1962)
- The Comilla Foundation Gold Medal (1977 and 1985)
- National Social Welfare Award (1988)
- Independence Day Award (1993)
- The Rotary Club Award (2000)
- Shada Moner Manush
