= Ashesh Malla =

Nepalese writer and theatre director

Ashesh Malla (Nepali: अशेष मल्ल; born 1954) is a Nepali playwright, theatre director, and Co-founder/artistic director of Sarwanam Theatre Group, established 1982.

Ashesh Malla is also involved in street theatre in Nepal.
