= Sarwanam Theatre Group =

Sarwanam Theatre is a non-profit Nepalese theatre group co-founded by Ashesh Malla.Organized to perform street theater, Sarwanam performs plays which focus on social issues in Nepal.

The group has developed the Sarwanam Art Centre in Putali Sadak, Kalikasthan, Kathmandu, which houses a theatre auditorium, cafeteria, art gallery, workshop hall and research centre. It does not bear any governmental or non governmental funding. The building's construction was funded through the presentation of theatrical performances. The concept of Sarwanam Theater Building came from Ashesh Malla, the founder of Sarwanam Theater.

Sarwanam has given performances in collaboration with The Asia Foundation, UNMIN, UNFPA, and Save the Children.
