= Jahanara Ahmed =

Bangladeshi actor

- Occupation: Actress

Jahanara Ahmed is a Bangladeshi television actress. She was awarded Ekushey Padak in 2016 by the government of Bangladesh in arts (television and film) category.

== Career ==
Ahmed joined Bangladesh Betar in 1962 in a live programme Jibontika. She acted in her first radio play directed by Kazi Khaleq.

Ahmed was selected as an announcer of Bangladesh Television in 1964. She has acted in many drama serials and plays on television, including Shokal Shondhya, Shangshaptak, Shuktara, Ramer Shumoti, Purono Baksho, Ashamapto Kahini, Amader Shontanera, Kuhelika, Chokher Bali and Bela Abela.
