= Jihan Malla =

Lebanese voice actress

Jihan Mulla
- جيهان الملا
- Occupations: Television personality, voice actress

Jihan Malla (Arabic: جيهان الملا) is a Lebanese Television personality and voice actress.

== Filmography ==
=== Animation ===
- Batman: The Animated Series (Lebanese dub)
- Over the Garden Wall
- Matt Hatter Chronicles - Meg
- Mr. Bean - Mrs. Juila Wicket
- Teen Titans Go! - Gizmo (Cartoon Network Arabic version), Jinx (MBC3 version)
- Steven Universe - Ruby (Jail Break episode)
- The Amazing World of Gumball - Nicole Watterson
- Uncle Grandpa
- The Fairly OddParents - Wanda (Classical Arabic version)

=== Video games ===
- Assassin's Creed: Syndicate (credited as Jihane Malla)
- Tom Clancy's The Division (credited as Jihane Malla)
