= Joanna =

- Pronunciation: /dʒoʊˈænə/
- Gender: Female

Origin
- Origin: Hebrew > Greek > Latin
- Meaning: God is gracious

Other names
- Related names: Jan, Jane, Janet, Janice, Jean, Jenna, Jenny, Joan, Joana, Joann, Joanne, Johanna

Joanna is a feminine given name deriving from Koine Greek: Ἰωάννα, romanized: Iōanna from Hebrew: יוֹחָנָּה, romanized: Yôḥānnāh, lit. 'God is gracious'. Variants in English include Joan, Joann, Joanne, and Johanna. Other forms of the name in English are Jan, Jane, Janet, Janice, Jean, and Jeanne.

The earliest recorded occurrence of the name Joanna, in Luke 8:3, refers to the disciple "Joanna the wife of Chuza," who was an associate of Mary Magdalene. Her name as given is Greek in form, although it ultimately originated from the Hebrew masculine name יְהוֹחָנָן Yəhôḥānān or יוֹחָנָן Yôḥānān meaning 'God is gracious'. In Greek this name became Ιωαννης Iōannēs, from which Iōanna was derived by giving it a feminine ending. The name Joanna, like Yehohanan, was associated with Hasmonean families. Saint Joanna was culturally Hellenized, thus bearing the Grecian adaptation of a Jewish name, as was commonly done in her milieu.

At the beginning of the Christian era, the names Iōanna and Iōannēs were already common in Judea. The name Joanna and its equivalents became popular for women "all at once" beginning in the 12th century in Navarre and the south of France. In England, the name did not become current until the 19th century.

The original Latin form Joanna was used in English to translate the equivalents in other languages; for example, Juana la Loca is known in English as Joanna the Mad. The variant form Johanna originated in Latin in the Middle Ages, by analogy with the Latin masculine name Johannes. The Greek form lacks a medial -h- because in Greek /h/ could only occur initially.

The Hebrew name יוֹחָנָה Yôḥānāh forms a feminine equivalent in Hebrew for the name Joanna and its variants. The Christian Arabic form of John is يوحنّا Yūḥannā, based on the Judeo-Aramaic form of the name. For Joanna, Arabic translations of the Bible use يونّا Yuwannā based on Syriac ܝܘܚܢ Yoanna, which in turn is based on the Greek form Iōanna.

Sometimes in modern English Joanna is reinterpreted as a compound of the two names Jo and Anna, and therefore given a spelling like JoAnna, Jo-Anna, or Jo Anna. However, the original name Joanna is a single unit, not a compound. The names Hannah, Anna, Anne, Ann are etymologically related to Joanna just the same: they are derived from Hebrew חַנָּה Ḥannāh 'grace' from the same verbal root meaning 'to be gracious'.

The name Joanna in Kurdish is based on the Kurdish word for 'beautiful', ciwan, which is derived from a separate etymology: Proto-Iranian *HyúHā from Proto-Indo-European *h₂yéwHō, 'young', making it a cognate of Persian javān and Italian giovane 'young', as well as English young. The secondary meaning of 'beautiful' has developed in Northwest Iranian languages.

== In other languages ==
- Amharic - ዮሐና Yohäna
- Albanian - Xhoana
- Arabic - يُوَنّا Yuwannā
- Armenian - Յովհաննա (Hovhanna), Օհաննա (Ōhanna)
- Basque language - Jone, Joana, Joane
- Breton - Janed
- Bulgarian - Йоана (Joana/Yoana), Ivana, Yana; diminutive: Яниџa (Yanizza, Yanitza, Yanitsa)
- Catalan - Joana
- Chinese - Modern 喬安娜 Qiáo ān nà (literally 'tall, peaceful, graceful'), Biblical 約亞拿 Yāo yà ná
- Croatian - Ivana, Jana, Janja
- Czech - Jana, Johana
- Danish - Johanne
- Dawan - Yohana
- Dutch - Johanna, Joanna, diminutives Joke, Janneke
- Estonian - Joanna, Johanna
- Finnish - Johanna, Joanna, Jonna, Janette, Janna, Jaana, Hanne
- Filipino - Juana
- French - Jeanne, diminutive Jeannette, Janine, Old French - Jehane
- Galician - Xoana
- Georgian - იოანნა Ioanna
- German - Johanna, diminutive Hanne
- Greek - Ἰωάννα (Ioanna), Modern Greek - Γιάννα (Giánna), diminutive Γιαννούλα Yannoula
- Hebrew - יוחנה Yoḥanah, יוהנה Yohannah
- Hindi - जोहन्ना Johanna
- Hungarian - Johanna, Jana, diminutive Hanna, Janka
- Icelandic - Jóhanna
- Indonesian - Yohana, Joanna, Ivana, Johanna, Joane, Juana, Nina
- Irish - Siobhán (after French Jeanne), diminutive Sinéad (after French Jeannette)
- Italian - Giovanna, diminutive Gianna, Giannina, Vanna, Nina, Zana, Ivana
- Kurdish - Joanna, Juana, Jwana
- Korean - Modern 조안나 Joanna, Biblical 요안나 Yoanna
- Latin - Joanna, Johanna
- Lithuanian - Joana
- Macedonian - Ivana, diminutive Ива (Iva); Јована (Jovana), diminutives Јованка (Jovanka), Јовка (Jovka), Yana
- Malayalam - യോഹന്ന Yōhannā
- Persian - جوانا Jovannā
- Polish - Joanna, Janina, Żaneta, diminutive Joasia, Asia, Asieńka, Aśka, Asiunia, Nina, Ninka, Żanetka
- Portuguese - Joana
- Romanian - Ioana
- Russian - Яна (Yana), Жанна (Zhanna), Иoaннa (Ioanna, Greek form); diminutives Янина (Yanina), Яника (Yanika)
- Serbian - Јована (Jovana), diminutive Јованка (Jovanka)
- Slovak - Jana
- Slovenian - Jana
- Spanish - Juana, diminutive Juanita, Nita
- Swedish - Johanna, diminutive Hanna
- Syriac - ܝܘܚܢ Yoanna
- Tamil - யோவன்னா Yōvannā
- Tetum - Joana
- Ukrainian - Іванна (Ivanna), Іоанна (Ioanna)
- Vèneto - Joana (pronounced /jo'ana/ and /dʒo'ana/)
- Welsh - Siân

== Women named Joanna ==
=== Religion ===
- Saint Joanna, one of the women associated with the ministry of Mary Magdalene. She brought myrrh to Christ's sepulcher and helped discover the empty tomb (Luke 24:10).
- Joanna (prioress of Lothen), twelfth century nun
- Joanna Southcott (1750–1814), English prophetess

=== Royals and noblewomen ===
- Joanna of Constantinople (c. 1199–1244), Countess of Flanders
- Joan of Flanders, Countess of Montfort (c. 1295–1374), Duchess of Brittany
- Joanna, Duchess of Brabant (1322–1406)
- Joanna, Duchess of Durazzo (1344–1387)
- Joanna I of Naples (1325–1382)
- Joanna of Bourbon (1338–1378)
- Joanna II of Naples (1371–1435)
- Joanna of Navarre (c. 1368–1437), consort of King Henry IV of England
- Saint Joana, Crown Princess of Portugal (1452–1490)
- Joanna of Castile (1479–1555), queen regnant of Castile, known as Joanna the Mad
- Joanna of Austria, Princess of Portugal (1535–1573)
- Joanna of Austria, Grand Duchess of Tuscany (1547–1578)
- Joanna Nobilis Sombre (c. 1753–1836), Begum Samru of Sardhana
- Princess Joanna of Courland (1783–1876)

=== Other ===
- Joanna Ampil, Filipina musical theater actress and singer
- Joanna Angel (born 1980), American porn actress
- Joanna Baillie (1762–1851), Scottish poet and playwright
- Joanna Barnden (born 1972), British author of historical fiction
- Joanna Barnes (1934–2022), American actress
- Joanna Bending, British actress
- Joanna Bolme (born 1968), American indie rock musician
- Joanna Briscoe (born 1963), English novelist
- Joanna Broniewska-Kozicka (1929–1954), Polish filmmaker
- Joanna Brouk (1949–2017), American composer
- Joanna Bruzdowicz (1943–2021), Polish composer
- Joanna Byrne, Irish politician
- Joanna Cameron (1951–2021), American actress
- Joanna Cassidy (born 1945), American actress
- Joanna Clark (born 1938), American nun, naval officer, and activist
- Joanna Cole (disambiguation), several people
- Joanna Connor (born 1962), American blues musician
- Joanna David (born 1947), British actress
- Joanna Denny (died 2006), British historian
- Joanna Dennehy (born 1982), British serial killer
- Jo-Anna Downey (1967–2016), Canadian comedian
- Joanna Dong (born 1981), Singaporean singer-songwriter
- Jo Anna Dossett, American politician
- Joanna Dukes, English actress
- Joanna Dunham (1936–2014), British actress
- Joanna Eden, British jazz singer
- Joanna Forest, British classical crossover singer
- Joanna Gaines (born 1978), American reality TV personality
- Joanna Garcia (born 1979), American actress
- Joanna Glass (born 1936), Canadian playwright
- Joanna Gleason (born 1950), Canadian actress
- Joanna Going (born 1963), American actress
- Joanna (singer) (born 1957), stage name of Brazilian singer Maria de Fátima Gomes Nogueira
- Joanna Gosling (born 1971), British journalist
- Joanna Haigh (born 1954), British physicist and academic
- Joanna Harcourt-Smith (1946–2020), Swiss writer
- Joanna Hausmann (born 1989), Venezuelan-American comedian, actress, and writer
- Joanna Hayes (born 1976), American gold medalist in the 2004 Olympics
- Joanna Hiffernan (1843–1903), artist's model and muse from Ireland
- Joanna Hoffman (born 1953), Polish-born American computer executive
- Joanna Jędrzejczyk (born 1987), Polish mixed martial artists
- Joanna Kerns (born 1953), American actress
- Joanna Klepko (born 1983), Polish singer
- Joanna Krupa (born 1979), Polish-American model and actress
- Joanna Kulig (born 1982), Polish actress
- Joanna Levesque (born 1990), American singer
- Joanna Lee (1931–2003), American screenwriter, actress, and producer
- Joanna Lewerentz (born 1992), Swedish politician
- Joanna Lumley (born 1946), English actress and former model
- JoAnna M. Lund (1944–2006), American author and cook
- Joanna MacGregor (born 1959), British classical, jazz, and contemporary pianist
- Joanna Macy (born 1929), American Buddhist scholar, author, and environmental activist
- Joanna de Albuquerquen Maranhão Bezerra de Melo (born 1987), Brazilian Olympic swimmer
- Joanna Isabel Mayer (1904–1991), American mathematician and educator
- Joanna McGrenere, Canadian computer scientist
- Joanna Merlin (1931–2023), American actress and casting director
- Joanna Moore (1934–1997), American actress
- Joanna Murray-Smith (born 1962), Australian author
- Joanna Newsom (born 1982), American harpist, singer, and songwriter
- Joanna Norris, New Zealand journalist
- Joanna Pacitti (born 1984), American singer, known simply as Joanna
- Joanna Page (born 1977), Welsh actress
- Joanna Pacuła (born 1957), Polish actress
- Joanna Palani (born 1993), Kurdish author and Peshmerga fighter
- Joanna Parrish (1969–1990), English student murdered in France in 1990
- Joanna Pearson, American writer
- Joanna Pettet (born 1942), British actress
- Joanna Phillips-Lane, British actress
- Joanna Pousette-Dart (born 1947), American artist
- Joanna Roos (1901–1989), American actress and playwright
- Joanna Roth (born 1965), Danish-British actress
- Joanna Russ (1937–2011), American science fiction author known for her writing on radical feminist themes
- Joanna Scanlan (born 1961), English actress and television writer
- Joanna Mary Berry Shields (1884–1965), American educator
- Joanna Shimkus (born 1943), Canadian actress
- Joanna Siedlecka (born 1949), Polish writer and journalist
- Joanna Simon (mezzo-soprano) (1936–2022), American opera singer
- Joanna Simon (wine), British author and wine journalist
- Joanna Smolarek (born 1965), Polish track and field sprinter
- Joanna St. Claire, American singer and songwriter
- Joanna Stern (born 1984), American technology journalist
- Joanna Stone (born 1972), Australian javelin thrower
- Joanna Sutton (born 1986), Australian netball player
- Joanna Tope (1944–2024), English actress
- Joanna Trollope (1943–2025), British novelist
- Joanna Truffaut (born 1977), French digital transformation advisor and entrepreneur
- Joanna Wallace, British novelist
- Joanna Wang (Wáng Ruòlín) (born 1988), Taiwanese singer and songwriter
- Joanna Whaley, American politician
- Joanna Werners (born 1953), Surinamese-born Dutch author
- Joanna Wichmann (1905–1985), German-born textile artist and embroiderer
- Joanna Wilson (born 1970), Canadian aquatic toxicologist and physiologist
- Joanna Woodall (born 1956), British art historian
- Joanna Yeates (1985–2010), English landscape architect and victim in a high-profile 2010 murder case
- Joanna Zeiger (born 1970), American Olympic and world champion triathlete, and author

== Fictional characters ==
- Joanna Beauchamp, the lead character in Melissa de la Cruz's novel Witches of East End and the TV show made from it
- Joanna Chambers, a scientist from the Power of Five series by Anthony Horowitz
- Joanna Dark, the main character in Perfect Dark
- Joanna Eberhart, the protagonist of The Stepford Wives by Ira Levin
- Joanna “Joey” Del Marco, a character in the Netflix series Grand Army
- The title character in the 1973 Brazilian film Joanna Francesa, played by Jeanne Moreau
- Joanna Beth "Jo" Harvelle, a hunter on Supernatural
- Joanna the Goanna, a pet lizard to antagonist Percival McLeach in Disney's The Rescuers Down Under
- The protagonist of the 1968 British film Joanna
- Joanna McCoy, daughter of Leonard McCoy of Star Trek
- Joanna May, title character in The Cloning of Joanna May, a science fiction novel by Fay Weldon
- Jo Parrish, a police constable on Blue Heelers
- Jo Polniaczek on The Facts of Life
- Lieutenant Joanna Reece on Forever
- Joanna Cargill (Frenzy), a mutant character appearing in X-Men comics
- Joanna "Granny Jojo" Watterson, paternal grandmother of the titular character of The Amazing World of Gumball

== Women named Ioanna ==
- Ioanna Anagnostopoulou (born 1997), Greek rhythmic gymnast
- Ioanna Avraam, Cypriot ballet dancer
- Ioanna Babassika, Greek human rights lawyer
- Ioanna Chatziioannou (born 1973), retired female weightlifter from Greece
- Ioanna Filippou (born 1995), Cypriot beauty pageant title holder
- Ioanna Fotiadou (born 1977), Greek handball player
- Ioanna Karyofylli, Greek local politician
- Ioanna Karystiani (born 1952), Greek screenwriter
- Ioanna Kimbook, Cypriot actress
- Ioanna Kondouli, Greek politician and topographer engineer
- İoanna Kuçuradi (born 1936), Turkish philosopher
- Ioanna Lytrivi (born 1982), Greek politician
- Ioanna Morfessis, American businesswoman
- Ioanna Papantoniou (1936–2026), Greek author, scenic designer, costume designer and folklorist
- Ioanna Sfekas-Karvelas (born 1950), Greek American dramatic soprano
- Ioanna Stamatopoulou (born 1998), Greek water polo player
- Ioanna Tantcheva (born 1989), Bulgarian group rhythmic gymnast
- Ioanna Vlachou (born 1981), Greek volleyball player

== See also ==
- Joanne (given name)
