= Johanna (disambiguation) =

Johanna is a feminine name.

Johanna may also refer to:

== Places ==
- Johanna, Victoria, a beach resort in Australia
- 127 Johanna, asteroid
- Johanna, Culemborg, a windmill in Gelderland, Netherlands
- Johanna, former name for the island of Anjouan, Comoros

== Songs ==
- "Johanna (Shut Up!)", a 2007 song from The Power of Shower by Crazy Loop
- "Johanna", 2019, by Suki Waterhouse
- "Johanna", 1988, by The Stooges
- "Johanna", three songs in Sweeney Todd: The Demon Barber of Fleet Street

== Other uses ==
- Johanna (barge), a preserved working boat in Belgium
- Johanna (East Indiaman), a British ship active c. 1671–1681
- Johanna (film), a 2005 Hungarian musical
- Johanna (TV series), a 1989 East German series about a Berlin tram

== See also ==
- Lake Johanna Township, Pope County, Minnesota
- Johanna Kustannus, a Finnish record label
- Joanna (disambiguation)
- Joanne (disambiguation)
