= Joanna (disambiguation) =

Joanna is a female given name.

Joanna may also refer to:

== Films ==
- Joanna (1925 film), a lost American silent film
- Joanna (1968 film), a 1968 British drama film
- Joanna (1985 film), a failed ABC pilot directed by Greg Antonacci
- Joanna (2010 film), directed by Feliks Falk
- Joanna (2013 film), a documentary film nominated for an Academy Award
- Joanna, a goanna in the film The Rescuers Down Under

== Songs ==
- "Joanna" (JoJo song), 2019
- "Joanna" (Kool & the Gang song), 1983
- "Joanna" (Scott Walker song), 1968
- "Joanna", by Cris Williamson
- "Joanna", by Kim Larsen
- "Joanna", by Superpitcher
- "Joanna", by Little Comets
- "Joanna", by S. Kiyotaka & Omega Tribe
- "Joanna (Shut Up!)", by Crazy Loop from The Power of Shower

== Maritime vessels ==
- Johanna (East Indiaman) or Joanna, a ship of the British East India Company lost in 1682
- USS Joanna (SP-1963), a United States Navy patrol boat in commission from 1917 to 1920

== Places ==
In Australia

- Joanna, South Australia

In the United States

- Joanna, Missouri, a ghost town
- Joanna, Pennsylvania, an unincorporated community
- Joanna, South Carolina, a census-designated place
- Lake Joanna, Florida

== Other uses ==
- Joanna (opera), an 1802 opera by Étienne Méhul, libretto by Benoît-Joseph Marsollier
- Joanna (skipper), a genus of butterflies
- Joanna (singer), Brazilian singer Maria de Fátima Gomes Nogueira (born 1957)
- Joanna (typeface), a serif typeface designed by Eric Gill

== See also ==
- Johanna (disambiguation)
- Joanne (disambiguation)
