= Johanne =

Female given name

- Gender: Female

Origin
- Region of origin: French

Other names
- Related names: Johanna, Joanna, Johannes, John, Joan, Jane

Johanne is an Old French equivalent of Joanna that is now a common French Canadian female given name.

== Johanne as a given name ==
- Johanne Bégin (born 1971), Canadian waterpolo player
- Johanne Brekke, Welsh sport shooter
- Johanne Bruhn (1890–1921), Norwegian actress
- Johanne Cade, American television personality
- Johanne Deschamps (born 1959), Canadian politician
- Johanne Falardeau, Canadian badminton player
- Johanne Luise Heiberg (née Pätges) (1812–1890), Danish actress
- Johanne Paradis, Canadian language scientist, researcher
- Johanne “Bertha” Schippan (1888–1902), Australian murder victim
- Johanne Morissette Daug Amon-Lamar (born 1996), a.k.a. "Morissette", is a Filipina singer, songwriter, producer and former actress
- Johanne Sofie "Janken" Wiel-Hansen (1868–1938) Norwegian-Swedish athlete, feminist, pioneer in fencing and swordsmanship

== Other ==
- Johanne (1854), 19th-century German ship

== See also ==
- Joanne (given name)
