= Bensemann =

Bensemann is a surname. Notable people with the surname include:

- Jo Bensemann, New Zealand professor of management
- Lawrence Bensemann (1891–1969), New Zealand professional rugby league footballer who played in the 1910s
- Leo Bensemann, OBE (1912–1986), New Zealand artist, printer, typographer, publisher and editor
- Paul Bensemann, MA (1952-), New Zealand journalist, Bensemann family historian and book writer
- Walther Bensemann (1873–1934), German pioneer of football and founder of Kicker, the country's major sports publication
