= Joanne (given name) =

- Pronunciation: /dʒoʊˈæn/

Origin
- Origin: Hebrew
- Meaning: God is gracious

Other names
- Related names: Joan, Joanna, Johanna, Jo-Anne, Joann

Joanne (alternate spellings Joann, Johann, Johanne) is a female name derived from the Greek name Joanna (Koine Greek: Ἰωάννα, romanized: Iōanna) via the French Johanne.

In modern English, Joanne has sometimes been reinterpreted as a compound of the two names Jo and Anne, thus forming the name Jo-Anne, or one of its variants, which include JoAnne and Jo Anne. However, the original name Joanna in ancient Greek, Hebrew and Latin is a single unit, not a compound name. The names Hannah, Anna, Anne, Ann are etymologically related to Joanne just the same: they are derived from Hebrew חַנָּה Ḥannāh 'grace' from the same verbal root meaning "to be gracious".

In Northern Ireland of 1975, "Joanne" was the most frequently used name for female newborns, though by the early years of the 21st century, the name had declined in popularity so that it could not be counted among the twenty most frequently used.

== People with the given name Joanne ==
- Joanne Accom (born 1978), Australian singer
- Joanne Allan, New Zealand rugby union player
- Joanne Banning (born 1977), Australian field hockey player
- JoAnne S. Bass, first female senior enlisted service member of any U.S. military branch
- Joanne Beaumier (born 1996), Lebanese footballer
- Joanne Bensemann, New Zealand professor of management
- Joanne Bland (1953–2026), American civil rights activist
- Joanne Boyle (born 1963), American basketball coach
- Joanne Brackeen (born 1938), American jazz pianist
- Joanne Campbell (1964–2002), British actress
- Joanne Catherall (born 1962), British singer, member of The Human League
- Joanne Colan, British video blogger
- Joanne Elizabeth Cutler (1962–2018), British archaeologist
- Joanne Deakins (born 1972), British swimmer
- Joanne Doyle (born 1972), Irish dancer
- Joanne Dru (1922–1996), American actress
- Joanne Durant (born 1975), Barbadian sprinter
- Joanne Elliott (1925–2023), American mathematician
- Joanne Ellis (born 1981), English field hockey player
- Joanne Ernst, American triathlete
- Joanne Fluke (born 1943), American novelist
- Joanne (Jo) Frost (born 1970), English nanny, writer and TV hostess
- Joanne Grant (1930–2005), African-American journalist and Communist activist
- Joanne Harris (born 1964), British novelist
- Jo Hayes, New Zealand politician
- Joanne Head (1930–2021), American politician
- Joanne Herring (born 1929), American political activist
- Joanne C. Hillhouse (born 1970s), Antiguan writer and journalist
- Joanne Kelly (born 1978), Canadian actress
- Joanne Marrow (1945–2014), American clinical psychologist, author and professor
- Joanne McDonald (born 1952), Canadian wheelchair sport athlete
- Joanne McNally (born 1983), Irish stand-up comedian, writer and actress
- Joanne Rowling (born 1965), British author
- Joanne Pavey (born 1973), British runner
- Joanne Peh (born 1983), Singaporean actress
- Joanne Rand (1969/70–2017), English acid attack victim
- Joanne Shaw Taylor (born 1986), English blues singer and guitarist
- Joanne Shenandoah (1957–2021), American singer and guitarist
- Joanne Stoker (born 1983/84), British footwear designer
- Joanne Whalley (born 1961), British actress
- Joanne Woodward (born 1930), American actress
- Joanne Duckles (born 1975), English former journalist, communications specialist, preacher, poet and neurodivergency advocate and campaigner.

== See also ==
- Jo-Anne, given name
- Johanne, given name
- Joanna, given name
