= Queen Joanna =

Queen Joanna may refer to:

== Queens regnant ==
- Joanna I of Naples (1325–1382)
- Joanna II of Naples (1371–1435)
- Joanna of Castile (1479–1555)

== Queens consort ==
- Joanna of Bourbon (1338–1378), queen consort of France
- Joanna of Bavaria (1356–1386), queen consort of Germany and Bohemia
- Juana Enríquez (1425–1468), queen consort of Aragon
- Joanna of Rožmitál (1430–1475), queen consort of Bohemia
- Joanna of Aragon (1455–1517), queen consort of Naples
- Joanna la Beltraneja (1462–1530), queen consort of Portugal
- Joanna of Naples (1478–1518), queen consort of Naples

== See also ==
- Joanna (disambiguation)
- Queen Joan (disambiguation)
