= Jo-Ann =

Jo-Ann or Jo Ann may refer to:

- Jo-Ann (given name)
- Jo-Ann Stores, an American specialty retailer of crafts and fabrics
- "Jo-Ann", song by the American 1950s vocal group The Playmates

== See also ==
- Jo-an, teahouse in Aichi Prefecture, Japan
- Jo An (born 1982), South Korean actress
- Joanne (disambiguation)
