= Johanne Paradis =

Language scientist

- Citizenship: Canadian
- Awards: Faculty of Arts Research Excellence Award, University of Alberta (2017)

Academic background
- Education: University of British Columbia (BA, MA); McGill University (PhD)

Academic work
- Discipline: Linguist
- Sub-discipline: Language acquisition; Bilingual language development
- Institutions: University of Alberta

Johanne Catherine Paradis is a language scientist and expert on bilingual language development. She is Professor of Linguistics and adjunct professor of Communication Sciences and Disorders at the University of Alberta, where she directs the Language Acquisition Lab and the Child English Second Language (CHESL) Center.

Paradis is the Editor in Chief of the Journal of Child Language and has served on the editorial board of the Journal of Speech, Language, and Hearing Research. She co-authored (with Fred Genesee and Martha Crago) the book Dual Language Development & Disorders: A Handbook on Bilingualism & Second Language Learning. Additionally, she served as editor of the volume Input and Experience in Bilingual Development and co-editor of The Acquisition of French in Different Contexts: Focus on Functional Categories.

Paradis was awarded the 2017 Faculty of Arts Research Excellence Award by the University of Alberta in recognition of her outstanding contributions to research.

== Biography ==
Paradis studied linguistics at the University of British Columbia, where she completed her BA in 1986 and her MA in 1988. She continued her education at McGill University, where she obtained her doctorate in psychology in 1997 under the supervision of Fred Genesee. Her dissertation was titled Functional Categories and the Grammatical Development of Bilingual and Second Language Children.

After completing a post-doctoral fellowship, supported by the Social Science and Humanities Research Council of Canada, Paradis joined the Faculty of Linguistics at the University of Alberta in 2000 and was promoted to full professor in 2011. Her research program has been funded through grants from Alberta Innovates Health Solutions, the Alberta Centre for Child, Family and Community Research, the Canadian Language and Literacy Research Network, and the Social Sciences and Humanities Research Council of Canada.

== Research ==
Paradis's research program explores theoretical and applied aspects of bilingualism, second language acquisition, and heritage language acquisition in children and pre-teens. Some of her recent projects examine age effects in child second language acquisition, bilingual development in children with Autism Spectrum Disorder (ASD) from immigrant families, and language and literacy development of Syrian Refugee children.

Her work at the Child English Second Language Center focuses on acquisition of English as a second or foreign language with the aim of aiding and providing resources for clinicians and educators. Paradis and her colleagues have conducted a number of studies comparing the language profiles of children learning English as a second language, children who have Specific Language Impairment (SLI; also known as Developmental Language Disorder), and children with typical development (TD). In one of her studies, 8 to 10-year-old children who had 4 to 6 years of exposure to English as a second language were tested on their production of English tense morphology and their ability to make grammaticality judgments about English sentences. Some of the children had SLI and some had TD; the subgroups were compared to monolingual English-speaking peers with SLI or TD. The researchers found similarities among the bilingual and monolingual children with SLI with respect to their errors with English morphology, and also found similarities among the bilingual and monolingual children with TD.

== Representative publications ==
- Genesee, F., Nicoladis, E., & Paradis, J. (1995). Language differentiation in early bilingual development. Journal of Child Language, 22(3), 611–631. doi:10.1017/S0305000900009971
- Paradis, J. (2001). Do bilingual two-year-olds have separate phonological systems? International Journal of Bilingualism, 5(1), 19–38. doi:10.1177/13670069010050010201
- Paradis, J. (2010). The interface between bilingual development and specific language impairment. Applied Psycholinguistics, 31(2), 227–252. doi:10.1017/S0142716409990373
- Paradis, J. (2011). Individual differences in child English second language acquisition: Comparing child-internal and child-external factors. Linguistic Approaches to Bilingualism, 1(3), 213–237. doi:10.1075/lab.1.3.01par
- Paradis, J., & Genesee, F. (1996). Syntactic acquisition in bilingual children: Autonomous or interdependent? Studies in Second Language Acquisition, 18(1), 1-25. doi:10.1017/S0272263100014662
- Paradis, J., & Navarro, S. (2003). Subject realization and crosslinguistic interference in the bilingual acquisition of Spanish and English: What is the role of the input? Journal of Child Language, 30(2), 371–393. doi:10.1017/S0305000903005609
