= Johanna =

- Pronunciation: /dʒoʊˈ(h)ænə/; German: [joˈhana]
- Gender: female

Origin
- Origin: Hebrew > Greek > Latin
- Meaning: God is gracious

Other names
- Related names: Jan, Jane, Janet, Janice, Jean, Jo, Joan, Joanna, Joanne, Johanne, Johann, Johana

Johanna is a feminine name, a variant form of Joanna that originated in Latin in the Middle Ages, including an -h- by analogy with the Latin masculine name Johannes. The original Greek form Iōanna lacks a medial /h/ because in Greek /h/ could only occur initially. For more information on the name's origin, see the article on Joanna.

== Women named Johanna ==
- Johanna Allik (born 1994), Estonian figure skater
- Johanna Almgren (born 1984), Swedish footballer
- Johanna van Ammers-Küller (1884–1966), Dutch writer
- Johanna "Hannah" Arendt (1906–1975), German-born American political theorist
- Johanna Baehr, German climate scientist
- Johanna "Jo" Bauer-Stumpff (1873–1964), Dutch painter
- Johanna Sophia of Bavaria (c.1373–1410), Duchess consort of Austria
- Johanna Beisteiner (born 1976), Austrian classical guitarist
- Johanna Berglind (1816–1903), Swedish sign language educator
- Jóhanna Bergmann Þorvaldsdóttir, Icelandic farmer
- Johanna Bond, American law professor and academic administrator
- Johanna "Annie" Bos (1886–1975), Dutch theater and silent film actress
- Johanna van Brabant (1322–1406), Duchess of Brabant
- Johanna Braddy (born 1987), American actress
- Johanna Contreras, American public official
- Johanna Corleva (1698–1752), Dutch translator and linguist
- Johanna Eleonora De la Gardie (1661–1708), Swedish writer
- Johanna Martina Duyvené de Wit (born 1946), Dutch writer with the pseudonym Tessa de Loo
- Johanna Edwards (born 1978), American novelist
- Johanna Emanuelsson (born 1986), Swedish playwright and screenwriter
- Johanna Ernst (born 1992), Austrian rock climber
- Johanna Fateman (born 1974), American musician, writer and editor
- Johanna Fernández (historian) (born 1970), Dominican-American historian, professor, and activist
- Johanna Greie (1864–1911), German-American writer, socialist, and reformer
- Johanna Griggs (born 1973), Australian sportsperson and television personality
- Johanna van Gogh-Bonger (1862–1925), Dutch art dealer, sister-in-law of Vincent van Gogh
- Johanna Hedén (1837–1912), Swedish obstetrician
- Johanna Helena Herolt (1668–1723), German-born Dutch still-life painter
- Johanna Hiemer (born 1995), Austrian ski mountaineer
- Johanna Holmdahl (born 1982), Swedish politician
- Johanna Jachmann-Wagner (1828–1894), German mezzo-soprano
- Johanna Joseph (born 1992), French basketball player
- Johanna July (c. 1860–1942), American horse breaker
- Johanna Kirchner (1889–1944), German opponent of the Nazi régime
- Johanna Koerten (1650–1715), Dutch silhouette cutter
- Johanna Konta (born 1991), British tennis player
- Johanna "Joke" van Leeuwen (born 1952), Dutch author, illustrator, and cabaret performer
- Johanna "Anneke" Levelt Sengers (1929–2024), Dutch physicist
- Johanna Lind (born 1971), 1993 Miss Sweden
- Johanna Dorothea Lindenaer (1664–1737), Dutch writer
- Johanna Lindsey (1952–2019), American author of romance novels
- Johanna Löfblad (1733–1811), Swedish actress
- Johanna Loisinger (1865–1951), opera singer
- Johanna Long (born 1992), racing driver
- Johanna "Hanja" Maij-Weggen (born 1943), Dutch government minister
- Johanna Matz (1932–2025), Austrian actress
- Johanna Mestorf (1828–1909), German prehistoric archaeologist and museum curator
- Johanna Meeuwsen (1857–1942), South African missionary
- Johanna Nichols (born 1945), American paleolinguist
- Johanna Simone Pertens (born 2009), Estonian rhythmic gymnast
- Johanna van Polanen (1392–1445), Dutch noblewoman
- Johanna Maria Proot-Sterck (1868–1945), Dutch historian and teacher
- Johanna Ray, American casting director and producer
- Johanna Reiss (born 1932), Dutch-born American writer
- Johanna Rosaly (born 1948), Puerto Rican actress
- Johanna C.M. "Jolande" Sap (born 1963), Dutch politician
- Johanna Schaller-Klier (born 1952), retired German Olympic hurdler and Olympic gold medallist
- Johanna Schipper (born 1967), Taiwanese-born French comics cartoonist and writer known as "Johanna"
- Johanna Schopenhauer (1766–1838), German author
- Johanna "Janneke" Schopman (born 1977), Dutch field hockey player
- Johanna von Schoultz (1813–1863), Finnish opera singer
- Johanna Schouten-Elsenhout (1910–1992), Surinamese poet and community leader
- Johanna "Ans" Schut (born 1944), Dutch speed skater
- Johanna Sebauer (born 1988), Austrian writer
- Johanna "Jopie" Selbach (1918–1998), Dutch swimmer
- Johanna Spyri (1827–1901), Swiss author of Heidi
- Johanna Sundberg (1828–1910), Swedish ballerina
- Johanna ter Steege (born 1961), Dutch actress
- Johanna Talihärm (born 1993), Estonian biathlete
- Johanna "Hannie" Termeulen (1929–2001), Dutch swimmer
- Johanna Veenstra (1894–1933), American missionary
- Johanna Vergouwen (1630–1714), Flemish Baroque painter and copyist
- Johanna Petronella Vrugt (1905–1960), Dutch writer and poet with the pseudonym Anna Blaman
- Johanna Waterous (born 1957), Canadian businesswoman
- Johanna Wattier (1762–1827), Dutch actress
- Johanna Westerdijk (1883–1961), Dutch plant pathologist, first female professor in the Netherlands

Jóhanna

- Jóhanna Sigurðardóttir (born 1942), Iceland's first female prime minister and the world's first openly gay head of government of the modern era
- Jóhanna Guðrún Jónsdóttir, a.k.a. Yohanna, Icelandic singer

== Masculine name ==
- Johanna Omolo (born 1989), Kenyan footballer

== Fictional characters ==
- Johanna, a character in many adaptations of the story of Sweeney Todd, named "Johanna Oakley" in the original version of the tale and "Johanna Barker" in Sondheim's musical adaptation
- A role in August Bournonville's comic ballet The Kermesse in Bruges
- Johanna Mason, a character in the popular Hunger Games series, being mentioned without a name in the first novel and appearing as a main character in Catching Fire and Mockingjay.
- Johanna Reyes, a character in the Divergent series beginning with Insurgent. She is the leader of the Amity faction.
- Johanna, a playable character in the video game Heroes of the Storm.
- Johanna, the motorcycle-shaped persona of Makoto Niijima in Persona 5.
- Johanna, the titular character's mother in Hilda.

== Name day ==
- Latvia: 15 December
- Hungary: 28 March
- Finland: 21 July
- Greece: 7 January
- Poland: 31 May
- Sweden: 21 July
- Estonia: 15 August

== See also ==
- Jane (given name)
- Joan (given name)
- Joanna
- Johannes
- Joke (given name)
