= Joanne =

Joanne may refer to:

== Music ==
- Joanne (album), 2016 album by Lady Gaga
  - "Joanne" (Lady Gaga song), a 2016 song from the album Joanne
- "Joanne" (Michael Nesmith song), a 1970 song from the album Magnetic South
- "Joanne", a song by Cherry Ghost from the 2014 album Herd Runners

== Other uses ==
- Joanne (given name)
- Joanne (Coronation Street), a character from the British television soap opera Coronation Street
- JoAnne's Bed and Back, defunct U.S. furniture retailer

== See also ==
- Jo-Ann (disambiguation)
- Joanna (disambiguation)
- Joannes (died 425), western Roman emperor
- Johanne (disambiguation)
- Jehanne (disambiguation)
- Jeanne (disambiguation)
- Joan (disambiguation)
