= Joke (given name) =

Dutch feminine given name

- Pronunciation: Dutch: [ˈjoːkə]
- Language: Dutch

Origin
- Derivation: Jo + ke

Other names
- Derived: Jo, Johanna

Joke (Dutch pronunciation: [ˈjoːkə]) is a Dutch feminine given name. It is a diminutive of the name Jo and a short form of the name Johanna.

== People named Joke ==
People with the first name Joke include:

- Joke van Beusekom (born 1952), Dutch badminton player
- Joke Bijleveld (born 1940), Dutch track and field athlete
- Joke Bouwstra (born 1956), Dutch skin researcher
- Joke Brandt (born 1958), Dutch diplomat
- Joke Bruijs (born 1952), Dutch actress and singer
- Joke Devynck (born 1972), Belgian actress
- Joke Dierdorp (born 1955), Dutch rower
- Joke Fincioen, American filmmaker and TV producer
- Joke Folmer (1923–2022), Dutch resistance member in WWII
- Joke Kersten (1944–2020), Dutch politician
- Joke Kleijweg (born 1962), Dutch long-distance runner
- Joke de Korte (born 1935), Dutch swimmer
- Joke Kos (born 1956), Dutch gymnast
- Joke de Kruijf (born 1965), Dutch musical actress
- Joke van der Leeuw-Roord (born 1949), Dutch historian
- Joke van Leeuwen (born 1952), Dutch author, illustrator, and cabaret performer
- Joke Muyiwa (born 1963), Nigerian film actress
- Joke van Rijswijk (born 1954), Dutch athlete
- Joke Schauvliege (born 1970), Flemish politician
- Joke Silva (born 1961), Nigerian actress, director, and businesswoman
- Joke Smit (1933–1981), Dutch feminist and politician
- Joke Swiebel (born 1941), Dutch politician and activist
- Joke Waller-Hunter (1946–2005), Dutch UN official

== See also ==
- Joke Jay, German electronic DJ and artist
- Joke Singh, Indian comedian and actor
