= Jo-Anne =

Jo-Anne, Jo Anne, Jo-Ann, JoAnn, JoAnne, and Jo Ann is a feminine given name derived from the name Joanne. Unlike the name Joanne, which originates from the Greek Joanna, Jo-Anne is a compound name consisting of the names Jo and Anne.

Notable persons with that name include:

- Jo Ann Algermissen (1942–2009), American novelist
- JoAnne S. Bass, first female senior enlisted service member of any U.S. military branch
- Jo-Anne Baird, English educational theorist
- Jo Anne B. Barnhart (born 1950), American social security official
- Jo-Anne Beaumier, Lebanese footballer
- Jo Ann Campbell (born 1938), American singer
- Jo-Anne L. Coe (1933–2002), American politician
- Jo Ann Davis (1950–2007), American politician
- Jo-Anne Dobson (born 1966), Northern-Irish politician
- Jo Ann Emerson (born 1950), American politician
- JoAnn Falletta (born 1954), American conductor
- Jo Ann M. Gora, American academic
- Jo Ann Kelly (1944–1990), English singer and guitarist
- Jo-Anne Knowles, English actress
- Jo Anne Lyon (born 1940), American church leader
- Jo-Anne Nadler, British journalist and author
- Jo-Anne McArthur (born 1976), Canadian photojournalist, animal rights activist and author
- JoAnn Persch (1934–2025), American religious sister and immigration activist
- Jo Ann Pflug (born 1940), American actress
- Jo-Anne Richards, South African journalist and author
- Jo Ann Sayers (1918–2011), American actress
- Jo Ann Sprague (born 1931), American politician
- Jo Anne Van Tilburg, American archaeologist
- Jo Anne Worley (born 1937), American actress
- Jo Ann Zimmerman (born 1936), American politician

== See also ==
- Joanne (given name)
- Jo-Anna, given name
- Jo-Annes de Bat (born 1980), Dutch politician
