= Queen Joan =

Queen Joan may refer to:

== Queens regnant ==
- Joan I of Navarre (1273–1305)
- Joan II of Navarre (1312–1349)

== Queens consort ==
- Joan of England (1165–1199), queen consort of Sicily
- Joan of England (1210–1238), queen consort of Scotland
- Joan, Countess of Ponthieu (1220–1279), queen consort of Castile and Leon
- Joan of Taranto, queen consort of Armenia
- Joan II, Countess of Burgundy (1287–1330), queen consort of France and Navarre
- Joan the Lame of Burgundy (1293–1349), queen consort of France
- Joan of Évreux (1310–1371), queen consort of France and Navarre
- Joan of the Tower (1321–1362), queen consort of Scotland
- Joan of Valois (1343–1373), queen consort of Navarre
- Joan of Navarre (1368–1437), queen consort of England
- Joan Beaufort (1404–1445), queen consort of Scotland
- Joan of Portugal (1439–1475), queen consort of Castile and León
- Joan of France, Duchess of Berry (1464–1505), queen consort of France

== See also ==
- Joan (disambiguation)
- Queen Joanna (disambiguation)
