= Joana =

- Gender: Female

Other names
- Related names: Joan, Xoana

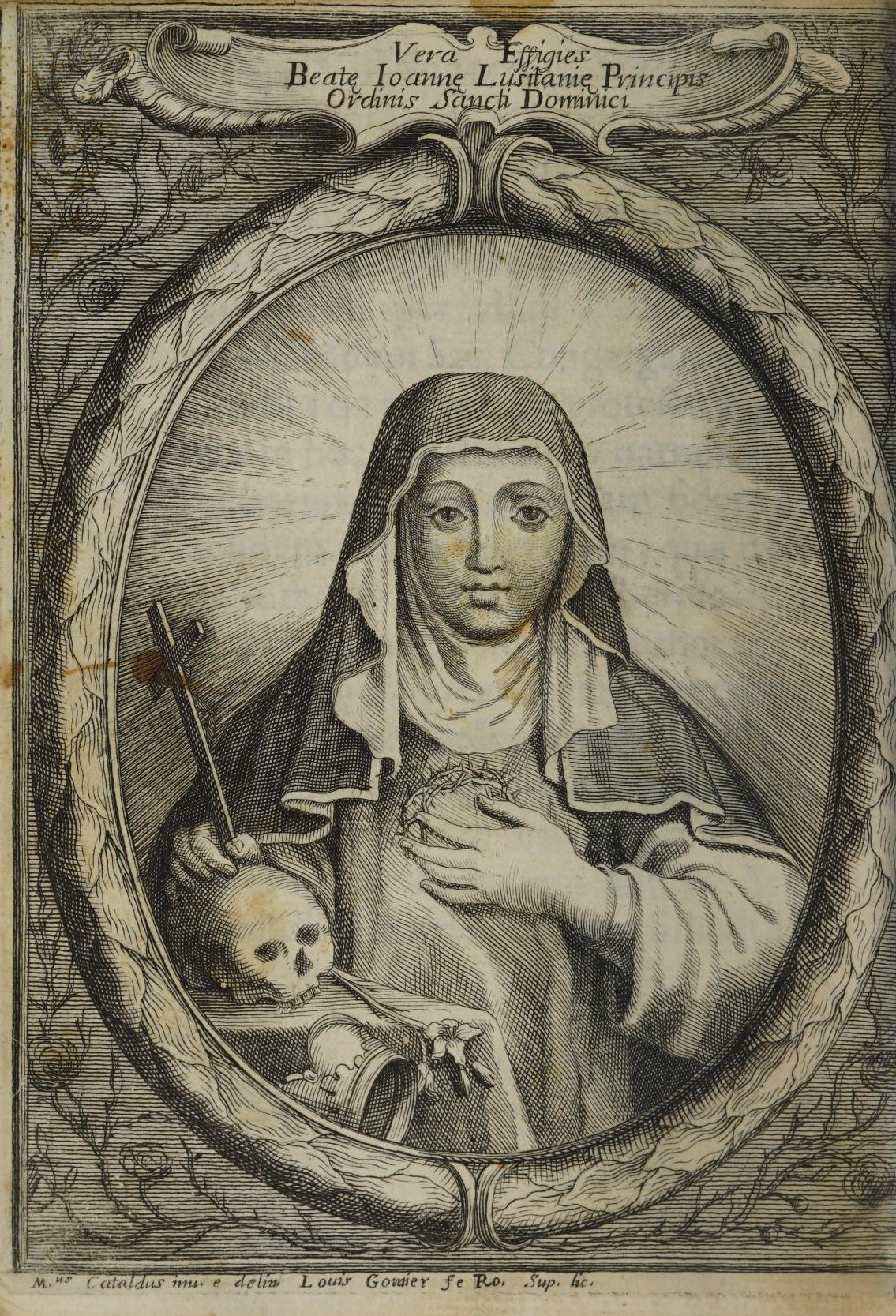
Engraving of Joana of Portugal

Joana is a given name, equivalent to Joanna in Catalan (IPA: [ʒuˈanə]) and Portuguese (IPA: [ʒuˈɐnɐ]). The Galician form of the name is Xoana (IPA: [ʃoˈanɐ]). It may refer to:

- Joana Angélica (1761–1822), Brazilian Conceptionist nun, belonging to the Reformed Order of Our Lady of Conception, and martyr of the Brazilian Independence
- Joana Benedek (born 1972), Romanian-born Mexican actress
- Joana, Princess of Beira, a.k.a. Joana of Portugal (1635–1653), a Portuguese princess, daughter of John IV
- Joana Civita, accused witch, Catalonia (trial 1615-1619)
- Joana Ceddia (born 2001), Brazilian-Canadian YouTuber
- Joana de Eça (1480–1572), Portuguese courtier and royal favorite
- Joana Glaza, the Lithuanian lead singer of rock group Joana and the Wolf
- Joana Kuntz, professor of psychology in New Zealand
- Joana Montouto (born 1990), Spanish footballer
- Joana da Paz (1925–2023), Brazilian activist
- Joana Prado (born 1976), Brazilian-American businesswoman and former model
- Joana Zimmer (born 1982), German pop music singer

== See also ==
- Joanna
