= Joanna (prioress of Lothen) =

Joanna (prioress of Lothen), a twelfth century nun, was the prioress of the monastery of Lothen in Germany.

Joanna is remembered for her tapestry work. Around the year 1200, Joanna, along with two of her nuns named Alheidis and Reglindis, wove a series of tapestries. The tapestries were well regarded, and have been described as brilliant. The scenes depicted in the tapestry tell the story of the monastery's tumultuous history.
