= Johanna Edwards =

Bestselling American novelist

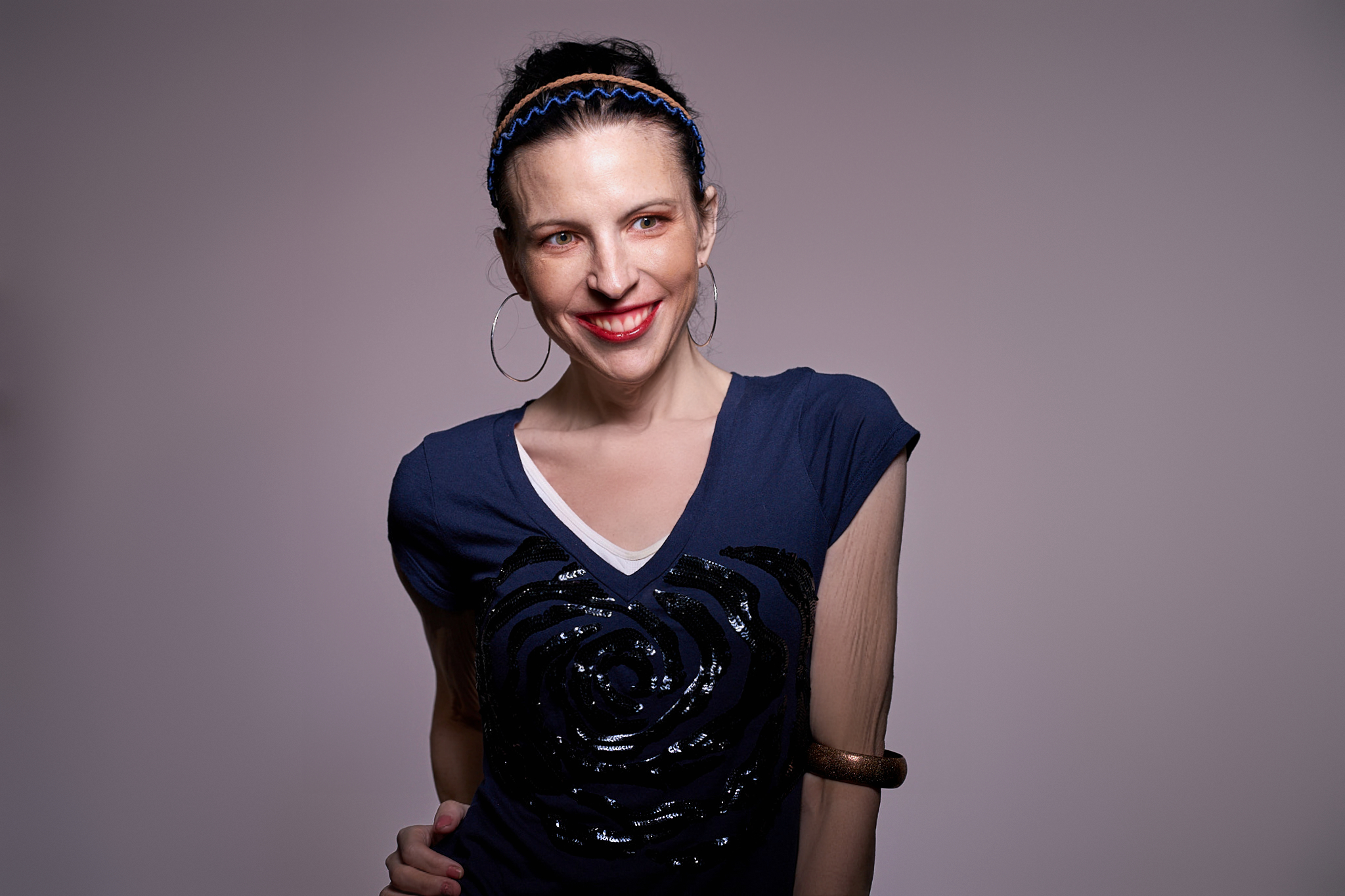
- Born: February 27, 1978 (age 48); Memphis, Tennessee, U.S.
- Education: University of Memphis
- Occupation: Novelist
- Writing career
- Period: 2005–present
- Genre: Women's fiction
- Notable works: The Next Big Thing; Your Big Break

Johanna Edwards (born February 27, 1978) is an American novelist and journalist. Her books have been translated into various languages. She achieved International Bestselling author status when her first 2 books made the bestseller list in Brazil and her second book became a major hit in The Netherlands.

== Biography ==
Born in Memphis, Tennessee, Edwards graduated from the University of Memphis with a degree in journalism in 2001.

Edwards is best known for her debut novel, The Next Big Thing, which was published in 2005 and remained on the national bestseller list for nearly four months. Her follow-up novel, Your Big Break, was also a bestseller. Her third novel, How to Be Cool, was also published by Penguin in June 2008. Edwards has also written two young adult novels under the pen name Jo Edwards, the first of which, Love Undercover, was published by Simon & Schuster in late 2006, and her second, Go Figure, was released October 2007.

Edwards has been featured in USA Today, Us Weekly, The Boston Globe, and Writer's Digest. She currently resides in Memphis.

== Awards and honors ==
In 2001, she received a Hearst Award for her work in journalism. In 2008, she was given the Distinguished Young Alumni Award from the University of Memphis; and in 2012, the Center for Research on Women at the University of Memphis honored her as one of 100 Women who have made a difference in the past 100 years.

== Bibliography ==
- How to Be Cool (2007)
- Your Big Break (2006)
- The Next Big Thing (2005)

Young adult books written under the pen name Jo Edwards:

- Go Figure (2007)
- Love Undercover (2006)
