= Joke Kersten =

Dutch politician (1944–2020)

Johanna Wilhelmina (Joke) Kersten (11 April 1944 – 6 August 2020) was a Dutch politician. She served as member of the House of Representatives for the Labour Party from 4 September 1990 to 17 May 1994. She was mayor of Grubbenvorst and Broekhoven between 1995 and 2001. Later Kersten was acting mayor of Arcen en Velden, Bergeijk and Asten. She served as mayor of Uden between 2004 and 2009.
