= Ioanna Babassika =

Greek human rights lawyer

Ioanna Babassika is a Greek human rights lawyer. Since 2000, she is a member of the Committee for the Prevention of Torture, elected in respect of Greece. She is, since 1989, legal counsellor of the Medical Rehabilitation Centre for Torture Victims, an NGO based in Athens affiliated with the International Rehabilitation Council for Torture Victims. She was chairperson of the EU Association of Amnesty International 1990-1995. She worked for the United Nations High Commissioner for Refugees 1988-1990. She was also President of the European Studies Association 1981-1984.

She studied law at the Law School of Athens 1967-1972, attended the International School of Comparative Law in Amsterdam in 1973 and the College of Europe in Belgium 1973-1974 (Giuseppe Mazzini promotion).
