= Joanna Werners =

Dutch writer

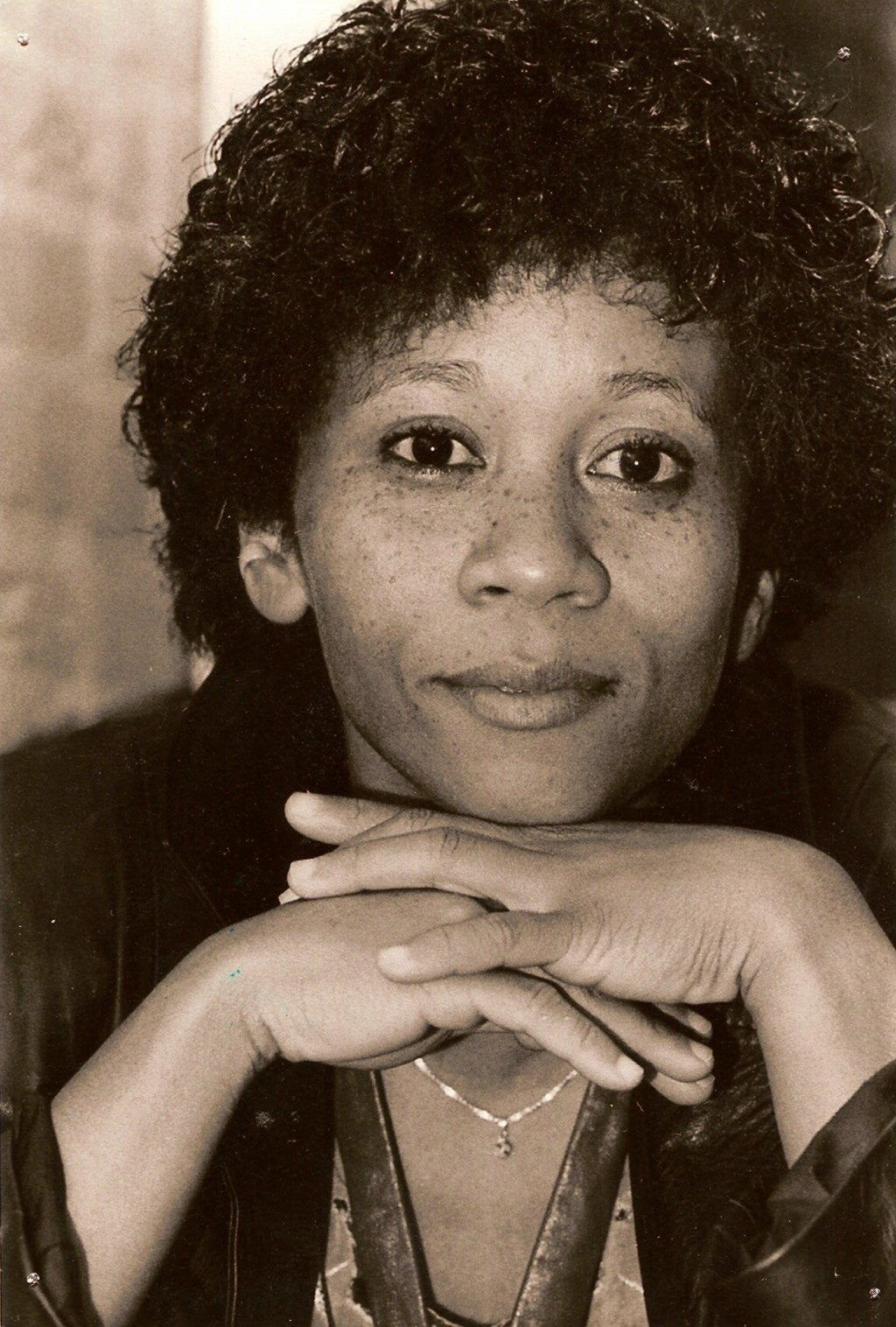
- Joanna Werners in 1987.
- Born: 25 December 1953 (age 72); Paramaribo, Suriname
- Occupations: Author and poet

Joanna Werners (born 25 December 1953) is a Dutch writer of Surinamese origin. She is considered a pioneer of Surinamese lesbian literature.

== Biography ==
Werners was born on 25 December 1953 in Paramaribo, Suriname. She attended the city's Algemene Middelbare School. At age 18, she moved to the Netherlands, where she worked as a physical education and economics teacher.

Her debut book was the autobiographical novel Droomhuid, released in 1987. The book tells the story of a woman who is torn between her love for a black woman and a white woman. The novel is considered the first work of lesbian-feminist literature in the history of Suriname.

Droomhuid was followed by the novels Vriendinnenvrouwen (1994), Amba, vrouw van het Surinaamse erf (1996), Zuigend moeras (1990), and Schaamteloze warmte (2002), all of which deal with black women, their social and psychological emancipation, and lesbianism. Her work has also dealt with such issues as unwanted pregnancy and old age. In 2007, Werners released her poetry collection Sluimerende schaduwen as part of the poetry series De Windroos.

== Selected works ==
- Droomhuid (1987)
- Zuigend moeras (1990)
- Vriendinnenvrouwen (1994)
- Amba, vrouw van het Surinaamse erf (1996)
- Amba, je was toch allemaal vrouw (1996)
- Schaamteloze warmte (2002)
- Sluimerende Schaduwen (2007)
