= Joanna Isabel Mayer =

American mathematician (1904–1991)

Joanna Isabel Mayer (March 6, 1904 – February 28, 1991) was an American mathematician and educator. She was Marquette University's first doctoral student in mathematics and one of the few American women to earn a PhD in mathematics before World War II.

== Biography ==
Mayer was born in Pettis County, Missouri, the third of five children of a parochial school teacher, Anna Poinsignon, and a farmer, Edward John Mayer. The first school she attended was Sacred Heart School in Sedalia, Missouri but then the family moved many times including to Los Angeles, California, Phoenix, Arizona, Portland, Oregon, Kansas City, Missouri, Nashville, Tennessee, Salt Lake City, Utah, and back to San Jose, California where she graduated from Notre Dame High School. Throughout her life, she attended and taught only in Catholic schools.

Mayer received her B.A. degree from Dominican College in San Rafael in 1927 with a major in mathematics and a minor in philosophy. While there she was influenced by mathematician Anna Marie Whelan. Mayer immediately enrolled in graduate school at Marquette University in Milwaukee, Wisconsin, and in 1928 she received her MA degree with the thesis titled: A geometric interpretation and classification of the invariants of the binary and ternary conics and cubics, directed by Harvey Pierson Pettit. In 1931, she was the person to earn a doctorate in mathematics at Marquette University, studying again under Pettit's direction with a thesis entitled: Projective Description of Plane Quartic Curves.

=== Educator ===
From 1929 to 1930, while she was finishing her doctoral studies, she served as department head at Marymount College in Salina, Kansas. In 1930 the Mathematical Association of America announced her membership.

In 1932 she taught in San Jose, California, and from 1937 to 1938 she was an instructor at Seton Hill College (now Seton Hill University), which was a Catholic women's college at the time, located in Greensburg, Pennsylvania. In 1939 she taught at Xavier University in New Orleans, described as "the only Catholic institution among the historically black colleges and universities" at that time. According to Green, "Mayer wrote in a letter to the Marquette graduate school dean in 1956 that she left teaching in 1942 and had supported herself since by buying and selling stocks."

During World War II, she worked in Washington, D.C., and in 1950 for the Guided Missiles Committee of the Department of Defense, Pentagon, Washington, D.C. She worked for more than 13 years at the Military Personnel Records Center in St. Louis, Missouri.

=== Personal life ===
Mayer died February 28, 1991, in San Jose, California and was buried at the Santa Clara Mission Cemetery.

== Memberships ==
According to Judy Green, Mayer belonged to two professional societies.

- Mathematical Association of America
- American Mathematical Society
