= Johanna Baehr =

German climate scientist

Johanna Baehr is a German climate scientist. She is the Deputy Head of Max Planck Institute for Meteorology.

She hosted the ZDF program "Princess of Science".

She teaches at University of Hamburg. She won a Bavarian Prize for Excellence in Teaching. She is a member of the Earth and Society Research Hub.

== Works ==
- "Evaluation of Climate Models". Climate Change 2013 – The Physical Science Basis (PDF). Cambridge University Press. 2014-03-24. doi:10.1017/cbo9781107415324.020. ISBN 978-1-107-05799-9.
- Müller, W. A.; Jungclaus, J. H.; Mauritsen, T.; Baehr, J.; Bittner, M.; Budich, R.; Bunzel, F.; Esch, M.; Ghosh, R.; Haak, H.; Ilyina, T.; Kleine, T.; Kornblueh, L.; Li, H.; Modali, K.; Notz, D.; Pohlmann, H.; Roeckner, E.; Stemmler, I.; Tian, F.; Marotzke, J. (2018). "A Higher‐resolution Version of the Max Planck Institute Earth System Model (MPI‐ESM1.2‐HR)". Journal of Advances in Modeling Earth Systems. 10 (7): 1383–1413. doi:10.1029/2017MS001217. hdl:21.11116/0000-0002-020F-C. ISSN 1942-2466.
- Frajka-Williams, Eleanor; Ansorge, Isabelle J.; Baehr, Johanna; Bryden, Harry L.; Chidichimo, Maria Paz; Cunningham, Stuart A.; Danabasoglu, Gokhan; Dong, Shenfu; Donohue, Kathleen A.; Elipot, Shane; Heimbach, Patrick; Holliday, N. Penny; Hummels, Rebecca; Jackson, Laura C.; Karstensen, Johannes; Lankhorst, Matthias; Le Bras, Isabela A.; Lozier, M. Susan; McDonagh, Elaine L.; Meinen, Christopher S.; Mercier, Herlé; Moat, Bengamin I.; Perez, Renellys C.; Piecuch, Christopher G.; Rhein, Monika; Srokosz, Meric A.; Trenberth, Kevin E.; Bacon, Sheldon; Forget, Gael; Goni, Gustavo; Kieke, Dagmar; Koelling, Jannes; Lamont, Tarron; McCarthy, Gerard D.; Mertens, Christian; Send, Uwe; Smeed, David A.; Speich, Sabrina; van den Berg, Marcel; Volkov, Denis; Wilson, Chris (2019-06-07). "Atlantic Meridional Overturning Circulation: Observed Transport and Variability". Frontiers in Marine Science. 6. doi:10.3389/fmars.2019.00260. hdl:1912/24468. ISSN 2296-7745.
