= Lawrence Bensemann =

New Zealand international rugby league footballer

Personal information
- Full name: Lawrence Otto Bensemann
- Born: 4 March 1891; Motueka, New Zealand
- Died: 23 September 1969 (aged 78); Wellington, New Zealand

Playing information
- Position: Forward
Club
Years	Team	Pld	T	G	FG	P
1913–14	Newtown	13	4	0	0	12
Representative
Years	Team	Pld	T	G	FG	P
1913	Wellington	3	3	0	0	9
1913–14	Wellington Trial	2	0	0	0	0
1913	New Zealand	1	0	0	0	0
- Source: Papers Past

Lawrence Otto Bensemann (4 March 1891 – 23 September 1969) was a New Zealand professional rugby league footballer who played in the 1910s. He played at representative level for New Zealand, and Wellington, as a forward.

== Early life and family ==
Born in Motueka in 1891, Bensemann was educated at Nelson College from 1904 to 1906. He was the uncle of artist Leo Bensemann.

== Playing career ==
=== International honours ===
Bensemann represented New Zealand in 1913 against New South Wales.

== World War 1 and 2 ==
Lawrence Bensemann served in both world wars. He enlisted in 1915 and at the time was married to Charlotte Bensemann and stated his address as Sutherland Road in Maranui. Following the war he worked as an accountant and was living on Konini Rd in Hataitai. In October 1924 he found a body on Mount Victoria.
