= Ioanna Morfessis =

American businesswoman

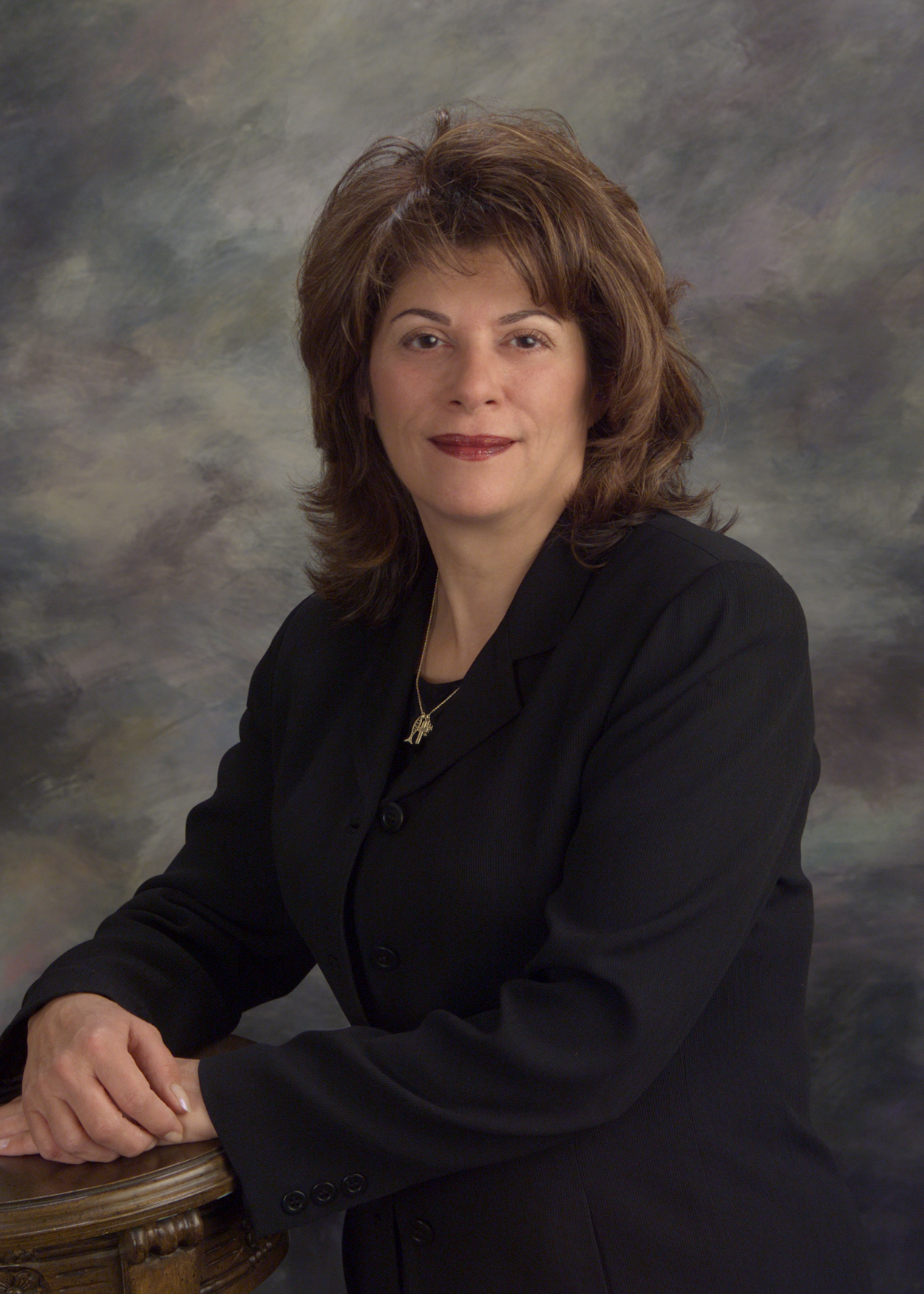
- Born: Washington D.C., U.S.
- Education: ASU
- Occupation: Economic Developer
- Website: www.ioannaworldwide.com

Ioanna Morfessis (pronounced: /ˌioʊˈɑːnə mɔːrˈfɛsɪs/) is an American businesswoman and economic development professional. Morfessis later established Montgomery County, Maryland’s first Office of Economic Development, opening the office with a budget of $100,000, and growing it to $1.7 million by the time she was recruited to Phoenix just five years later. In 1985 Morfessis was recruited to Phoenix to initiate the city’s first private public partnership, Phoenix Economic Growth Corporation (PEGC). Five years later, Phoenix and the surrounding metro communities invited Morfessis to found a regional public-private economic development partnership, Greater Phoenix Economic Council (GPEC), which became a model for successful collaborative economic development partnerships worldwide. In 1997, Morfessis was recruited to implement the GPEC model for the Greater Baltimore Alliance (GBA) as president and CEO, where she forged a cohesive regional economic development initiative for the greater metropolitan area. In these posts, she led efforts to recruit and expand more than 300 firms that combined, invested over $27 billion in private capital and generated more than 250,000 direct new jobs. In 2004, Dr. Morfessis returned to Arizona, where she currently serves as founder and President at IO.INC, assisting organizations and communities to develop and execute sustainable growth strategies. Morfessis also served as president of Council for Urban Economic Development (CUED) from 1992 to 1994, increasing the organization’s focus on national policy, providing input on urban federal economic development initiatives like Community Development Block Grant program (CDBG) and others. In 2011, Morfessis was awarded the International Economic Development Council (IEDC) Ed DeLuca Lifetime Achievement Award for Excellence in Economic Development for “an esteemed career of empowering communities and companies to prosper” and for founding three best-of-class economic development organizations in the U.S.”

A first generation Greek American, Morfessis was born in Washington, D.C., and grew up in Bethesda, Maryland. She holds a Bachelor of Arts degree in Political Science, summa cum laude, from the American University, a Masters of Public Administration from George Washington University, and a Doctor of Philosophy from Arizona State University, writing her dissertation on collaboration in economic development.

== Professional highlights ==
While serving as Director of Resource Development at the Greater Washington Business Center(GWBC) in Washington, D.C., Morfessis developed programs to aid minority businesses, including the formation of the Metropolitan Washington Minority Purchasing Council, which established and achieved company goals for minority participation in government contracts. She helped to stage the Opportunity Fair of 1976 – one of the first nationwide minority procurement trade fairs in the U.S. Accomplishments included: co-founding the nation’s first one-stop business assistance center for minority businesses; attaining more than $1 million in financial and in-kind contributions from the private sector to support and assist minority business development; advised more than 100 minority entrepreneurs on business start-ups and helped procure $678,000 in small business loans, the equivalent of $3,517,628 in 2024 dollars; and assisted major national corporations, including IBM, Martin Marietta and Marriott, with the development of their small and minority business procurement programs.

As acting director for the Montgomery, Maryland Office of Economic Development and Agriculture Development, Morfessis recommended separating economic development and agricultural functions, and lobbied the county executive Charles W. Gilchrist for the change. In 1980, Gilchrist created a cabinet level department dedicated to economic development, and appointed Morfessis to develop her vision. As director of Montgomery, Maryland Office of Economic Development (MCOED), Morfessis created the county’s first five-year strategic plan to diversified its economy, positioning the county to be a center for corporate headquarters, science and technology. Recognizing the area’s proximity to federal science agencies, Morfessis implemented a strategy to improve the County’s competitive profile by drawing bioscience companies to the area. During her tenure, MCOED landed major firms and federal research labs and worked to expand funding for the federal labs already in Montgomery County. The organization’s largest project, Montgomery invested in the Shady Grove Life Sciences Center, a publicly owned 232-acre research and industrial park, which drew its first corporate biotech tenant, Microbiological Associates, in 1983. Morfessis also facilitated commitments from Otsuka Pharmaceutical Company, and two new higher education campuses to offer graduate and post graduate programs, the University of Maryland (opened 1983), and Johns Hopkins University (opened 1988). She also spearheaded a partnership between Montgomery County, the National Institute of Health (NIH) and the University of Maryland to create the Center for Advanced Research in Biotechnology (CARB), which later became the University of Maryland Biotechnology Institute. Morfessis’ work with corporations, including General Motors regional headquarters, Otsuka Pharmaceutical, NASD,IBM, Data General, Litton Bionetics, Fairchild Industries, Crown Data, to development of office, research and development and high-tech projects had a combined total value of $3.5 billion, and contributed to Montgomery County’s 43 percent job growth. Between 1980 and 1985 the region produced 70,000 new jobs, and another 85,000 jobs by 1990. While at MCOED, Morfessis advocated for infrastructure improvement to increase state and local investment into transportation improvements, as well as the county’s first joint venture in central business redevelopment, leading to a $75 million mixed use project in downtown Bethesda, MD. Morfessis organized the Economic Advisory Council, a private organization of CEOs to advise the County Executive on economic, fiscal and management issues. Council members donated more than 35,000 hours in support of numerous projects during Morfessis’ tenure.

In 1985, Morfessis was recruited to Arizona to build the first public-private partnership for the city of Phoenix, Phoenix Economic Growth Corporation (PEGC), where she was directly involved in the attraction of 42 companies to Phoenix, generating more than $2 billion in private investment and 8,000 new jobs. While at PEGC, the organization was tasked with branding and marketing the expansion of the City’s airport property just west of Phoenix Sky Harbor International Airport into an industrial and office complex, Sky Harbor Center, creating a major employment center in the region. Morfessis was influential in the City’s decision to streamline nine development departments into a single city department, the Development Services Department. In 1989, responding to funding cuts and other economic impacts resulting from the Savings & Loan crisis, local and regional leaders in the Phoenix metro area merged their formerly competitive economic development efforts under one umbrella, forming the Greater Phoenix Economic Council (GPEC). GPEC’s board installed Morfessis as its first president and CEO. A private-public partnership, GPEC brought together the region's leading CEOs, 15 local and county governments, three principal educational institutions, and organized labor. Unused to collaborating with other jurisdictions historically seen as competitors, it took the new partnership nine months to build trust and a common vision for the Greater Phoenix area Chase Bank’s new Western U.S. operations center locating in Tempe was GPEC’s first big win. The organization went on to be listed repeatedly in the Forbes and Fortune Top 10 Cities for Business. GPEC’s regional collaboration model became a model organization for the rest of the country. Morfessis facilitated Arizona’s first statewide economic development strategy (Arizona’s Strategic Plan for Economic Development), and Arizona became the first state to utilize Dr. Michael Porter’s cluster-based theory of economic development as the cornerstone of its strategic plan. GPEC pursued a critical goal of diversification of the region’s economic base, improved the competitiveness of the business climate and marketed the region nationally and internationally. The strategy reduced the state's dependence on housing construction and population growth, and encouraged cluster-based industry work groups. Under Morfessis’ leadership, private sector jobs grew by 23.5 percent in the Phoenix metropolitan area, between 1993 to 1996, among the highest job growth rates for a metro area of its size in the United States. During Morfessis' tenure, GPEC-assisted locates, including Avnet World Headquarters, Sumitomo, Oracle Corporation, The Vanguard Group, Charles Schwab & Company, Fender Musical Instruments National Headquarters, Kraft Foods Corporation, Conair, Ryobi, Snapple Beverage Corporation, Starwood Lodging Corporation, China Mist Brands, Toyota Motor Corporation, Mutual of Omaha, Discover Card, Microchip Technology, Hamilton Standard Aerospace, and AT&T, established more than 164,000 new direct and induced jobs in the Greater Phoenix area, representing $2.7 billion in total employee earnings, and invested more than $20 billion in new plants, buildings, and equipment.

In 1997, Morfessis returned to Maryland to serve as the inaugural president for the Greater Baltimore region’s newly-formed private public partnership for economic development, the Greater Baltimore Alliance (GBA). GBA’s board brought together the leading corporate CEOs and business entrepreneurs, educational officers, the Governor of Maryland, the Mayor of Baltimore, and County Executives from the five counties which surround the city. Economic development officers from those same jurisdictions populated an advisory board, the Economic Alliance Advisory Committee, along with business development staff from the major utility companies. By bringing the jurisdictions together at both policy-making and execution around an aligned regional vision, Morfessis was able to transform a once-competitive and divided economic development effort into a unified regional endeavor. GBA stakeholders were able to forge a comprehensive strategy to attain and sustain economic competitiveness. Goals for GBA included building new programs to attract and retain businesses, and to provide a single point of contact and seamless customer service to newly locating and expanding employers. As a first building block, GBA needed an antidote to “a residual image of the state of Maryland that is very negative” to business. Though local corporate leaders experienced the region as a growing synergy of science, technology and business, Maryland’s business-friendly policies were not well-known outside the state. Morfessis raised funds to pay for the “Why Baltimore?” campaign and engaged local business leaders to promote the region’s assets peer-to-peer. She helped establish Space Hope, a partnership between the Alliance, NASA, and several of the area’s colleges and universities. The program encourages students to pursue studies in science and math, and was established long before STEM (science, technology, engineering and math) became a focal point of educational policy. Morfessis also assisted with the formation of the Greater Baltimore Cultural Alliance, the region’s first organization to coordinate the efforts of the disparate performing and visual arts groups and museums. GBA-assisted firms created more than $10 billion in new economic activity in Greater Baltimore’s economy between 1997 and 2003. During her tenure, Morfessis was responsible for the relocation, expansion, or retention of 34 companies and $5.2 billion of new economic activity. The economic impact of these companies was projected in 2003 to create $14.5 billion in new demand and 11,000 new jobs over ten years. Projects included Bank One, Toyota Financial Corporation, Amerock (Newell Rubbermaid), American Healthways, Sierra Military Health Systems, World Relief International headquarters, Coca Cola Enterprises, World Duty Free International headquarters and Chubb Insurance.

In 2004, Morfessis returned to Arizona and founded IO.INC, where she serves president and chief strategist, and serves with a broad client base including cities and regions; global and domestic companies, publicly traded and privately held; master planned community developers, and nonprofit organizations. For a decade, IO.INC assisted a “start-up city” — the City of Maricopa, Arizona — serving as the architect of its economic development strategy, programs, and tool kit. Maricopa has grown from a population of 4,300 in 2003 to an estimated 74,000 in 2024. In 2004, Morfessis became a founding board member of the Helios Education Foundation, a nonprofit organization supporting postsecondary attainment for all students, especially low-income and underrepresented communities, in Arizona and Florida. Helios has invested more than $350 million in partnerships and initiatives focused on improving student education outcomes. Morfessis continues to serve on the Helios board.

== Economic development methods ==
Morfessis’ is widely recognized by her peers for moving the economic development tool box beyond traditional modes of attraction and retention. She pioneered a data-driven systems approach that starts with an assessment of a region’s most competitive assets. The method, called cluster analysis, is designed to identify a region’s industry clusters – groups of interconnected businesses that together form an economic unit. By working together, industry leaders, government officials and economic development strategists can craft long-term growth plans for selected clusters, specifically those with the potential to create sustainable, high quality jobs that pay good wages and offer employees opportunities for growth. Strengthening budding but under-developed clusters can also help diversify a regional economy, mitigating against volatile economic dynamics. Morfessis’ approach includes the following steps:

- Provide decision makers who influence economic development with knowledge of competitiveness issues and their relationship to economic development;
- Create partnerships between government, business, and academia through which these issues can be effectively addressed; and
- Develop specific plans and programs through these partnerships to strengthen competitiveness for both the community and the company.

Morfessis also refined collaborative methods for economic development, based on her own research into the characteristics of sustainable collaborations. As societies become more complex and power more diffused across sectors, a broadly inclusive power base of individuals, groups, and institutions becomes a necessary for effectuating constructive change. Morfessis identified seven preconditions to successful economic development collaborations: (1) A civic culture, in which communal norms encourage participation of its citizenry; (2) A civic infrastructure in which formal and informal community networks have evolved and which facilitate inclusion and cooperation; (3) A public city, in which government assumes a proactive role in the economic development process; (4) a shared interest (crisis or problem) around which groups and institutions are willing to galvanize and act; (5) key private and public leadership that visibly champion the collaborations over the long term; (6) the “nerves,” or communications and feedback processes necessary to facilitate understanding, reduce conflict and smooth the way for collaboration; and (7) a highly diffracted institutional landscape, especially in economic development, to accommodate collaboration. The success of these models have played out across her own field work. Today her work also typically includes a “HALO” (history, asset, liability and opportunity) analysis for clients, which involves listening and learning from all project stakeholders. Through a collaborative process, IO.INC facilitates the development of a strategic plan to maximize client assets, optimize growth opportunities, create detailed blueprints for implementation and assists clients with follow-through.

In terms of practical attraction tools, Morfessis’ methods take the following forms:

- Emphasis on genuine, authentic collaboration among private, public, education sectors to find common values and grow a culture of working together;
- Collaborators need to be committed to each other’s success just as they are committed to their own;
- Strengthening the institutions, organizations, and other assets, while simultaneously supporting sectors and organizations that will enrich the vitality of the region’s economy;
- Permit ready, shovel ready sites that show employers that the community is welcoming and ready to partner;
- Understand a location’s business identity outside the community, and develop the area’s identity to reflect the true capacity of the area;
- Develop leadership infrastructure to own and elevate the economic development strategy;
- Grounds the work in thorough upfront research, and development of metric tools – goals benchmarking and consistent evaluation to be able to measure progress, to be able to identify, respond and pivot to meet shifting economic dynamics.

== Breaking gender barriers in economic development ==
At the beginning of Morfessis’s career urban economic development was predominantly a male-dominated profession. Morfessis was typically one of very few female leaders in the room during her years at Greater Washington Business Center. During her tenure at Montgomery County Office of Economic Development, Morfessis was one of only two female cabinet members in the state of Maryland, and was in the company of only two other female economic development directors, in the National Capital region, Fairfax County’s economic development director April Young. Both Morfessis and Young would serve as two chairpersons of the International Economic Development Council. Morfessis attributes much of her success to the advantage of having many mentors from the beginning of her career, beginning with Charles W. Gilchrist, the executive at Montgomery County, MD . Because of those who mentored her, Morfessis makes a point of mentoring other young professionals, and has written on the importance of making space for women and other minorities, both in the field of economic development, and also in other professions. Although women in economic development is much more common now than when Morfessis began her career, still, only about 30 percent of these women hold leadership positions. Women economic development professionals are approximately 25 percent less than men’s salaries.

== Awards and publications ==
- November 14, 1997: Induction into the Arizona State University College of Public Programs Hall of Fame.
- 2000: The Baltimore Business Journal named her one of Baltimore's Most Influential leaders in 2000.
- November 2007: Key participant at the 106th American Assembly entitled "Retooling for Growth: Building a 21st Century Economy in America's Older Industrial Areas".
- 2007: Maricopa Community Colleges, Heroes of Education Award (2017)
- 2011: International Economic Development Council, Edward DeLuca Lifetime Achievement for Excellence Award
- 2012: Arizona’s Most Intriguing Women Award in celebration of the State of Arizona’s Centennial
- 2014:Economic Development Innovation Award, presented by FT Intelligence, a division of the Financial Times of London, in partnership with GIS Planning.

== Articles ==
- Economic Development Commentary, "Private/Public Partnerships: Economic Development Catalysts for the Future"
- Economic Development Review, "Greater Phoenix Meets Greater Chicago: A New Model for Building and Promoting Community Competitiveness"
- The Arizona Republic, "City that Keeps Moving Up"
- Economic Development Review, "Arizona's Defense/Economic Development Program"
- Economic Development Review, "A Cluster-Analytic Approach to Identifying and Developing State Target Industries: The Case of Arizona"
- Economic Development Commentary, "Corporate Social Responsibility in Economic Development"
- The Sun, "Investing in the Future with Adequate Funding for Higher Education"
- Featured and quoted in "Grassroots Leaders for a New Economy: How Civic Entrepreneurs are Building Prosperous Communities"
- The Arizona Republic Op-Ed, "Think Young, Think Arizona"
- IEDC Economic Development Journal, "Defining Economic Development Leadership for the 21st Century Globalized Economy: An Anthology of Leadership Perspectives"
- The Arizona Republic, "Arizona Needs to Develop, Stick to Vision for Growth"
- The Arizona Republic, "The Diverse Economy We Must Create"
- The Phoenix Business Journal, "My View: This Lemonade Will be Bitter Even with Sugar Added"
- The Arizona Republic, "Steps To Recovery Require Focus, Cooperation"
- The Arizona Republic, "Like Google, Apple and Uber? Thank an immigrant"

== Professional affiliations and community service ==
Morfessis has and continues to be involved with business and community leadership activities including:

- National Council for Urban Economic Development President 1992–1994
- International Economic Development Council Director 1986–1996, Honorary Lifetime Member
- Maricopa County Community Colleges Foundation Board Member
- Helios Foundation; co-founder and director, 2004-present
