= Joanna, Missouri =

Extinct hamlet in Missouri, U.S.

Coordinates: 39°32′27″N 91°40′10″W

Joanna is an extinct town in Ralls County, in the U.S. state of Missouri. The GNIS classifies it as a populated place.

A variant name was "Oakland". A post office called Joanna was established in 1895, and remained in operation until 1912. The community was named after Joanna Burnett, the mother of a local merchant.
