= Johanna (barge) =

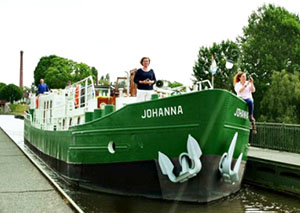
- Johanna crossing the Briare aqueduct

History

Belgium
- Name: Johanna
- Owner: KR-Line
- Operator: KR-Line
- Route: Bruges to Paris, Champagne, Loire
- Launched: 1966
- Acquired: 2012
- Status: In service

General characteristics
- Class & type: Commercial passenger vessel
- Tonnage: 300
- Displacement: 180
- Length: 32 m (105 ft)
- Beam: 5.09 m (16.7 ft)
- Height: 3.40 m (11.2 ft)
- Draught: 1.40 m (4.6 ft)
- Propulsion: single 310 horse power Deutz diesel
- Speed: cruising speed 11km/h (in open waters)
- Capacity: 6 passengers
- Crew: 3 crew
- Notes: Fuel capacity 6000 litres, Water capacity 13,000 litres, Grey water capacity 4500 litres

Johanna is a former working barge (péniche) of Freycinet dimensions, after the French minister of transport Charles de Freycinet who gave his name to an Act of Parliament in 1879, establishing a standard for French canals: they were to accommodate barges of 38.50 by 5.05m, carrying 250 tonnes to a draught of 1.80m. Thousands of such vessels were in operation on the network until the 1960s, when the decline in commercial traffic started. Many péniches were converted by their operators into permanent homes. Johanna is one of around 60 hotel barges offering cruises on European waterways, most of them in France.

== History ==
The barge was built in 1966 at the De Durme boatyard in Tielrode, Belgium (build number 365). The original Awa engine was replaced in the 1970s by a second-hand (built 1955) Deutz type RA8M428 direct-reverse, air-started, slow-running (600 rpm) engine developing 310 hp. At the same time the barge was lengthened to 42m. The principal cargoes were coal and iron between Germany and northern France. The owner ceased trading and shortened the barge to 32m in 1993, living aboard in Ham (Kwaadmechelen). The barge was acquired by the current owners in 2012.

== Hotel barge ==
Johanna was fitted out in 2012–13 with three cabins and bathrooms. The barge winters in Bruges, Belgium, while offering B&B, and relocates south each spring to cruise on the river Marne (Champagne region) and in the Upper Loire Valley (Canal lateral à la Loire).
