= Joanna Wilson =

Canadian toxicologist and physiologist

Joanna Yvonne Wilson (born 27 January 1970) is a Canadian aquatic toxicologist and physiologist. Wilson is a multidisciplinary scientist whose work intersects the fields of environmental physiology, biochemistry, toxicology, bioinformatics and functional genomics. Her research focuses on studying cytochrome P450 enzymes and the effects of environmental contaminants on marine and freshwater species, the most notable being the impact of pharmaceuticals in the environment. She is a professor in the department of biology at McMaster University in Hamilton, Ontario, Canada.

== Early life and education ==
Wilson was born in Barrie, Ontario, Canada. She completed her Honours Bachelor of Science in 1994 in Biology and Pharmacology at McMaster University and her Masters of Science in 1997 in Biology at the University of Victoria in Victoria, British Columbia, Canada, under the supervision of Richard Addison and B.W. Glickman. She then went on to complete her Ph.D. in 2003 in the Woods Hole Oceanographic Institution and the Massachusetts Institute of Technology joint graduate program in Woods Hole, Massachusetts USA, under the supervision of J.J. Stegeman. Her Ph.D. research focused on the functional characterization of cetacean aromatase and the phylogeny and functional conservation of vertebrate aromatases.

== Career ==
In 1992, Wilson started working as a research assistant for Janssen Pharmaceutica in Mississauga, ON, CA. From 1993 to 1994, Wilson worked as a research assistant at Environment and Climate Change Canada in Burlington, Ontario, Canada, under the supervision of Peter Hodson. In 1996, she did a work term as a research technician for the Department of Fisheries and Oceans Canada at the Institute of Ocean Sciences in Sidney, British Columbia, Canada, where she worked with Richard Addison. Following the completion of her Ph.D., Wilson started a post-doctoral investigator position at WHOI, where she remained from 2003 to 2006. It was during this time that Wilson's work evolved from basic to applied research, where she started investigating the roles that different families of cytochrome P450 play in detoxification of various pharmaceuticals and personal care products. Wilson notably collaborated with Ocean Alliance Whale Conservation on contaminant exposure in whales in the Gulf of California, Mexico.

Wilson started her tenure at McMaster University in June 2006, and became a full professor in July 2019. Since 2015, Wilson has been an associate member of the Psychology, Neurosciences and Behaviour Department at McMaster University, a guest investigator in the Department of Biology at the Woods Hole Oceanographic Institution, a guest investigator in the Department of Biological & Environmental Sciences, University of Gothenburg, and a special graduate faculty in the department of integrative biology, University of Guelph in Guelph, Ontario, Canada.

Wilson's work focuses on understanding how stressors (e.g. temperature, pharmaceuticals, personal care products, other organic contaminants) impact fish physiology, growth, development and reproduction, over multiple generations. She works with a variety of fish species, including zebrafish, lake and round whitefish and yellow perch.

Wilson is part of several professional organizations including: Society of Toxicology and Chemistry (1997–present), Canadian Society of Zoology (2006–present), Society of Toxicology (2009–present), International Society for the Study of Xenobiotics (2009–present), and Radiation Research Society (2018–present). She was previously part of the Centre for Marine Evolutionary Biology (2012–2015) and the Society for Marine Mammalogy (1997–2007).

=== Awards ===
- 2019 – University Scholar, McMaster University
- 2015 – YWCA Hamilton, Woman of Distinction Award, Science and Technology, Hamilton, ON
- 2011–2013 - Natural Science and Engineering Research Council (NSERC) Accelerator Supplement program award
- 2011–2016 – Early Researcher Award
- 1997–1999 – Natural Science and Engineering Research Council (NSERC) postgraduate B scholarship, tenable outside of Canada for two years

== Selected publications ==
- Michal Galus, Judy Jeyaranjaan, Emily Smith, Hongxia Li, Chris Metcalfe, Joanna Y Wilson. 2013. Chronic effects of exposure to a pharmaceutical mixture and municipal wastewater in zebrafish. Aquatic Toxicology, Volume 132, pages 212–222.
- Michal Galus, Nina Kirischian, Sarah Higgins, James Purdy, Justin Chow, Sahaana Rangaranjan, Hongxia Li, Chris Metcalfe, Joanna Y Wilson. 2013. Chronic, low concentration exposure to pharmaceuticals impacts multiple organ systems in zebrafish. Aquatic Toxicology, Volume 132, pages 200–211.
- Peter V Hodson, Susan Efler, Joanna Y Wilson, Abdel El-Shaarawi, Michelle Maj, Todd G Williams. 1996. Measuring the potency of pulp mill effluents for induction of hepatic mixed-function oxygenase activity in fish. Journal of Toxicology and Environmental Health, Volume 94(1), pages 83–110.
- Carly F Graham, Travis C Glenn, Andrew G McArthur, Douglas R Boreham, Troy Kieran, Stacey Lance, Richard G Manzon, Jessica A Martino, Todd Pierson, Sean M Rogers, Joanna Y Wilson, Christopher M Somers. 2015. Impacts of degraded DNA on restriction enzyme associated DNA sequencing (RADS eq). Molecular Ecology Resources, Volume 15(6), pages 1304–1315.
- Edyta J Jasinska, Greg G Goss, Patricia L Gillis, Glen J Van Der Kraak, Jacqueline Matsumoto, Anderson A de Souza Machado, Marina Giacomin, Thomas W Moon, Andrey Massarsky, Francois Gagné, Mark R Servos, Joanna Wilson, Tamanna Sultana, Chris D Metcalfe. 2015. Assessment of biomarkers for contaminants of emerging concern on aquatic organisms downstream of a municipal wastewater discharge. Science of the Total Environment, Volume 530, pages 140–153.
