= Lorraine Warren (academic) =

New Zealand researcher (died 2022)

- Died: 2022
- Education: University of Wales
- Scientific career
- Fields: Synthetic organic chemistry, innovation and entrepreneurship
- Workplaces: Loughborough University, University of Southampton, Massey University

Lorraine Warren (died 2022) was a British academic who for some years worked in New Zealand. Trained as a chemist, she was a full professor at Massey University from 2014 to 2019 in entrepreneurship and innovation research.

== Career ==
Warren gained a Bachelor of Science (hons) in chemistry from the University of Wales in 1980. After receiving a PhD in synthetic organic chemistry at the University of Wales in 1983, she worked from 1983 to 1985 as a research associate in the Department of Chemistry at the Binghamton University in the United States. From 1985 to 1990, she worked as an educational consultant at Boulsworth Educational Services in Lancashire, England. In 1991, she graduated with a Master of Science in computing from the University of Bradford. From 1993 to 1995, Warren was a lecturer at the School of IT at Hull College in Kingston upon Hull, England. From 1995 to 2002, she was a senior lecturer in the Department of Corporate Strategy at the University of Lincoln.

Warren moved into the field of innovation and entrepreneurship, working at Loughborough University (2002–2004) and University of Southampton (2004–2014) in the UK, before moving to Massey University as a full professor commencing on 1 July 2014. She returned to the UK in 2019. She was a review for The International Journal of Entrepreneurship and Innovation.

== Illness and death ==
Warren was ill during most of 2021, but kept working and did not publicly share that she was unwell. She died in early 2022. (Note: Warren last tweeted on 18 January 2022. Dr Robert Smith from the University of the West of Scotland wrote in his obituary for Warren "that on the 7th of March 2022, we as a close-knit research community learned of the untimely death of Lorraine".) Her funeral was on 4 March 2022.

== Selected works ==
- Simon Down; Lorraine Warren (18 January 2008). "Constructing narratives of enterprise: clichés and entrepreneurial self‐identity". International Journal of Entrepreneurial Behaviour and Research. 14 (1): 4–23. doi:10.1108/13552550810852802. ISSN 1355-2554. Wikidata Q62548122.
- Alistair R. Anderson; Lorraine Warren (16 August 2011). "The entrepreneur as hero and jester: Enacting the entrepreneurial discourse". International Small Business Journal. 29 (6): 589–609. doi:10.1177/0266242611416417. ISSN 0266-2426. Wikidata Q62547557.
- Lorraine Warren (February 2004). "Negotiating Entrepreneurial Identity: Communities of Practice and Changing Discourses". International Journal of Entrepreneurship and Innovation. 5 (1): 25–35. doi:10.5367/000000004772913764. ISSN 1465-7503. Wikidata Q125589211.
- Lorraine Warren (12 January 2004). "A systemic approach to entrepreneurial learning: an exploration using storytelling". Systems Research and Behavioral Science. 21 (1): 3–16. doi:10.1002/sres.543. ISSN 1099-1743. Wikidata Q62548506.
- D. Patton; L. Warren; D. Bream (20 February 2009). "Elements that underpin high-tech business incubation processes". Journal of Technology Transfer. 34 (6): 621–636. doi:10.1007/s10961-009-9105-7. ISSN 0892-9912. Wikidata Q62547938.
- Mette Lindahl Thomassen; Karen Williams Middleton; Michael Breum Ramsgaard; Helle Neergaard; Lorraine Warren (3 August 2020). "Conceptualizing context in entrepreneurship education: a literature review". International Journal of Entrepreneurial Behaviour and Research. 26 (5): 863–886. ISSN 1355-2554. Wikidata Q125589919.
