= Joanna Wallace =

British novelist

- Occupation: Novelist

Joanna Wallace is an English novelist.

== Biography ==
Wallace studied law at the University of Birmingham and subsequently worked as a commercial lawyer in London. She suffered from an autoimmune disease and lost part of her sight, forcing her to give up her profession. Since then, she has been involved with the Samaritans and runs a small family business with her husband.

In 2023, Wallace's debut novel, You'd Look Better as a Ghost, a dark comedy about serial killer Claire, was published. The website *Crime Fiction Lovers* rated the book as the best debut novel of 2023. In the United States, the novel was published by Penguin Books and selected as Barnes & Noble's Thriller of the Month in April 2024. It subsequently became a USA Today bestseller. The idea for the novel came to her when her father developed dementia and later passed away; the protagonist's dark humor was her way of coping with grief.

In 2024, The Dead Friend Project, a mystery novel in which the protagonist investigates the death of her best friend, was published.

The Art of Getting Hammered, a sequel to Wallace's debut novel, followed in 2026.

== Personal life ==
Wallace lives with her husband in Buckinghamshire. The couple has four children.

== Bibliography ==
- You'd Look Better as a Ghost. Viper. 28 November 2023. ISBN 9781800811300.
- The Dead Friend Project. Viper. 11 July 2024. ISBN 9781800811348.
- The Art of Getting Hammered. Viper. 8 June 2026. ISBN 9781805224242.
