= Joanna Truffaut =

French advisor, entrepreneur

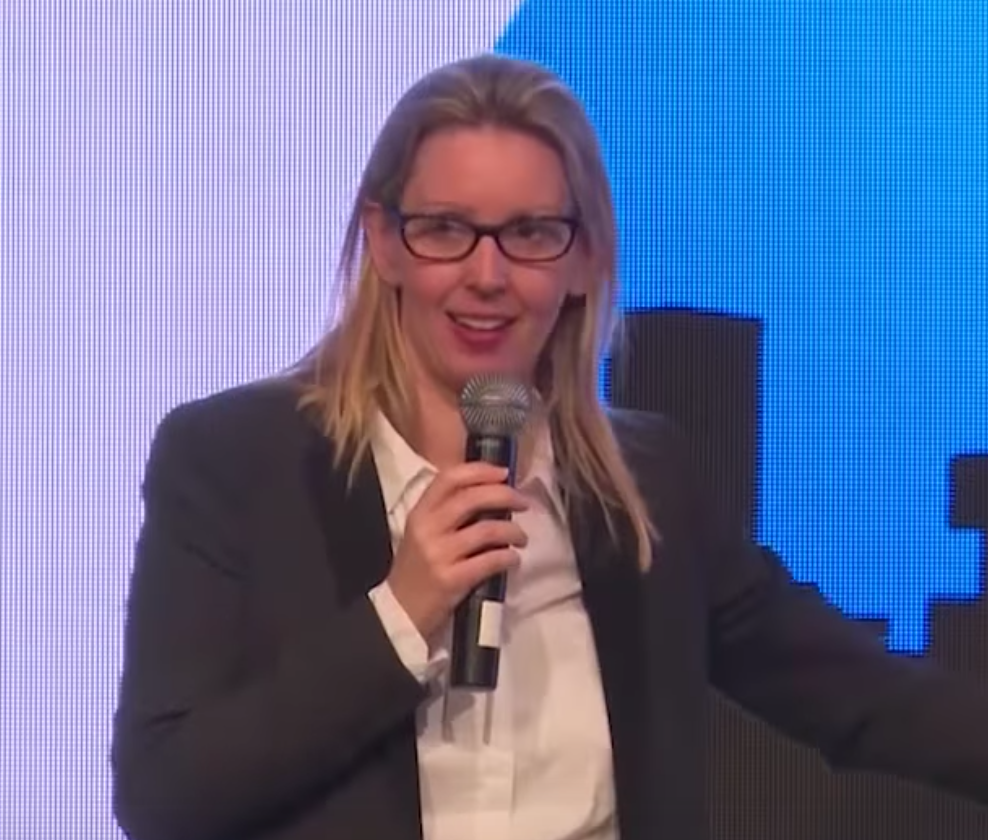
- Truffaut at the eGov4 Conference
- Born: 1977 (age 48–49)
- Education: Institut Mines-Télécom, Virginia Tech
- Occupations: Advisor, Businesswoman, Entrepreneur

Joanna Truffaut (born 15 October 1977) is a French entrepreneur and advisor known for her work in digital transformation, smart cities and luxury real estate. She initially gained recognition for developing public Wi-Fi networks in the United States and France and later founded several technology ventures in the Middle East. Truffaut is now the Founder and Managing Partner of Bond Properties Global, a Dubai and Abu Dhabi-based real estate brokerage specializing in prime and ultra-prime properties for high-net-worth investors. Truffaut is an alumna of Institut Mines-Télécom and of Virginia Tech.

== Early life and education ==
Joanna Truffaut was born on 15 October 1977, in France. Joanna's earlier career includes two higher educations, from Institut Mines-Télécom and an exchange affiliated program from Virginia Tech.[1][2]

When talking about her experience at the Institut Mines-Telecom, Joanna exclaims that she was inspired to proceed with her dual degree in management and telecom engineering at the university, after in CM2 class she was asked who she wanted to be when she grew up; and she quickly realized that the idea of computers revolutionizing the world was something she wanted to be a part of.

She aspired to innovate and make a difference, even though, at the time, she had limited knowledge on both business and engineering. In her third year of Institut Mines-Télécom, she was fortunate to get an offer for an exchange experience as a part of an International Business Engineering Program, partnered with Virginia Tech, in the United States. Those opportunities resulted in her gaining knowledge and experience in her desired field of expertise and not that much later bringing her skills to Dubai, where she got a chance to work on a local contract. Overall, in one of her interviews, Joanna concluded that her experience at Institut Mines-Télécom allowed her to master “the language of ICT and business technologies and provided her with information on how to be a leader in large scale projects."

== Career ==
2001 In 2001, Truffaut became a member of NYC wireless executive team, a non-profit organization that advocates and enables the growth of free, public wireless Internet access in New York City and surrounding areas, and cofounded by Anthony M. Townsend.

2003 Subsequently, in 2003, Truffaut co-founded Paris Open Network, which aimed to enable the growth of free Wi-Fi networks in the city of Paris. She became a recognised figure in France for the evangelisation of free urban Wi-Fi networks and co-wrote her first book. During that time period in Europe, she worked in the ICT Innovation transfer field for a branch of the French Ministry of Industry and Economy and then for a start-up, Cityneo, which later got bought out by Pure Agency.

2012 After her move to the Middle East, Truffaut founded Ibtikarati, the first start-up platform in the Middle East in 2012, which allowed entrepreneurs to sell their apps through the online portal.

2013 In 2013, she founded Ejaba.com, an online business Q&A platform in the Middle East, that allowed entrepreneurs to ask business related questions to a network of experts against a fee.

=== Strategy consulting (2015–2019) ===
From 2016 to 2019 Truffaut worked as a strategy consultant at Ernst & Young, advising primarily government entities on digital transformation and related programs, whilst remaining active in start-up through her mentoring and hackathon judging activities.

=== Real estate (2023–present) ===
In September 2023 Truffaut founded Bond Properties Global, a brokerage operating in Dubai and Abu Dhabi and advising high-net-worth investors on prime and ultra-prime acquisitions including Palm Jumeirah, Emirates Hills, and Saadiyat Island.

== Le guide du Wi-Fi et du Bluetooth ==
In translation from French, the book title is: The Wi-fi and Bluetooth Guide. This book was authored by Joanna Truffaut, Guy de Lussingny and Bertrand Grossier. It was published in 2004 and originally written in French, containing 704 pages. Le guide du Wi-Fi et du Bluetooth essentially describes a new vision of the world of computing. Wi-fi and Bluetooth are the two most dominant and applicable notions when talking about Wireless technologies.

== Bibliography ==
- Le guide du Wi-Fi et du Bluetooth by Joanna Truffaut, Guy de Lussigny, Bertrand Grossier - Editions Eska, January 2004 - ISBN 2747206165
- L’annee des TIC by Joanna Truffaut, Michel Berne – INT – Laboratoire OSTIC, 2005
- Territoires et sociétés de l'information en France by Bruno Salgues with Joanna Truffaut contribution - CRITIC, 2003
