= Jo Bensemann =

New Zealand management academic

Joanne Bensemann

Academic background
- Education: University of Canterbury
- Thesis: Copreneurship in Rural Tourism Exploring Women's Experiences (2009)
- Doctoral advisor: C. Michael Hall

Joanne Marie Cheyne Bensemann, also known as Joanne Cheyne, is a New Zealand management academic, and is a full professor at Massey University, specialising in innovation, tourism, management and entrepreneurship. As of 2024 she is Head of the School of Management.

== Academic career ==
Bensemann has a Bachelor of Business Studies (1991) and a Master of Business Studies in Management (1993) both from Massey University. She later completed a PhD titled Copreneurship in Rural Tourism Exploring Women's Experiences at the University of Canterbury in 2010. Bensemann joined the faculty of Massey University in 1991, rising to full professor in 2023. Bensemann was Associate Head of the School of Management at Massey for five years, following which she was appointed Head in 2019.

Bensemann's research covers human resource management, tourism, innovation and entrepreneurship, and she has looked at entrepreneurship in rural settings, "copreneurship" (when partners are in business together), women in business, agribusiness, and sustainability. She has worked as a consultant with the Tourism Industry Association of New Zealand, on issues such as environmental certification schemes, Green Globe 21, and visitor perceptions of sustainability. She helped the New Plymouth District Council to develop strategic plans for festivals, and was contracted by the Inland Revenue to research SMEs and regulation management. Bensemann also co-supervised a student examining how to achieve a more inclusive culture for women in the New Zealand Army.

== Selected works ==
- Deakins, David; Bensemann, Joanne Cheyne; Martina Battisti (2016). "Entrepreneurial skill and regulation: Evidence from primary sector rural entrepreneurs: Evidence from primary sector rural entrepreneurs". International Journal of Entrepreneurial Behaviour and Research. 22 (2): 234–259. doi:10.1108/ijebr-12-2014-0240. Wikidata Q125584761.
- Nguyen Phuc Canh; Su Dinh Thanh; Christophe Schinckus; Bensemann, Joanne Cheyne; Lai Trung Thanh (2019). "Global emissions: A new contribution from the shadow economy". International Journal of Energy Economics and Policy. 9 (3): 320–337. doi:10.32479/ijeep.7244. Wikidata Q125584683.
- Nguyen Minh; Majid Khan; Bensemann, Joanne Cheyne (2021). "Corporate social responsibility in Vietnam: Systematic review of research and future directions". Society and Business Review. 17 (1): 92–119. doi:10.1108/sbr-09-2020-0114. Wikidata Q125584672.
- Mika, Jason Paul; Nicolas Fahey; Bensemann, Joanne Cheyne (2019). "What counts as an indigenous enterprise? Evidence from Aotearoa New Zealand". Journal of Enterprising Communities. 13 (3): 372–390. doi:10.1108/jec-12-2018-0102. Wikidata Q125584682.
- Anderson, Alistair; Warren, Lorraine; Bensemann, Joanne Cheyne (2018). "Identity, Enactment, and Entrepreneurship Engagement in a Declining Place". Journal of Small Business Management. 57 (4): 1559–1577. doi:10.1111/jsbm.12406. Wikidata Q125584719.
