= Johanna Meeuwsen =

South African missionary (1857–1942)

Johanna Meeuwsen (26 May 1857 – 30 January 1942) was a South African missionary of Dutch descent. She was the first single woman missionary of the Dutch Reformed Church (DRC) in the Transvaal.

== Biography ==
Meeuwsen was born in Wellington, Cape Province, to Dutch parents. She was a member of the inaugural class of the Huguenot Seminary for girls (later the Huguenot College) in Wellington.

In 1875, Meeuwsen became the first single woman missionary to go to the DRC’s mission field in the northwestern Transvaal. She had trained for a single year before her mission. With Sarie Horak, Meeuwsen learned the Setswana language and started a school for children of the Batlhako tribe, which was funded by the Huguenot Seminary. At the school, children were converted to Christianity and prayer meetings and singing lessons were held, despite malaria attacks.
