= Fred Genesee =

Professor of psychology at McGill University

- Occupation: Psychologist

Academic background
- Education: McGill University

Academic work
- Discipline: Psychology
- Sub-discipline: Second language immersion, bilingualism, bilingual education, bilingual first language acquisition
- Institutions: McGill University

Fred Genesee is a professor emeritus of psychology at McGill University known for his work on second language acquisition and bilingualism.

Genesee is a former president of TESOL International Association, and was the winner of the 2004 Canadian Psychological Association Award for Distinguished Contributions to Public or Community Service, the 2014 Canadian Psychological Association Gold Medal Award For Distinguished Lifetime Contributions to Canadian Psychology, the 2016 Canadian Association of Second Languages Honorary Lifetime Member Award, and the 2024 International Association for the Study of Child Language Roger Brown Award.

== Selected publications ==
- Genesee, F., Sánchez-López, C., &, Young. T. (2022). Welcoming Bilingual Learners with Disabilities in Dual Language. Programs. Centre for Applied Linguistics: Washington, D.C.
- Genesee, F., & Tedick, D.J. (2021). Issues and Perspectives on Student Diversity in Content-Based Language Education. Guest Editors, Special Issue of Journal of Immersion and Content-Based Language Education, V.9.2. John Benjamins.
- Genesee, F., & Hamayan, E. (2016). CLIL in Context: Practical Guidance for Educators. Cambridge University Press.
- Genesee, F. & Delcenserie, A. (2016). Starting Over -- The Language Development in Internationally-Adopted Children. Amsterdam: John Benjamins.
- Mehisto, P., & Genesee, F. (Eds). (2015). Building Bilingual Education Systems: Forces, Mechanisms and Counterweights. Cambridge, U.K.: Cambridge University Press.
- Hamayan, E., Genesee, F., & Cloud, N. (2013). Dual Language Instruction: From A to Z. Portsmouth, N.H.: Heinle & Heinle.
- Paradis, J., Genesee, F., & Crago, M. (2011). Dual Language Development and Disorders: A Handbook on Bilingualism and Second Language Learning (2nd Edit.). Baltimore, MD: Brookes.
- Genesee, F., Lindholm-Leary, K., Saunders, W. & Christian, D. (2006). Educating English language learners: A synthesis of research evidence. NY: Cambridge University Press.
- Genesee, F., Paradis, J., & Crago (Eds.) (2004). Dual Language Development and Disorders: A Handbook on Bilingualism and Second Language Learning. Baltimore, Maryland: Brookes Publishing.
- Cenoz, J., & Genesee, F. (Eds.) (2001). Trends in Bilingual Acquisition. Amsterdam: John Benjamin.
- Christian, D., & Genesee, F. (Eds.) (2001) Bilingual Education. Alexandria, VA: TESOL.
- Cloud, N., Genesee, F., & Hamayan, E. (2000). Dual Language Instruction: A Handbook for Enriched Education. Portsmouth, NH: Heinle & Heinle.
- Cenoz, J., & Genesee, F., (1998). Beyond Bilingualism: Multilingualism and Multilingual Education. Clevedon, England: Multilingual Matters.
- Genesee, F., & Upshur, J. (1996). Classroom-based evaluation in second language education. NY: Cambridge University Press.
- Genesee, F. (1994). Educating second language children: The whole child, the whole curriculum, the whole community. NY: Cambridge University Press.
- Genesee, F. (1987). Learning through two languages: Studies of immersion and bilingual education. Cambridge, MA: Newbury House.
