= Joanna (opera) =

Méhul in 1799 – portrait by Antoine Gros

Joanna is an opéra comique in two acts by the French composer Étienne Méhul. It premiered at the Opéra-Comique, Paris on 23 November 1802. The libretto, by Benoît-Joseph Marsollier, is a revision of the same author's Emma, ou Le soupçon, set by Étienne Fay in 1799. The piece was not a success and only enjoyed eight performances.

== Roles ==
Role	Voice type	Premiere Cast
Amélie, under the name Joanna, the wife of Sir Hervey	soprano	Julie-Angélique Scio
Sir Hervey, under the name Charles, jealous, but deeply in love with his wife	tenor	Jean-Baptiste-Sauveur Gavaudan
Springle, a businessman, garrulous and a little self-interested, but with an excellent heart	basse-taille (bass-baritone)	Antoine Juillet "père" (father)
Lord Hervey, governor of Madras under the name the Duke of Duncan	baritone	Jean-Pierre Solié
Sir Édouard, second son of Lord Hervey, hotheaded but honest	tenor	Pierre Gaveaux
Tomi, the son of Joanna and Charles	soprano (travesti role)	Anne-Marie Simonet
A black slave belonging to Édouard	soprano (travesti role)	Mlle Chevalier
Chorus: Followers of the Duke of Duncan; blacks; English soldiers; Indians

== Synopsis ==
Scene: Madras in India
By marrying Amélie, the son of Lord Hervey has brought disgrace on his family and is forced to leave the country. Under the assumed name Charles, he works as a carpenter in Madras and Amélie lives with him under the name Joanna. However, Charles becomes jealous of a young army officer Édouard. Believing Édouard is trying to seduce his wife, Charles challenges him to a duel. The governor of Madras hears the news and, charmed by Joanna, decides to intervene. The governor realises that both Charles and Édouard are his sons. Édouard has been only lightly wounded in the duel. The two brothers embrace and the opera ends happily.

== Sources ==
- Adélaïde de Place Étienne Nicolas Méhul (Bleu Nuit Éditeur, 2005)
- Arthur Pougin Méhul: sa vie, son génie, son caractère (Fischbacher, 1889)
- General introduction to Méhul's operas in the introduction to the edition of Stratonice by M. Elizabeth C. Bartlet (Pendragon Press, 1997)
- Original libretto at Google Books
