= Johanna Schipper =

Taiwanese-born French cartoonist and writer

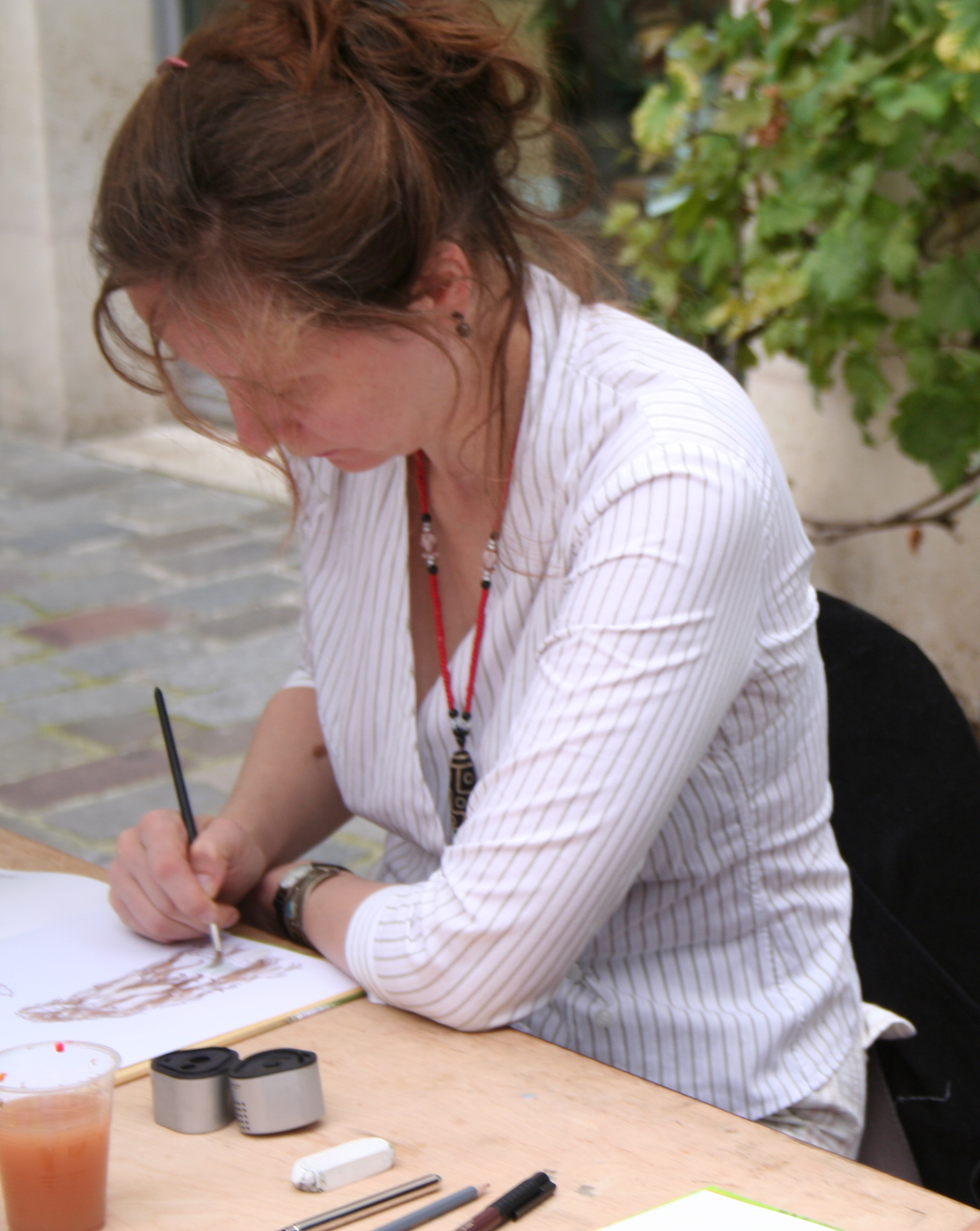
- Johanna Schipper at the 2006 Festival Delcourt
- Born: Johanna Schipper; 1967 (age 58–59) Changhua, Taiwan
- Areas: Cartoonist, Artist, Colourist
- Pseudonym: Johanna
- Awards: Prix Artémisia

Johanna Schipper (born 1967), known by the pen name Johanna and more rarely as Nina, is a Taiwanese-born French bande dessinée comic book cartoonist, short story writer, and educator of Dutch heritage. She is a laureate of the 2008 Prix Artémisia for women's comics.

== Early life and education ==
She was born in 1967 in Taiwan, to a Dutch mother and a sinologist father. She lived there until the age of three and a half, and then followed her parents to the Netherlands and then to France, where the Schipper family settled in 1974.

After graduating from high school, she studied comics at the École européenne supérieure de l'image (ÉESI) (European School of Image) in Angoulême.

== Career ==
She began working as a colorist, notably with Emmanuel Moynot on the series Le Temps des bombes published in the early 1990s and with Farid Boudjellal on the album Le Beurgeois published in 1997.

From 1993 until 2000, she published short stories for fanzines and illustrations for young people. In 1999, she resumed the adventures of Nana, the heroine of Les Phosfées, five of which were published in black and white in the French comic magazines Le Lézard, PLG, or Ogoun! between 1995 and 1997, and she reproduced them in color in the youth collection of Delcourt, dedicating these albums to the universe of dreams.

Moving away from the field of comics for youth, she proposed an album largely autobiographical, Née quelque part, published in 2004 (later translated into Chinese), where she returned to the places of her childhood in Taiwan,

This was followed in 2006 by Une par une and in 2007 by Nos âmes sauvages, which won the 2008 Prix Artémisia for women's comics. In the early 2010s, she published a diptych, Le Printemps refleurira.

Since 2010, Schipper has been teaching at the ÉESI in Angoulême5.

== Awards ==
- 2008, Artémisia Prize for the female comic strip for Nos âmes sauvages

== Selected works ==
- Les Phosfées, Delcourt, coll. "Jeunesse", 3 vol., 2000–2002.
- Née quelque part, Delcourt, coll. "Mirages", 2004 ISBN 2-84789-043-2
- Une par une, Éditions de l'an 2, coll. "Traits féminins", 2005 (writing as "Nina") ISBN 2-84856-025-8
  Expanded reissue of a story and under the name "Johanna", La Boîte à bulles, 2010 ISBN 978-2-84953-111-2.
- Les Six Cygnes (according to the tale of the brothers Grimm), Delcourt, coll. "Jeunesse", 2006
- Nos âmes sauvages, Futuropolis, 2007 ISBN 978-2-7548-0073-0. Prix Artémisia 2008.
- Le printemps refleurira, Futuropolis, 2 vol., 2010 ISBN 978-2-7548-0202-4
