= Joanne Stoker =

British footwear designer

- Born: 1983 or 1984 (age 42–43)
- Education: Cordwainers College
- Occupation: Shoe designer

Joanne Stoker (born 1983/1984) is a British footwear designer.

Stoker earned a master's degree in footwear design from London's Cordwainers College.

Stoker worked for Jimmy Choo, before starting her own eponymous footwear label in 2011.

Stoker has collaborated with the fashion label Dune, and with fellow designer Matthew Williamson.

Her studio is in London's Hoxton district.
