= Neuroscience of multilingualism =

Neuroscience of multilingualism is the study of multilingualism within the field of neurology. These studies include the representation of different language systems in the brain, the effects of multilingualism on the brain's structural plasticity, aphasia in multilingual individuals, and bimodal bilinguals (people who can speak at least one sign language and at least one oral language). Neurological studies of multilingualism are carried out with functional neuroimaging, electrophysiology, and through observation of people who have suffered brain damage.

The brain contains areas that are specialized to deal with language, located in the perisylvian cortex of the left hemisphere. These areas are crucial for performing language tasks, but they are not the only areas that are used; disparate parts of both the right and left brain hemispheres are active during language production. In multilingual individuals, there is a great deal of similarity in the brain areas used for each of their languages. Insights into the neurology of multilingualism have been gained by the study of multilingual individuals with aphasia, or the loss of one or more languages as a result of brain damage. Bilingual aphasics can show several different patterns of recovery; they may recover one language but not another, they may recover both languages simultaneously, or they may involuntarily mix different languages during language production during the recovery period. These patterns are explained by the dynamic view of bilingual aphasia, which holds that the language system of representation and control is compromised as a result of brain damage.

Research has also been carried out into the neurology of bimodal bilinguals, or people who can speak at least one oral language and at least one sign language. Studies with bimodal bilinguals have also provided insight into the tip of the tongue phenomenon, working memory, and patterns of neural activity when recognizing facial expressions, signing, and speaking.

== Overview ==
=== Centralization of language areas in the brain ===
Language acquisition in multilingual individuals is contingent on two factors: age of the language acquisition and proficiency. Specialization is centered in the perisylvian cortex of the left hemisphere. Various regions of both the right and left hemisphere activate during language production. Multilingual individuals consistently demonstrate similar activation patterns in the brain when using either one of the two or more languages they fluently know. Age of acquiring the second-or-higher language, and proficiency of use determine what specific brain regions and pathways activate when using (thinking or speaking) the language. In contrast to those who acquired multiple languages at different points in their life, those who acquire multiple languages when young, and at virtually the same time, show similar activations in parts of Broca's area and left inferior frontal lobe. If the second-or-higher language is acquired later in life, specifically after the critical period, the language becomes centralized in a different part of Broca's area than the native language and other languages learned when young.

=== Brain plasticity in multilingualism ===
A greater density of grey matter in the inferior parietal cortex is present in multilingual individuals. It has been found that multilingualism affects the structure, and essentially, the cytoarchitecture of the brain. Learning multiple languages re-structures the brain and some researchers argue that it increases the brain's capacity for plasticity. Language learning boosts brain plasticity and the brain's ability to code new information. Early language learning plays a significant role in the formation of memory circuits for learning new information. Most of these differences in brain structures in multilinguals may be genetic at the core. Consensus is still muddled; it may be a mixture of both—experiential (acquiring languages during life) and genetic (predisposition to brain plasticity).

Experience can change both the function and the structure of the brain. Event-related brain potentials (ERPs) reflect synchronized postsynaptic activity in cortical pyramidal neurons. ERPs can be used to track learning-related changes in brain function. Semantic anomalies elicit a negative wave which suggests the separation between semantic and syntactic processing

Heightened brain plasticity in infants impacts later language development. Recent studies show that even brief exposure to a language in infancy changes how the brain processes a second-language acquisition. Participants in the studies who had transient language exposure as an infant or were multilingual showed greater brain activation in non-verbal working memory patterns, compared to monolingual speakers. The measure of uncommitted neural circuitry in infants can be accounted for in the perception of nonnative language at early stages of language acquisition. Research has shown that infants who show proficiency in nonnative phonetic perception at 7 months have slower language development than those who show proficiency in native phonetic perception. This research supports the Native Language Magnet/Neural Commitment Theory originally proposed by Patricia K. Kuhl.

=== Aphasia in multilingualism ===
Insights into language storage in the brain have come from studying multilingual individuals afflicted with a form of aphasia. The symptoms and severity of aphasia in multilingual individuals depend on the number of languages the individual knows, what order they learned them, and thus have them stored in the brain, the age at which they learned them, how frequently each language is used, and how proficient the individual is in using those languages. Two primary theoretical approaches to studying and viewing multilingual aphasics exist—the localizationalist approach and the dynamic approach. The localizationalist approach views different languages as stored in different regions of the brain, explaining why multilingual aphasics may lose one language they know, but not the other(s). The dynamical theory (or shared representation) approach suggests that the language system is supervised by a dynamic equilibrium between the existing language capabilities and the constant alteration and adaptation to the communicative requirements of the environment. The dynamic approach views the representation and control aspects of the language system as compromised as a result of brain damage to the brain's language regions. The dynamic approach offers a satisfactory explanation for the various recovery times of each of the languages the aphasic has had impaired or lost because of the brain damage. Recovery of languages varies across aphasic patients. Some may recover all lost or impaired languages simultaneously. For some, one language is recovered before the others. In others, an involuntary mix of languages occurs in the recovery process; they intermix words from the various languages they know when speaking. Research affirms with the two approaches combined into the amalgamated hypothesis, it states that while languages do share some parts of the brain, they can also be allotted to some separate areas that are neutral.

Aphasia in multilinguals (or bilinguals) is commonly assessed through a Bilingual Aphasia Test (or BAT). The BAT consists of 3 sections that patients are required to answer with continuously as the test administrators record their answers. Patients' performances are then documented and processed with computer programs that determine the percentages of correctness given the specific linguistic skill. With the BAT many clinical settings have a standardized system of determining the extent of aphasia in the multilingual patients.

=== PET scan studies on bimodal individuals ===
Neuroscientific research on bimodal individuals—those who speak one oral language and one sign language—has been carried out. PET scans from these studies show that there is a separate region in the brain for working memory related to sign language production and use. These studies also find that bimodal individuals use different areas of the right hemisphere depending on whether they are speaking using verbal language or gesticulating using sign language. Studies with bimodal bilinguals have also provided insight into the tip of the tongue phenomenon and into patterns of neural activity when recognizing facial expressions.

=== Role of the executive control system in preventing cross talk ===
There are sophisticated mechanisms to prevent cross talk in brains where more than one language is stored. The executive control system might be implicated to prevent one language from interfering with another in multilinguals. The executive control system is responsible for processes that are sometimes referred to as executive functions, and among others includes supervisory attentional system, or cognitive control. Although most research on the executive control system pertains to nonverbal tasks, there is some evidence that the system might be involved in resolving and ordering the conflict generated by the competing languages stored in the multilingual's brain. During speech production there is a constant need to channel attention to the appropriate word associated with the concept, congruent with the language being used. The word must be placed in the appropriate phonological and morphological context. Multilinguals constantly utilize the general executive control system to resolve interference/conflicts among the known languages, enhancing the system's functional performance, even on nonverbal tasks. In studies, multilingual subjects of all ages showed overall enhanced executive control abilities. This may indicate that the multilingual experience leads to a transfer of skill from the verbal to the nonverbal. Recent meta-analyses do not show any support for this assumed cognitive advantage. There is no one specific domain of language modulation in the general executive control system, as far as studies reveal. Studies show that the speed with which multilingual subjects perform tasks, with and without mediation required to resolve language-use conflict, is better in bilingual than monolingual subjects.

=== Health effects of multilingualism and bilingualism ===
Despite the growth of multilingualism in different parts of the world, there are controversies on the positive and negative impacts of bilingualism on the education of children. Studies have brought part of the answer to frequent questions such as: are bilingual children distressed? Does multilingualism make children smarter? Defenders of multilingualism assert that speaking another language contributes to an intelligent and healthy brain whereas opponents of multilingualism vehemently insist that speaking another language does not make children smarter and that on the contrary, it can disturb their learning journey. Researcher Ellen Bialystok examined the effect of multilingualism on Alzheimer's disease and found that it delays its onset by about 4 years. The researcher's study found that those who spoke two or more languages showed symptoms of Alzheimer's disease at a later time than speakers of a single language. The study found that the more languages the multilingual knows, the later the onset of Alzheimer's disease. Lexical deficit results from second language acquisition. A research in 2025 found that multilingualism may delay aging.

=== Functional neuroimaging and language organization in the human brain ===
Work in the field of cognitive neuroscience has located classical language areas within the perisylvian cortex of the left hemisphere. This area is crucial for the representation of language, but other areas in the brain are shown to be active in this function as well. Language-related activation occurs in the middle and inferior temporal gyri, the temporal pole, the fusiform gyri, the lingula, in the middle prefrontal areas (i.e. dorsolateral prefrontal cortex), and in the insula. There also appears to be activation in the right hemisphere during most language tasks.

Language-related areas are dedicated to certain components of language processing (e.g. lexical semantics). These areas are functionally characterized by linguistically pertinent systems, such as phonology, syntax, and lexical semantics—and not in speaking, reading, and listening. In the normal human brain, areas associated with linguistic processing are less rigid than previously thought. For example, increased familiarity with a language has been found to lead to decreases in brain activation in left dorsolateral frontal cortex (Brodmann areas, 9, 10, 46).

=== Language production in bilinguals ===
Bilingualism involves the use of two languages by an individual or community. Neuroimaging studies of bilingualism generally focus on a comparison of activated areas when using the first language (L1) and second language (L2). Studies of language production which employ functional neuroimaging methods, investigate the cerebral representation of language activity in bilinguals. These methods (i.e. PET and fMRI) separate subjects mainly on basis of age of L2 acquisition and not on proficiency level in L2.

With the use of PET in the study of late learners, regional cerebral blood flow (rCBF) distribution has been found to be comparable between L1 and L2. Repetition of words engages overlapping neural structures across both languages; whereas, differences in neural activation are only observed in the left putamen when individuals repeat words in their second language. The putamen, therefore, plays a critical role because the articulation process places greater demand on brain resources, when one is producing a second language learned late in life.

Word generation tasks including rhyme generation (phonological bases), synonym generation (semantic search bases), and translation (lexical access to other language) are used to observe lexical-semantics. Word generation has been shown to cause significant activation in the left dorsolateral frontal cortex (Brodmann areas 9, 45, 46, 47). Considerable overlie has been found in the frontal areas, regardless of task requirements (rhymes or synonyms) and language used (L1 or L2). Selective activation is observed in the left putamen when words are generated in the second language (i.e. increased rCBF in left putamen resulting from L2-L1 subtractions). Even when the second language is acquired later in life (up to age five), L2 production in highly proficient bilinguals reveals activation of similar brain regions as that in L1.

Word generation (phonemic verbal fluency) has also led to larger foci of brain activation for the least fluent language(s) within multilinguals (observed using fMRI). Regardless of language, however, activation is principally found in the left prefrontal cortex (inferior frontal, middle frontal, and precentral gyri). Additionally, activation can be observed in the supplementary motor area and parietal lobe. This activation is larger for L3 than L2 and L1, and less for L1 than for L2. Familiarity with a language reduces the brain activation required for its use.

==== Age of second language acquisition ====
Language acquisition appears to play a large role in the cortical organization involved in second language processing. Using functional magnetic resonance imaging (fMRI), representations of L1 and L2 have been found in spatially isolated parts of the left inferior frontal cortex of late learners (Broca's area). For early learners, similar parts of Broca's area are activated for both language—whereas later learners have shown to use different parts of Broca's area. In contrast, there is overlap in active regions of L1 and L2 within Wernicke's area, regardless of age of L2 acquisition.

==== Effects of language proficiency on L2 cortical representation ====
Conversely, it has also been reported that there is at times, no difference within the left prefrontal cortex when comparing word generation in early bilinguals and late bilinguals. It has been reported that these findings may conflict with those stated above because of different levels of proficiency in each language. That is, an individual who resides in a bilingual society is more likely to be highly proficient in both languages, as opposed to a bilingual individual who lives in a dominantly monolingual community. Thus, language proficiency is another factor affecting the neuronal organization of language processing in bilinguals.

With the use of positron emission tomography (PET), research has shown that brain regions active during translation are outside classical language areas. Translating from L1 to L2 and vice versa activates the anterior cingulate and bilateral subcortical structures (i.e. putamen and head of caudate nucleus). This pattern is explained in terms of the need for greater coordination of mental operations. More specifically, automated circuits are favoured over cerebral pathways for naming words. Language switching is another task in which brain activation is high in Broca's area and the supramarginal gyrus. This was originally observed by Poetzl, (1925, 1930) and Leischner, (1943)—all of whom reported that patients with supramarginal lesions were defective in switching languages.

Areas of the brain associated with phonological working memory have been shown to have greater activation in bilinguals proficient in both languages using fMRI. Equally proficient bilinguals use working memory more than bilinguals who have unequal proficiency. This suggests that optimal use of phonological working memory, specifically the left insula and left inferior frontal gyrus, is associated with higher second language acquisition.

==== Linguistic fluency ====
Most studies involving neuroimaging investigations of language production in bilinguals employ tasks that require single word processing—predominantly in the form of word generation (fluency) tasks. Fluency tasks show substantial activation of the left dorsolateral frontal cortex. Phonemic verbal fluency (initial letter fluency) activates the left inferior frontal gyrus, and the posterior frontal operculum (Ba 44). Semantic fluency, however, engages discrete activation of anterior frontal regions (Brodmann areas 45 and 46).

Functional neuroimaging research has shown that very early bilinguals display no difference in brain activation for L1 and L2—which is assumed to be due to high proficiency in both languages. Additionally, in highly proficient late bilinguals, there is a common neural network that plays an important role in language production tasks; whereas, in late bilinguals, spatially separated regions are activated in Broca's area for L1 and L2. Finally, it has been found that larger cerebral activation is measured when a language is spoken less fluently than when languages are spoken fluently. Overall, in bilinguals/polyglots, achieved proficiency, and possibly language exposure, are more crucial than age of acquisition in the cerebral representation of languages. However, since age of acquisition has a strong effect on the likelihood of achieving high fluency, these variables are strongly intertwined.

=== Language comprehension in bilinguals ===
Research generally supports the belief that language comprehension in the bilingual brain is malleable. Listening to stories in L1 and L2 results in largely dissimilar patterns of neural activity in low proficiency bilinguals—regardless of age of acquisition. Some researchers propose that the amount to which one masters L2 is accountable for the measured differences between groups of early and late learners. Specifically, in terms of auditory language comprehension for proficient bilinguals who have acquired L2 after ten years of age (late learners), the activated neural areas are similar for both languages. However, as already noted, there are fewer individuals becoming highly proficient at later ages of acquisition.

Language comprehension research on bilinguals used fMRI techniques. Groups of two orthographically and phonologically outlying languages (English and Mandarin) were the basis of analysis. Sentence comprehension was measured through visually presented stimuli, showing significant activation in several key areas: the left inferior and middle frontal gyri, the left superior and middle temporal gyri, the left temporal pole, the anterior supplementary motor area, and bilateral representation of the superior parietal regions and occipital regions. Also, brain activation of these two orthographically and phonologically outlying languages showed striking overlap (i.e. the direct contrast did not indicate significant differences). Single word comprehension using L1 generated greater activation in the temporal pole than comprehension of words in L2. Language comprehension studies of bilinguals using neuroimaging give more conclusive results than production studies.

=== General findings ===
Functional neuroimaging methods such as PET and fMRI are used to study the complex neural mechanisms of the human language systems. Functional neuroimaging is used to determine the most important principles of cerebral language organization in bilingual persons. Based on the evidence we can conclude that the bilingual brain is not the addition of two monolingual language systems, but operates as a complex neural network that can differ across individuals.

The bilingual language system is affected by specific factors of which proficiency appears to be the most important. Evidence, mentioned previously, has shown that differential cerebral activation in anterior brain structures (e.g. Ba and the basal ganglia) is related to poor performance on word generation and production. With regards to language comprehension, differences in levels of language proficiency engage the temporal lobes (particularly the temporal pole). Where in the least proficient language, more cerebral activation is related to speech production, less activation is related to comprehending the least proficient language.

Age of acquisition is not as important in comprehension activities as it is in production activities. However, that is not to say that age of acquisition is not a major factor in the proficiency of L2. In fact studies have determined late learners to be less proficient in L2 than early learners. Functional imaging methods have revealed that holding proficiency constant leads to age of acquisition not having a large influence on representation of L2 in the brain, but there are fewer individuals achieving high proficiency at later ages of acquisition.

== Structural plasticity ==
Second language proficiency and age at acquisition affect grey matter density in the brain. The human ability to learn multiple languages is a skill thought to be mediated by functional (rather than structural) plastic changes in the brain. Learning a second language is said to increase grey matter density in the left inferior parietal cortex, and the amount of structural reorganization in this region is modulated by the proficiency attained and the age at acquisition. It has been suggested that this relation between grey matter density and performance denotes a general principle of brain organization.

There is an increase in grey matter density in the left inferior parietal cortex of bilinguals compared to that in monolinguals. Grey matter density is more prominent in early bilinguals than it is in late bilinguals. Evidence has also shown that density in this region increases with second language proficiency and is negatively correlated with age of acquisition.

It has also been shown that bilingualism affects the white matter of the brain, expressed as increased myelination of a series of white matter tracts, including the corpus callosum, in sequential adult bilinguals that are active users of their second language. It is thought that these effects are due to the cognitively demanding skill of handling more than one languages, which requires more efficient connectivity between areas in the grey matter of the brain. Similar effects have been found in lifelong elderly bilinguals and simultaneous bilingual children.

It is debated whether the above-mentioned effects are the result of a genetic predisposition to increased density, rather than experience-related structural reorganization. A second language is likely acquired through social experience, in early bilinguals, rather than through genetic predisposition. Thus, the research suggests that the structure of the human brain is reworked by the experience of acquiring a second language.

This theory is also consistent with growing evidence that the human brain changes structurally due to environmental demands. For instance, it has been established that structure is altered as a consequence of learning in domains independent of language.

As to structural plasticity induced by bilingualism, it has recently been shown that bilinguals, as compared to monolinguals, have increased grey matter density in the anterior cingulate cortex (ACC). The ACC is a brain structure that helps subjects to monitor their actions and it is part of the attentional and executive control system. Bilinguals have increased grey matter in this brain area because they continuously monitor their languages in order to avoid unwanted language interferences from the language not in use. The continuous use of the ACC in turn induces plastic neural effects. This may be the same reason why bilinguals are faster than monolinguals on many attentional control tasks.

== Bilingual aphasia ==
Bilingual aphasia is a specific form of aphasia which affects one or more languages of a bilingual (or multilingual) individual. As of 2001, 45,000 new cases of bilingual aphasia are predicted annually in the United States. The main factors influencing the outcomes of bilingual aphasia are the number of languages spoken and the order in which they are learned—both influenced by the pattern of daily use and expertise in each language before the onset of aphasia. The type and severity of the aphasia, the location and size of the lesions, as well as the patient's levels of education and literacy also influence the functional outcomes of bilingual aphasia.

=== Lateralization ===
Previously, research has revolved around the hypothesis that language in bilingual individuals is more symmetrically represented in the brain, where the symmetrical representation in the cerebral hemispheres can be attributed to differential localization of the languages. Thus, if one of the languages is heavily represented in the right hemisphere, it can then be partially represented in a different locus, and this has been the explanation to some nonparallel recovery patterns. Based on further studies with communication deficits associated with right hemisphere lesions, it can be safely assumed that the right hemisphere is crucial to processing the pragmatics of using languages. With bilinguals, they are likely to compensate for their gaps in linguistic understandings in their weaker language by increasing reliance on their pragmatics. Therefore, it is highly expect that they will be involving the use of the right hemisphere to allow this process, and thus further supporting the notion of lateralization of multiple languages.

There are two proposed theoretical views generally taken to approach bilingual aphasia. The more traditional Localizationist view, states that the loss of one language occurs because the patient's languages are represented in different brain areas or in different hemispheres. Thus, if one area is damaged, only the language represented there would suffer, and the others would not. The second view is the Dynamic view of selective language recovery, which proposes that the language system of representation and control is compromised as a result of damage. This theory is supported by the functional imaging data of normal bilinguals and holds that fluency in a language is lost because of an increase in the activation threshold. The Dynamic view offers an explanation for selective recovery of language and many reported recovery patterns in bilingual aphasia (See Recovery) There is much debate over which hemisphere supports the languages and which intrahemispheric neural regions represent each language within a bilingual individual. Most neuroimaging studies show no laterality differences between monolingual and bilingual speakers, supporting the hypothesis that languages share some areas of the brain, but also have some separate neural areas. Right hemisphere damage has been shown to result in the same patterns of cognitive-communication deficits in monolinguals and bilinguals; however, bilingual speakers who have left hemisphere damage are shown to be at risk for aphasia while monolingual individuals are not.

=== Bilingual Aphasia Test ===
In the past, the assessment of aphasia in bilinguals or multilinguals was only available in the language of the hospital. This was problematic because the professionals performing these assessments often misjudged the patient's recovery progress in the non native languages of the professional. To solve this issue, The Bilingual Aphasia Test (BAT) was developed by Michel Paradis and associates. The test was developed as an instrument to assess aphasia with more accuracy. The test is available in many different languages and is designed to be equivalent in its content, and not merely translations of each other. Components of linguistic construction of some languages do not directly translate to other languages (i.e. passive in English). Therefore, the tests are designed to be culturally and linguistically equivalent. The goal of the tests is to tap into the same information in different languages with respect to the rationale that motivated the constructions. The BAT consists of 3 major sections, each listed as Part A, Part B, and Part C. Patients are required to take each section accordingly. Part B examines language performance in 4 modalities: hearing, speaking, reading, and writing. At the word, sentence, and paragraph level, the patient is tested on level of linguistic skill (phonological, morphological, syntactic, lexical, semantic). Part C is used to assess the ability of the subject to translate material between given pairs of their known languages. There are currently 65 available languages for Part B and 160 language pairs available for Part C. The specifics and associated cultures of each languages were accounted for and the materials of these sections were adapted accordingly rather than being directly translated. An example follows where, in a Friulian and English pair, the English stimuli included "mat, cat, bat, hat" and the Friulian counterpart (which included 4 words that differed solely by one initial phoneme) was represented as "'cjoc, c¸oc, poc, toc' (drunk, log, chicory, piece)." The response of the patients are recorded and processed with computer programs that indicate the percentage of correct answers for each linguistic skill. Thus, with the BAT, the assessment of bilingual aphasia allows a direct comparison of the knowledge and performance of each of the patient's languages to determine the severity of the aphasia.

=== Recovery ===
The concept of different recovery patterns was first noted by Albert Pitres in 1895. Since then, seven patterns have been outlined, where differential recovery, alternating recovery, alternating antagonistic recovery, and blended recovery were additionally noted by Michel Paradis:

1. Selective recovery – one language remains impaired and the other recovers; the activation threshold for the impaired language is permanently increased
2. Parallel recovery of both languages (i.e., when both impaired languages improve to a similar extent and concurrently);
3. Successive recovery (i.e., when complete recovery of one language precedes the recovery of the other);
4. Differential recovery – occurs when there is greater inhibition of one language than of another
5. Alternating recovery (i.e., the language that was first recovered will be lost again due to the recovery of the language that was not first recovered);
6. Alternating antagonistic recovery – in which the language that was not used for a time becomes the currently used language (i.e., on one day the patient is able to speak in one language while the next day only in the other); and
7. Blended recovery – Pathological mixing of two languages (i.e., the elements of the two languages are involuntarily mixed during language production)

These patterns arise due to the state of the cerebral substrate. Research has proposed that it is not due to the cerebral substrate being physically destroyed, but due to its weakened state that has led to the different forms of inhibition. This weakening of the system has been tied to the idea of increased inhibition, which is when the threshold in activation for that system rises unnaturally due to damage. This leads to languages being inhibited in various was, and thus, resulting in variations in the recovery, and sometimes non-recovery, of the languages.

Research that compares the prevalence of the different recovery patterns generally shows that the most common pattern of recovery is parallel recovery, followed by differential, blended, selective, and successive. In regards to differential recovery, better recovery of L1 is shown to be slightly more common than better recovery of L2.

In 1977, it was proposed that when the effects of age, proficiency, context of acquisition, and type of bilingualism are combined, the recovery pattern of a bilingual aphasic can be properly predicted. It has recently been reported that language status (how frequently the language is used in comparison to other languages), lesion type or site, the context in which the languages were used, the type of aphasia, and the manner in which the language could not reliably predict recovery patterns.

In comparison to monolinguals, bilinguals have shown to have a better recovery after stroke. As with Alzheimer's patients, bilingual patients who have suffered an ischemic stroke have shown to have a better cognitive outcome which researchers believe is due to a higher cognitive reserve. This increase of cognitive reserve might be attributed to the increase of grey matter in bilingual individuals. Since bilingual individuals have to constantly change and inhibit a language, the brain is more used to brain training and has been able to optimize better the space it uses. Brain training has led researchers to believe is a factor that helps stroke patients recover faster and better. Bilingual individuals then are able to benefit more from rehabilitation after stroke compared to monolingual patients because the brain has a higher plasticity ability that allows for a better remodeling of the brain after stroke. Stroke patients (bilinguals) with aphasia also perform better in other cognitive tasks that measure attention and ability to organize and retrieve information. This is attributed again to the increase of grey matter since it is involved in cognitive control and higher cognitive functions that are more present in bilinguals. This is relevant since in some patients the automatization of language is impaired, highly correlated to basal ganglia lesions and anterior parietal cortex. Although it is uncommon for patients to lose automatization of the first language, basal ganglia lesions have been correlated to loss of automatization of language, which fits with the role of basal ganglia in automatized motor and cognitive performance. This is more evident with patients who have acquired a second language at a later age since studies suggest that late bilingual aphasics' syntactic judgment abilities may be more impaired for the second language. Acquisition of language at a later age changes the mapping of language in the brain since the languages do not overlap. This difference in mapping seems to be a contributing factor in recovery for patients with bilingual aphasia since there are second language-restricted zones that are dedicated to the first language.

Nonetheless, age of acquisition also shows to be a factor in the degree of recovery of stroke patients due to differences in language mapping and the amount of grey matter developed. Studies have shown stroke patients are able to benefit more from rehabilitation and recover faster if they have acquired a new skill that requires high cognitive ability due to more extensive brain training. This is true also for patients who have acquired a new skill at a later age. Nonetheless, stroke patients who have acquired a skill (second language in this case) early on have a higher chance of recovery than those who acquired i.e. language later on. This is again attributed to the higher grey matter area that those with early acquisition have developed.

== The bimodal bilingual brain ==
Bimodal bilinguals are individuals who are fluent in both sign language and oral language. The effect of this language experience on the brain compared to brain regions in monolinguals or bilinguals of oral languages has only recently become a research interest, but is now used to provide insight on syntactic integration and language control of bilinguals. PET scans of a 37-year-old, right handed, bilingual (English and American Sign Language) male with left frontal lobe damage revealed evidence of increased right hemisphere activity compared to normal controls during spontaneous generation of narrative in both English and American Sign Language (ASL). Research with fMRI has found that showing sign language to deaf and hearing signers and showing written English to hearing non-signers activates the classical language areas of the left hemisphere in both cases. Studies in this area generally compare the behaviour or brain activity in normally hearing monolingual speakers of an oral language, genetically deaf, native signers, and normally hearing bimodal bilinguals. With the use of functional Near-Infrared Imaging (fNIR), Kovelman (2009) compared the performance and brain activity of these three groups in picture-naming tasks. These researchers found that, although performance in all groups was similar, neuroimaging revealed that bilinguals showed greater signal intensity within the posterior temporal regions (Wernicke's area) while using both languages in rapid alternation than when they were only using one language.

=== Working memory ===
PET studies have revealed a language modality-specific working memory neural region for sign language (which relies on a network of bilateral temporal, bilateral parietal, and left premotor activation), as well as a difference in activation of the right cerebellum in bimodal bilinguals between when they are signing or speaking. Similarities of activation have been found in Broca's area and semantic retrieval causes similar patterns of activation in the anterior left inferior frontal lobe. The bilateral parietal activation pattern for sign language is similar to neural activity during nonverbal visuospatial tasks.

=== Face recognition ===
Sign language and oral language experience in bimodal bilinguals are shown to have separate effects on activation patterns within the superior temporal sulcus when recognizing facial expressions. The superior temporal sulcus, located in the temporal lobe of the brain, serves a variety of social processes. Some of these social processes include language perception or the ability to mimick the mental progressions of others (theory of mind). An fMRI study conducted by Deen B, Koldewyn K, Kanwisher N, Sax R concluded that the first cognitive function attributed to the superior temporal sulcus was language comprehension. Additionally, hearing signers (individuals who can hear and also speak sign language) do not show the strong left-lateralized activation for facial expression recognition that has been found within deaf signers. A potential reason for this is most facial processing studies done on humans show a stronger stimulation in the right hemisphere than when compared to the left. This indicates that both sign language experience and deafness can affect the neural organization for recognizing facial expressions.

== See also ==
- Second-language acquisition
