= Johanna (East Indiaman) =

British merchant sailing ship wrecked on the South African coast

Coordinates: 34°46′58″S 19°40′46″E

History

United Kingdom
- Name: Johanna
- Namesake: Anjouan
- Fate: Wrecked 8 June 1682

General characteristics
- Tons burthen: 515, or 600 (bm)
- Complement: 110
- Armament: 36

Western Cape, South Africa

Johanna (or Joanna) was an East Indiaman for the British East India Company (EIC), possibly named for the island of Anjouan, then known as Johanna. She made five voyages for the EIC between c. 1671 and 1681, On her sixth voyage she became the first Indiaman lost on the South African coast when she wrecked on 8 June 1682.

== Career ==
Captain Hopefar Bendall was her captain for the first five, successful voyages.

Voyage #1 - Madras and Bengal; 1671/2 season.
Voyage #2 - St Helena and Bantam; 9 May 1674 – 30 June 1675.
Voyage #3 - Madras and Bengal; 8 January 1676 – 13 August 1677.
Voyage #4 - St Helena and Bantam; departed 27 Mar 1678.
Voyage #5 - Surat; returned 16 Jul 1681.

== Loss ==
For her sixth voyage, Johanna was under the command of Captain Robert Brown. She left the Downs on 24 February 1682, and wrecked near the Cape Agulhas on 8 June 1682, while in a convoy to India with four other ships. Ten persons lost their lives, while the remaining 104 were able to make their way to Cape Town.

== Post-script ==
A considerable amount of gold was on board. Dutch East India Company Governor of the Cape Simon van der Stel immediately despatched a recovery expedition led by Olof Bergh that recovered some of it. Three hundred years later, in 1982, treasure hunters salvaged a further 23,000 coins and several hundred kilograms of silver.

== See also ==
- Arniston, another East Indiaman wrecked near Cape Agulhas
