= Juan =

- Pronunciation: Manx: [ˈdʒuːʌn] Portuguese: [ʁuˈɐ̃] Spanish: [xwan]
- Gender: Male

Other gender
- Feminine: Juana (Spanish)

Origin
- Origin: Spanish derivation of John or Manx derivation of John
- Meaning: "Yahweh has been Gracious", "Graced by Yahweh" (Johanan)
- Region of origin: Spain/Philippines/Latin America/Isle of Man

Other names
- Pet name: Juanito (Spanish)
- Related names: John, Euan, Evan, Giovanni, Hans, Hovhannes, Ian, Ioan, Ioane, Ivan, Iban, Ioannis, Iven, Ifan, Jack, Jackson, Jan, Jane, Janez, Jean, Joan, João, Johan/Johann, Johanan, Johannes, Jon, Jonne, Jovan, Juhani, Seán, Shane, Siôn, Yahya, Yohannes

Juan is a given name, the Spanish and Manx versions of John. The name is of Hebrew origin and has the meaning "God has been gracious." It is very common in Spain and in other Spanish-speaking countries around the world and in the Philippines, and also in the Isle of Man (pronounced differently). The name is popular around the world and can be pronounced differently according the region. In Spanish, the diminutive form (equivalent to Johnny) is Juanito, with feminine form (comparable to Jane, Joan, or Joanna) Juana, and feminine diminutive Juanita (equivalent to Janet, Janey, Joanie, etc.).

== Chinese terms ==
- Juan (Mandarin pronunciation: [tɕɥɛ̂n] or [tɕɥɛ́n] 娟, 隽) 'beautiful, graceful' is a common given name for Chinese women.
- Juan ([tɕɥɛ̀n]) The Chinese character 卷, which in Mandarin is almost homophonic with the characters for the female name, is a division of a traditional Chinese book and can be translated as 'fascicle', 'scroll', 'chapter', or 'volume'.

== Notable people ==
- Juan (footballer, born 1979), Brazilian footballer
- Juan (footballer, born 1982), Brazilian footballer
- Juan (footballer, born March 2002), Brazilian footballer
- Juan (footballer, born April 2002), Brazilian footballer
- Juan Acevedo, Mexican baseball pitcher
- Juan Agosto (born 1958), Puerto Rican baseball player
- Juan de Agramonte (fl. 1511), Catalonian explorer
- Juan Alberto Belloch, Spanish politician and mayor of Zaragoza
- Juan Almeida Bosque, Cuban politician and one of the original commanders of the Cuban Revolution
- Juan Andrés Gelly (1790–1856), Paraguayan diplomat and lawyer
- Juan Andrés y Morell, Spanish writer and historian
- Juan Antonio Jara (1845–1887), Paraguayan politician
- Juan Nekai Babauta, former governor of the Northern Mariana Islands
- Juan Betances (born 1983), Dominican Republic sprinter
- Juan Borges Mateos (born 1966), Cuban chess player
- Juan Bosch, first 'cleanly' elected president of Dominican Republic
- Juan Brito, multiple people
- Juan Caguaripano, Venezuelan military officer and torture victim
- Juan Carlos I of Spain, King of Spain 1975–2014
- Juan Carlos Onetti, Uruguayan author
- Juan Castro, Mexican baseball infielder
- Juan Cervantes, multiple people
- Juan Chioran, Argentine-Canadian actor
- Juan de la Concha Castañeda (1818–1903), Spanish lawyer and politician
- Juan Corona (1934–2019), Mexican serial killer
- Juan Crisóstomo Centurión (1840–1902), Paraguayan military officer
- Juan Cruz (born 1978), Dominican baseball pitcher
- Juan Cruz (born 1966), Spanish screenwriter and film director
- Juan Aubín Cruz Manzano (born 1948), Puerto Rican politician and mayor of Manatí since 1977
- Juan R. Cruz (born 1946), Puerto Rican aerospace engineer at NASA
- Juan de la Cierva, Spanish civil engineer and pilot, inventor of the autogyro
- Juan Debiedma, American computer game player
- Juan Diego (name), Multiple people
- Juan Domínguez, Colombian footballer
- Juan Domínguez, Dominican baseball player
- Juan Domínguez Lamas, Spanish footballer
- Juan Domínguez Otaegui, Spanish footballer
- Juan Catalino Domínguez (1910–1948), Argentine serial killer
- Juan Domínguez, Spanish road racing cyclist
- Juan Domingo Perón, Argentine general and politician
- Juan Encarnación, Dominican baseball player
- Juan Manuel Eguiagaray, Spanish politician and academic
- Juan Ponce Enrile, President of the Philippine Senate 2008–2013
- Juan Esteban Fagetti (1888–1954), Uruguayan writer and poet
- Juan Fontena, Chilean basketball player
- Juan Gabriel, Mexican singer and songwriter
- Juan González, Puerto Rican baseball player
- Juan Gris, Spanish painter
- Juan Fernando Hermosa (1976–1996), Ecuadorian teenage serial killer
- Juan Ignacio Cirac Sasturain, Spanish physicist
- Juan Karlos Labajo, Filipino singer-songwriter
- Juan Jesus, Brazilian footballer
- Juan Joya Borja, Spanish Comedian and Internet meme
- Juan Leal, First Mayor of San Antonio, Texas
- Juan Antonio Llorente, 18th-century historian
- Juan Luis Vives, Spanish scholar and humanist
- Juan Luis Arsuaga, Spanish paleontologist
- Juan Ramón Jiménez, Spanish poet who received the Nobel Prize in Literature in 1956
- Juan Manuel, Prince of Villena, Spanish medieval writer
- Juan Manuel Blanes, Uruguayan painter
- Juan Manuel Fangio, Argentine racing driver
- Juan Manuel Santos, Colombian President
- Juan Marichal, Dominican baseball player
- Juan Martín del Potro, Argentine tennis player
- Juan Mata, Spanish footballer who plays for English club Manchester United
- Juan Mateo, Dominican baseball player
- Juan López Mella (1965–1995), Spanish motorcycle racer
- Juan Miro, Catalan painter
- Juan Morillo (born 1972), Venezuelan sprinter
- Juan Morillo (born 1983), Dominican baseball pitcher
- Juan Pablo Montoya Roldán, Colombian racing driver
- Juan Nicasio, Dominican baseball player
- Juan Padilla, Puerto Rican baseball pitcher
- Juan Padilla, Cuban baseball second baseman
- Juan Paiva (born 1998), Brazilian actor
- Juan Pérez (born 1978), Dominican baseball pitcher
- Juan Pérez (born 1986), Dominican baseball outfielder
- Juan Pérez (died before 1513), Spanish Franciscan and companion of Christopher Columbus
- Juan Pérez (born 1956), American municipal politician and lawyer
- Juan Pérez (born 1985), Mexican football player
- Juan Pérez (born 1974), Spanish Olympic handball player
- Juan Pérez Alsina, Argentine politician
- Juan Pérez de Gijón (fl. 1460–1500), Spanish composer of the Renaissance
- Juan Pérez de Montalbán (1602–1638), Spanish dramatist, poet and novelist
- Juan Pérez de la Serna (1573–1631), seventh Archbishop of Mexico
- Juan Pérez de Zurita (1516–c. 1595), Spanish conquistador
- Juan José Pérez Hernández (c. 1725–1775), Spanish explorer
- Juan Pérez (1932–?), Chilean Olympic cyclist
- Juan Carlos Pérez (footballer) (born 1972), Ecuadorian footballer
- Juan Carlos Pérez (sport shooter) (born 1981), Bolivian trap shooter
- Juan de Dios Pérez (born 1980), Panamanian footballer
- Juan Manuel Pérez (born 1993), Argentine footballer
- Juan David Pérez (born 1991), Colombian footballer
- Juan Pérez Medina (born 1960), Mexican politician and educator
- Juan Perón, President of Argentina
- Juan Pierre, American baseball player
- Juan Pizarro Navarrete, Spanish physician and politician
- Juan Ponce de León, Spanish explorer
- Juan Rincón, Venezuelan baseball pitcher
- Juan Rivera (fl. 1765), Spanish explorer of North America
- Juan Rivera (born 1978), Venezuelan baseball outfielder
- Juan Rivera (born 1972), American wrongfully convicted three times of a rape and murder
- Juan Rivera, American singer and actor
- Juan Rojas (died 1578), Catholic prelate
- Juan Roman Riquelme, Argentine footballer
- Juan Rosai (1940–2020), Italian-American pathologist
- Juan Rulfo (1917–1986), Mexican author
- Juan Sebastián Elcano, Spanish explorer
- Juan Sebastián Verón, Argentine footballer
- Juan Pablo Sorín (born 1976), Argentine footballer
- Juan Soto (born 1998), Dominican baseball player
- Juan Then (born 2000), Dominican baseball player
- Juan Thornhill (born 1996), American football player
- Juan Toscano, Mexican basketball player
- Juan Trippe, founder of Pan American World Airways
- Juan Uder (1927–2020), Argentine basketball player
- Juan Uribe, Dominican baseball infielder
- Juan Valdez, colonial governor of Texas
- Juan el de la Vara (born 1938), Spanish flamenco singer
- Juan Vargas Aruquipa (born 1947), Bolivian Roman Catholic bishop
- Juan Vasquez (disambiguation), several people
- Juan de Yepes Álvarez, Spanish poet and Catholic Saint (Saint John of the Cross)
- Juan Zumel, 16th-century Castilian magistrate
- Juan José Zúñiga, bolivian General convicted in 2024 for the 2024 Bolivian coup attempt

=== Manx people with the name ===
- Juan Noa, poet
- Juan Turner, politician, businessman, and media personality
- Juan Watterson, politician

== Fictional characters ==
- Juan Cabrillo, the main character of the book series Oregon Files
- Juan Carlos "Juice" Ortiz, a character of the Sons of Anarchy television series
- Juan Sánchez Villa-Lobos Ramírez, a character from the Highlander film series
- Juan Tamad, a character in Philippine folklore
- Juan Valdez a coffee branding character
- Juan Cortez, a character in Grand Theft Auto: Vice City

== See also ==
- Alternate forms for the name John
- Don Juan (disambiguation)
- João, the corresponding Portuguese name
- Joan (first name), the corresponding Catalan name
- Jean (male given name), the corresponding French name
- John (given name), the corresponding English name
- San Juan (disambiguation)
- Jwan (disambiguation)
- Juwan (disambiguation)
