= Madrid (disambiguation) =

Madrid is the capital of Spain.

It can also refer to:

== Other places ==
=== Spain ===
- Community of Madrid, an autonomous community of Spain
- Madrid (Spanish Congress Electoral District), a Spanish Parliament constituency

=== Colombia ===
- Madrid, Colombia

=== Mexico ===
- Madrid, Colima

=== Philippines ===
- Madrid, Surigao del Sur, a municipality

=== United States ===
- Madrid, Alabama
- Madrid, Colorado
- Madrid, Iowa
- Madrid, Maine
- Madrid, Nebraska
- Madrid, New Mexico
- Madrid, New York
  - Madrid (CDP), New York

== People ==
- Andrés Madrid (born 1981), Argentine footballer
- Bartolomé Madrid Olmo (born 1964), Spanish politician
- José Fernández Madrid (1789–1830), politician, physician, scientist and writer closely associated with the United Provinces of New Grenada
- Juan Madrid (born 1947), Spanish writer
- Miguel de la Madrid (1934–2012), President of Mexico (1982–88)
- Patricia Madrid (born 1947), New Mexico Attorney General and congressional candidate
- Rere Madrid (born 2001), Filipina actress and model
- Ruru Madrid (born 1997), Filipino actor

== Other uses ==
- The Madrid system for the international registration of trademarks
- 14967 Madrid, an asteroid
- Madrid (crater), crater on Mars
- Madrid, 1987, a Spanish drama film directed by David Trueba
- Madrid (band)
- Real Madrid C.F., a football team based in Madrid, Spain
- Atlético de Madrid, better known as Atlético Madrid, a football team based in Madrid, Spain

== See also ==
- New Madrid (disambiguation)
- Madriz (disambiguation), a Spanish surname and Nicaraguan place name
- Madridejos (disambiguation), a Spanish and Philippines place name
