= Juan (disambiguation) =

Juan is a given name in Spanish, Manx, and Chinese.

Juan may also refer to:

- Juan (surname), also transliterated Ruan
- Any of several storms named Juan
- Juan station, a subway station in Incheon, South Korea

== See also ==
- Juanita (disambiguation)
- Don Juan (disambiguation)
- San Juan (disambiguation)
- Jwan (disambiguation)
- Juwan (disambiguation)
