= Iban =

IBAN, Iban or Ibán may refer to:

== Banking ==
- International Bank Account Number

== Ethnology ==
- Iban culture
- Iban language
- Iban people

== People with the given name ==
=== Sportspeople ===
- Ibán Espadas (born 1978), Spanish footballer
- Iban Etcheverry (born 1998), French rugby union player
- Iban Fagoaga (born 1980), Spanish football manager and former player
- Iban Iriondo (born 1984), Spanish road bicycle racer
- Iban Iyanga (born 1987), Spanish footballer for Equatorial Guinea
- Iban Mayo (born 1977), Spanish road bicycle racer
- Iban Mayoz (born 1981), Spanish road bicycle racer
- Ibán Parra (born 1977), Spanish footballer
- Ibán Pérez (born 1983). Spanish volleyball player
- Iban Salvador, playing name of Equatoguinean footballer Iván Salvador (born 1995)
- Iban Zubiaurre (born 1983), Spanish footballer

=== Other professions ===
- Iban García del Blanco (born 1977), Spanish politician, Member of the European Parliament
- Iban von Bernstein, 14th-century Hungarian-born Austrian nobleman

== See also ==
- Ban number
