= Juan Cervantes =

Juan Cervantes may refer to:

- Juan de Cervantes (c. 1380/1382 –1453), cardinal of the Roman Catholic Church
- Juan de Cervantes (bishop) (1553–1614), Roman Catholic bishop
- Juan Pablo Cervantes García (born 1992), Mexican paralympic athlete
- Juan Cervantes, the Spanish student in the British comedy series Mind Your Language, played by Ricardo Montez

== See also ==
- Juan de los Santos Madriz y Cervantes (1785–1852), Costa Rican politician, priest and educator
