= Madriz =

Madriz may refer to:

== People ==
- Abraham Madriz (born 2004), Costa Rican footballer
- Emiliano Madriz (c. 1800 – 1845), former Supreme Director of Nicaragua
- Francisco Javier Díaz Madriz, Director General of the National Police of Nicaragua
- Jhannett Madriz, Venezuelan politician and judge
- José Madriz (1867–1911), former President of Nicaragua
- José María Castro Madriz (1818–1892), Costa Rican lawyer, academic, diplomat and politician
- Juan de los Santos Madriz y Cervantes (1785–1852), Costa Rican priest, educator and politician

== Places ==
- Eye spelling of Madrid, Spain, based on a local accent (i.e. [maˈðɾiθ])
- Madriz Department, Nicaragua, named after José
- Berceo, Spain, a village known as Madriz in the Middle Ages
