= Juan Vasquez =

Juan Vásquez or Vasquez, may refer to:

- Juan Vásquez (composer) (c. 1500–c.1560), Spanish priest and composer of the renaissance
- Juan Materno Vásquez de León (1927–1999), Panamanian lawyer
- Juan F. Vasquez (born 1948), Judge of the United States Tax Court
- Juan David Ochoa Vásquez (c. 1949–2013), Colombian drug dealer
- Juan Esteban Aristizábal Vásquez (born 1972), Colombian rock musician; his legal name is correctly shortened as Juan Aristizábal
- Juan Gabriel Vásquez (born 1973), Colombian writer
- Juan Carlos Vásquez (born 1986), Colombian composer and sound artist

== See also ==
- Juan Vazquez (disambiguation)
