= Juan Vazquez =

Juan Vázquez may refer to:

- Juan Vázquez de Molina (1510–1570), Secretary of State to Charles V and Philip II.
- Juan Bautista Vázquez (1510–1588), Spanish sculptor and painter of the Renaissance period
- Juan Vázquez de Mella (1861–1928), Spanish politician known for his rhetorical power
- Juan T. Vázquez Martín (1941–2017), Cuban abstract painter who lived and worked in Havana
- Juan Vázquez de Coronado (1523–1565), Spanish conquistador and first Governor of Costa Rica
- Juan Vásquez (composer) (c. 1500–c. 1560), Spanish composer, surname also spelled Vázquez
- Juan Vázquez Terreiro (1912–1957), Spanish international footballer
- Juan Vázquez García (born 1952), Spanish economist

== See also ==
- Juan Vasquez (disambiguation)
