= Iban culture =

Culture of Dayak people in Southeast Asia

The Ibans or Sea Dayaks are a branch of the Dayak people on the island of Borneo in Southeast Asia. It is believed that the term "Iban" was originally from the Kayan language. "Iban" or "Hivan" means human or person.

Ibans were renowned for practicing headhunting and tribal/territorial expansion, and had a fearsome reputation as a strong and successful warring tribe in the past. Since the arrival of Europeans and the subsequent colonisation of the area, headhunting gradually faded out of practice although many other tribal customs and practices as well as the Iban language continue to thrive. The Iban population is concentrated in Brunei, the Indonesian province of West Kalimantan and the Malaysian state of Sarawak. They traditionally live in longhouses called rumah panjai in Sarawak or betang (trunk) in West Kalimantan, because the jointed family rooms are built by jointing the tree trunks from base to tip to the left and right of the middle headman's room, which symbolizes a tree with a branch on the left and right side.

== Religion and belief ==
Religions of Ibans (Malaysia only)
Religion	Percent
Christianity	76.3%
Folk religion-Animist	13.63%
Islam	1.54%
Other religions	1.35%
No religion / Unknown	5.91%

For hundreds of years, the ancestors of the Iban practiced animistic beliefs, although after the arrival of James Brooke, many were influenced by European missionaries and converted to Christianity. Although the majority are now Christian; many continue to observe both Christian and traditional ceremonies, particularly during marriages or festivals, although some ancestral practice such as miring are still prohibited by certain churches. After being Christianized, the majority of Iban people have changed their traditional name to a Hebrew-based "Christian name" such as David, Christopher, Janet, Magdalene, Peter or Joseph, but a minority still maintain their traditional Iban name or a combination of both with the first Christian name followed by a second traditional Iban name such as David Dunggau, Kenneth Kanang, Christopher Changgai, Janet Jenna or Joseph Jelenggai.

The longhouses of Iban Dayaks are constructed in such a way as to act as an accommodation and a religious place of worship. The entire structure is built as a standing tree when viewed along its length or sideways. The open veranda (tanju) is exposed to sunrise (Mata Ari tumboh), thus facing to the east and the sunset (Mata Ari padam) is the back of the longhouse. The first pillar to be erected during the longhouse construction is the tiang pemun (the main post) from which the pun ramu (the bottom of any tree trunks) is started and followed along the longhouse construction. Any subsequent rituals will refer to the tiang pemun and pun ramu.

=== Iban religion and pantheon ===
Among Iban Dayaks, their belief and way of life can be simply called the Iban religion (pengarap asal) as per Jenson's book with the same title and has been written by Benedict Sandin and others extensively. It is characterized by a supreme being in the name of Bunsu (Kree) Petara who has no parents and creates everything in this world and other worlds. Under Bunsu Petara are the seven gods whose names are: Sengalang Burong as the god of war and healing, Biku Bunsu Petara as the high priest and second in command, Menjaya as the first shaman (manang) and god of medicine, Selampandai as the god of creation, Sempulang Gana as the god of agriculture and land along with Semarugah, Ini Inda/Inee/Andan as the naturally born doctor and god of justice and Anda Mara as the god of wealth.

The life actions and decision-making processes of Iban Dayaks depend on divination, augury, and omens. They have several methods to receive omens where omens can be obtained by deliberate seeking or chance encounters. The first method is via dream to receive charms, amulets (pengaroh, empelias, engkerabun or medicine (obat) and a curse (sumpah) from any gods, people of Panggau Libau and Gelong, and any spirits or ghosts. The second method is via animal omens (burong laba) which have long-lasting effects such as from deer barking which is quite random in nature. The third method is via bird omens (burong bisa) which have short-term effects that are commonly limited to a certain farming year or a certain activity at hand. The fourth method is via pig liver divination after festival celebration At the end of critical festivals, the divination of the pig liver will be interpreted to forecast the outcome of the future or the luck of the individual who holds the festival. The fifth but not the least method is via nampok or betapa (self-imposed isolation) to receive amulet, curse, medicine, or healing.

There are seven omen birds under the charge of their chief Sengalang Burong at their longhouse named Tansang Kenyalang (Hornbill Abode), which are Ketupong (Jaloh or Kikeh or Entis) (Rufous Piculet) as the first in command, Beragai (Scarlet-rumped trogon), Pangkas (Maroon Woodpecker) on the righthand side of Sengalang Burong's family room while Bejampong (Crested Jay) as the second in command, Embuas (Banded Kingfisher), Kelabu Papau (Senabong) (Diard's Trogon) and Nendak (White-rumped shama) on the lefthand side. The calls and flights of the omen birds along with the circumstances and social status of the listeners are considered during the omen interpretations.

The praying and propitiation to certain gods to obtain good omens which indicate God's favour and blessings are held in a series of three-tiered classes of minor ceremonies (bedara), intermediate rites (gawa or nimang), and major festivals (gawai) in ascending order and complexity. Any Iban Dayak will undergo some forms of simple rituals and several elaborate festivals as necessary in their lifetime from a baby, adolescent to adulthood until death. The longhouse where the Iban Dayaks stay is constructed in a unique way to function for both living or accommodation purposes and ritual or religious practices. Nearby the longhouse, there is normally a small and simple hut called langkau ampun/sukor (forgiveness/thanksgiving hut) built to place offerings to deities. Sometimes, when potentially bad omens are encountered, a small hut is quickly built and a fire is started before saying prayers to seek good outcomes.

Common among all these propitiations is that prayers to gods and/or other spirits are made by giving offerings ("piring"), certain poetic leka main and animal sacrifices ("genselan") either chickens or pigs. The number (leka or turun) of each piring offering item is based on ascending odd numbers which have meanings and purposes as below:

- piring 1 for piring jari (feeding)
- piring 3 for piring ampun (mercy) or seluwak (wastefulness spirit)
- piring 5 for piring minta (request) or bejalai (journey)
- piring 7 for piring gawai (festival) or bujang berani (brave warrior)
- piring 9 for sangkong (including others) or turu (leftover included)

Piring contains an offering of various traditional foods and drinks while genselan is made by sacrificing chickens for bird omens or pigs for animal omens.

Bedara is commonly held for any general purposes before holding any rites or festivals during which a simple miring ceremony is done to prepare and divide piring offerings into certain portions followed by a sampi ngau bebiau (prayer and cleansing) poetic speeches. These simple ceremonies have categories such as bedara matak held at the longhouse family bilek room, bedara mansau performed at the family ruai gallery, berunsur (cleansing) carried out at the tanju and river, minta ujan tauka panas (request for rain or sunniness).

The intermediate and medium-sized propitiatory rites are known as gawa (ritually working) with its main highlight called nimang (poetic incantation) that is recited by lemambang bards besides miring ceremonies. This category is smaller than or sometimes relegated from the full-scaled and thus costly festivals for cost savings but still maintaining the effectiveness to achieve the same purpose. Included in this category are "sandau ari" (mid-day ritual) held at the tanju verandah, gawai matak (unripe feast), gawa nimang tuah (luck feast), enchaboh arong (head feast), and gawa timang beintu-intu (life caring feasts.

The major festivals comprise at least seventh categories which are related to major aspects of Iban's traditional way of life i.e. agriculture, headhunting, fortune, health, death, procreation, and weaving.

With paddy being the major sustenance of life among Dayaks, so the first major category comprises the agricultural-related festivals which are dedicated to paddy farming to honour Sempulang Gana who is the deity of agriculture. It is a series of festivals that include Gawai Batu (Whetstone Festival), Gawai Ngalihka Tanah (Soil Ploughing Festival), Gawai Benih (Seed Festival), Gawai Ngemali Umai (Farm Healing Festival), Gawai Matah (Harvest Initiation Festival), and Gawai Basimpan (Paddy Storing Festival). According to Derek Freeman, there are 27 steps of hill paddy farming. One common ritual activity is called "mudas" (making good) any omens found during any farming stages, especially the early bush clearing stage.

The second category includes the headhunting-related festivals to honour the most powerful deity of war, Sengalang Burong that comprises Gawai Burong (Bird Festival) and Gawai Amat/Asal (Real/Original Festival) with their successive ascending stages with the most famous one being Gawai Kenyalang (Hornbill Festival). This is perhaps the most elaborate and complex festival which can last into seven successive days of ritual incantation by lemambang bards. It is held normally after instructed by spirits in dreams. It is performed by tuai kayau (raid leader) called bujang berani (leading warriors) and war leader (tuai serang) who are known as "raja berani" (bravery king). In the past, this festival is vital to seek divine intervention to defeat enemies such as Baketan, Ukit, and Kayan during migrations into new territories.

With the suppression of headhunting, the next important and third category relates to the death-related rituals among which the biggest celebration is the Soul Festival (Gawai Antu) to honour the souls of the dead especially the famous and brave ones who are invited to visit the living for the Sebayan (Haedes) to feast and to bestow all sorts of helpful charms to the living relatives. The raja berani (brave king) can be honoured by his descendants up to three times via Gawai Antu. Other mortuary ceremonies are beserara bungai (flower separation) held three days after burial, ngetas ulit (mourning termination), berantu (Gawai Antu), or gawai ngelumbong (entombing festival).

The fourth category in term of complexity and importance is the fortune-related festivals which consist of Gawai Pangkong Tiang (Post Banging Festival) after transferring to a new longhouse, Gawai Tuah (Luck Festival) with three ascending stages to seek and to welcome lucks, and Gawai Tajau (Jar Festival) to welcome newly acquired jars.

The fifth category consists of the health-related festivals to request for curing of sickness by Menjaya or Ini Andan such as in Gawai Sakit (Sickness Festival) which is held after other smaller attempts have failed to cure the sicked persons such as begama (touching), belian (various manang rituals), Besugi Sakit (to ask Keling for curing via magical power) and Berenong Sakit (to ask for curing by Sengalang Burong) in the ascending order. Manang is consecrated via an official ceremony called Gawai Babangun (Manang Consecration Festival). The shaman (manang) of the Iban Dayaks have various types of pelian (ritual healing ceremony) to be held in accordance with the types of sickness determined by him through his glassy stone to see the whereabouts of the soul of the sick person. Besides, Gawai Burung can also be used for healing certain difficult-to-cure sickness via magical power by Sengalang Burong especially nowadays after headhunting has been stopped. Other self-caring ritual ceremonies that are related to wellness and longevity are nimang bulu (hair adding ceremony), nimang sukat (destiny ceremony), and nimang buloh ayu (life-bamboo ceremony).

The sixth category of festivals pertains to procreation. Gawai Lelabi (River Turtle Festival) is held to pray to the deity of creation called Selampadani, to announce the readiness of daughters for marriage and to solicit a suitable suitor. This is where those men with trophy head skulls become leading contenders. The wedding ceremony is called Melah Pinang (Areca nut Splitting). The god of creation Selampandai is invoked here for the fertility of the daughters to bear many children. There is a series of ritual rites from birth to adolescence of children.

The last and seventh category is Gawai Ngar (Cotton-Dyeing Festival) which is held by women who are involved in weaving pua kumbu for conventional use and ritual purposes. Ritual textiles woven by Iban women are used in the Bird Festival and in the past used to receive trophy heads. The ritual textiles have specific engkeramba (anthropomorphic) motifs that represent igi balang (trophy head), tiang ranyai (shrine pole), cultural heroes of Panggau and Gelong, deities, and antu gerasi (demon figure).

The Iban religion involves worshiping and honouring at least four categories of beings, i.e. Bunsu Petara (the supreme god), and his seven deities (the divine people of Tansang Kenyalang), the holy spirits of Orang Panggau Libau and Gelong, the ghost spirits (Bunsu Antu) and the souls of dead ancestors.

The domains of these beings are as follows:

- from the sky (ari langit) which refers to gods living in the sky i.e. Sengalang Burung, Ini Andan, Seragindit, Bunsu Bintang Banyak, Bunsu Bintang Tiga, Bunsu Bintang Tujuh, Bunsu Bulan and Bunsu Guntur.
- from the tree top (ari pucuk kayu) which refers to omen birds i.e. Ketupung, Beragai, Bejampung, Pangkas, Embuas, Papau and Nendak
- from the land (ari tanah) which refers to augury animals, snakes, reptiles and insects i.e. Simpulang Gana, Selempandai, Seragindah and People of Panggau Libau and Gelung Batu Nakung
- from the water (ari ai) which refers to fishes and water creatures i.e. Seragindi, Bunsu Ikan, Bunsu Tekuyung, Bunsu Lelabi, Bunsu Gerama and Bunsu Baya
- from the sea (ari tasek) such as Ribai and his group
- from the forest (ari kampong baong) notably antu grasi (huntsman demons)
- from the tree branch (ari dan pun kayu) i.e. bujang inin (leopard cat)
- from the cave (ari lubang batu) i.e. bujang lembau (remaong tiger)
- from the under world (sebayan) i.e. Raja Niram and his kingdom of the dead

The supreme God is called Bunsu (Kree) Petara, and is sometimes called Raja Entala or even Tuhan Allah Taala (Arabic defines the article al- "the" and ilāh "deity, god" to al-lāh meaning "the [sole] deity, God") in modern times. The Iban calls this supreme god who creates the universe by the three names of Seragindi which makes the water (ngaga ai), Seragindah which makes the land (ngaga tanah) and Seragindit which makes the sky (ngaga langit).

There are seven deities or demi-gods or regents of the Iban who act as the messengers between human beings and God. These deities are the children of Raja Jembu and the grandchildren of Raja Durong who originated from Sumatra. Their names are as follows:

- Sengalang Burong the god of war
- Biku Bunsu Petara (female) the high priest
- Sempulang Gana the god of agriculture along with his father-in-law Semarugah as the god of land
- Selempandai/Selempeta/Selempetoh the god of creation and procreation.
- Menjaya Manang the god of health and shamanism being the first manang bali
- Anda Mara the god of wealth and fortune.
- Ini Andan/Inee (female) the natural-born doctor and the god of justice

In addition to these gods, there are mystical people namely the orang Panggau Libau and Gelong who hailed from Java, with the most notable ones being Keling and Laja with their respective wives, Kumang and Lulong who often help the Iban Dayaks to be successful in life and adventures.

There are splinter groups from the People of Tansang Kenyalang, People of Panggau and Gelong and the Iban Bejie group which are the Nising group who run away to the upper sky, Ribai group to the land across the sea and the antu grasi group who roam the forest (from Telichai and Telichu) respectively.

Other spirits are called bunsu jelu (animal spirits), antu utai tumboh (plant spirits), antu (ghosts) such as antu gerasi (huntsman) and antu menoa (place spirits like hills or mounts). These spirits can be helpful in achieving success in life or malevolent like causing sickness or even madness to humans. Therefore, the Iban in general needs to keep peace and harmony with nature.

The souls of dead ancestors are invoked by the Iban when seeking their blessings. They pay their respects to their souls during Gawai Antu (Festival of the Dead) and when visiting their graves.

=== Iban propitiation ===
Masing in 1981 and Sandin clearly categorise Iban's propitiation and worshiping into three main successive stages of increasing importance, complexity and intensity, i.e. bedara (serving and distributing offerings), gawa (literally working) and gawai (festival).

Bedara (miring) is called bedera mata (unripe rite) if the service is performed inside the family room (bilik) and bedara mansau (ripen rite) if it is held at the family gallery (ruai). IN the upper Rajang, the offering ceremony inside the family room can be performed by women while that at the open gallery must be carried out by men of stature. Other specific miring rituals are called minta ujan (asking for rain), minta panas (asking for sunniness), berunsur (soul cleansing), mudas (omen appreciation), muja menua (praying to the region), pelasi menua (cleansing the territory), genselan menoa (smearing the earth with blood) or nasih tanah (paying land rent). Other bedara or miring ceremonies include makai di ruai/ngayanka asi (dinner at the gallery), sandau ari (mid-day ceremony) and enchaboh arong (head receiving ceremony).

Gawa includes all the medium-sized rites that normally involve one day and one night of ritual incantations by a group of bards such as gawa beintu-intu (self-caring rituals) and gawa tuah (fortune ritual). There are various types of gawa beintu-intu such as imang sukat (Life Measuring Chant), timang bulu (Human Mantle Chant), timang buloh ayu (Soul Bamboo Chant), timang panggang (Jar Board Chant), timang panggau (Wooden Platform Chant) and timang engkuni (House Post Chant). As this category of rites involves mainly timang (chant), it is also normally called nimang (chanting). Gawa Tuah has three stages called nimang ngiga tuah (fortune seeking), nimang namaka tuah (fortune welcoming) and madamka tuah (fortune termination).

Gawai comprises seven main categories of large festivals which mostly involve long ritual incantation by a group of lemambang bards that can last from several to seven successive days and nights to follow the paddy farming cycle in succession of stages. These categories are namely gawai bumai (farming festivals), gawai amat/asal (real/original festival) or gawai burong (bird festival), gawai tuah (fortune festival), gawai lelabi (River turtle/marriage festival), gawai sakit (Healing festival), gawai antu (festival of the dead) and gawai ngar (dyeing/weaving festival).

== Iban ritual festivals and rites ==
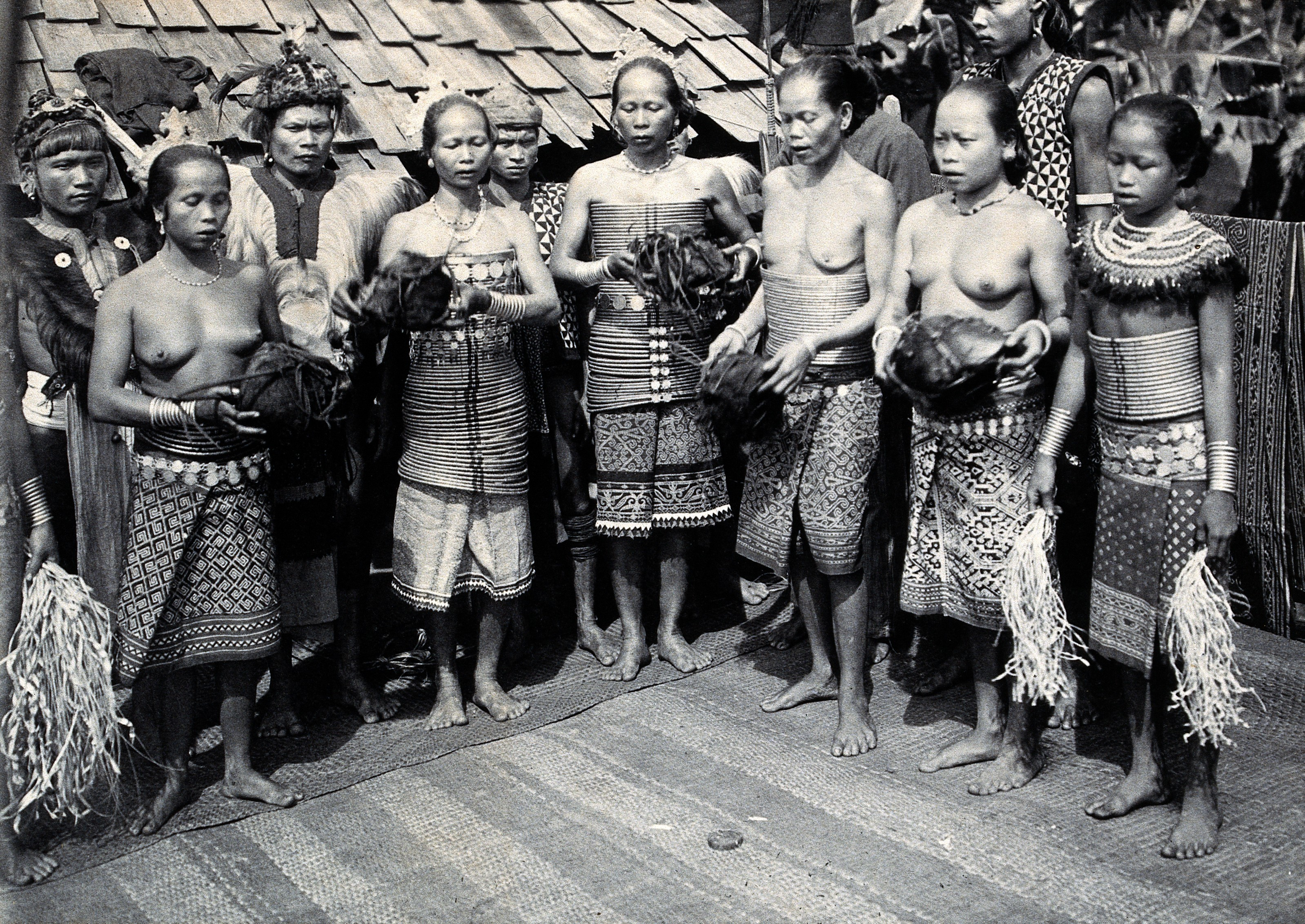
An Iban head feast.

Significant traditional festivals, or gawai, to propitiate the above-mentioned gods can be grouped into seven categories which are related to the main ritual activities among the Iban Dayak:

- Farming-related festivals to propitiate the deity of agriculture Sempulang Gana,
- War-related festivals to honor the deity of war Sengalang Burong,
- Fortune-related festivals dedicated to the deity of fortune Anda Mara,
- Reproductivity-related festival (Gawai Melah Pinang) for the deity of creation Selampandai,
- Health-related festivals for the deity of shamanism Menjaya and Ini Andan and
- Death-related festival (Gawai Antu or Ngelumbong) to invite the dead souls for final separation ritual between the living and the dead.
- Weaving-related festival (Gawai Ngar) for patrons of weaving.

Besides these seven main categories, there are two more types of rituals i.e. dream festival and intermediate-scale chanting rites.

=== Farming ritual festivals ===
Because rice farming is the key life-sustaining activity among Dayaks, the first category of festivals is related to agriculture. Thus, there are many ritual festivals dedicated to this foremost vital activity namely:

1. Gawai Batu (Whetstone Festival),
2. Gawai Benih (Seed Festival),
3. Gawai Ngalihka Tanah (or Manggol) (Soil Ploughing Festival),
4. Gawai Ngemali Umai (Farm-healing Festival),
5. Gawai Matah (Harvest-starting Festival)
6. Gawai Ngambi Sempeli (Taking Secondary Paddy Festival),
7. Gawai Basimpan (Rice-Keeping) Festival and
8. Gawai Tajau (Jar Welcoming Festival).

The Jar festival also invokes Raja Sempulang Gana as the god of agriculture because surplus paddy is used to buy jars and brassware in the past. There is one important rite called mudas for strengthening any omen encountered during farming activity. Several of these festivals have been relegated to simpler or intermediate ceremonies, which mainly involve nimang (incantation) only and are thus no longer prefixed with the word gawai, e.g. nimang benih in the case of Gawai Benih, ngalihka tanah, ngemali umai by a dukun (healer) for minor or intermediate damage of paddy farm instead of a full-scale Gawai Ngemali Umai, matah and ngambi sempeli.

The rice planting stages start from manggol (ritual initial clearing to seek good omen using a birdstick (tambak burong), nebas (clearing undergrowth), nebang (felling trees), ngerangkaika reban (drying out trees), nunu (burning), ngebak and nugal (clearing unburnt trees and dibbling), mantun (weeding), ninjau belayan (surveying the paddy growth), ngitang tali buru (hanging the protective rope), nekok/matah (first harvesting), ngetau (harvesting), nungku (separating rice grains), basimpan (rice keeping) and nanam taya ba jerami/nempalai kasai (cotton planting).

With the coming of rubber and pepper planting, the Ibans have adapted the Gawai Ngemali Umai (Paddy Farm Healing Festival) and Gawai Batu (Whetstone Festival) to hold Gawai Getah (Rubber Festival) to sharpen the tapping knives and Gawai Lada (Pepper Festival) to avoid diseases and pests associated with pepper planting respectively.

=== War ritual festivals ===
The second most important activity among the Iban in the past is headhunting (ngayau) in enemy country. Hence, the war-related festivals is held in honour of the war god, Sengalang Burong (Hawk the Bird) which manifests as the brahminy kite. These festivals are collectively called Gawai Burong (Bird Festival) in the Saribas/Skrang region or Gawai Amat (Proper Festival) in the Mujong region or Gawai Asal (Original Festival) in the Baleh region. Each set of festivals has a number of successive stages to be initiated by a notable man of prowess from time to time and hosted by individual longhouses. It originally honors warriors, but during more peaceful times has evolved into a wellness or fortune seeking ceremony.

The rules regarding headhunting and skull-related rites are as follows:

1. If a warrior got 3 human skulls, he can hold enchaboh arong to cleanse and strengthen his souls against bad elements.
2. If a warrior got 3 human skulls, he can hold naku antu pala to parade and praise his trophy heads by the women. This ceremony declares him a bujang berani (a lieutenant).
3. If he got 7 human skulls, he can hang a bengkong (a loop made of rattan or randau) to hang and display his skull trophies over an open bedilang hearth.
4. If he got one bengkong, he can become a raid leader (at a major) attacking one longhouse at a time.
5. If he got 3 bengkong, he can become a war leader (a general) and hold a gawai burung (bird festival) befitting his accomplishments where his human skulls are paraded, chanted for, and respected. This festival declares him a raja berani (the king of valour).
6. If he does not hold a gawai burung, he can hold a gawai kenyalang berani (brave hornbill festival) instead.
7. After praising the hornbill (nimang kenyalang) statue, he can parade and praise it (naku kenyalang) along the longhouse gallery and among the audience.

Accordingly, the rank and status of the warrior will ascend from a bujang berani (brave warrior), tau kayau (raid leader) and tau serang (war general). Alternatively, the war leaders are called raja berani (the brave and rich)

==== Bird Festival ====
Gawai Burong which is mainly celebrated in the Saribas and Skrang region comprises nine ascending stages as follows:

1. Gawai Kalingkang (munti/payan pole) – pengap until ngiga tanah
2. Gawai Sandong (betung/pinang trunk)- pengap from ngamboh until manggul
3. Gawai Sawi (sawi/rian pole) – pengap from nebang, nunu to ngerara ibun
4. Gawai Salangking – selangking with a bungkong tajau baru – pengap until nyulap
5. Gawai Mulong Merangau (Weeping Palm) or Lemba Bumbun (durian tree trunk cleverly carved like an old sago palm tree after all of its fruits has fallen to the ground – pengap until nugal
6. Gawai Gajah Meram (Brooding Elephant) with Besandau Liau (a strong tree trunk with branches decorated with skulls and isang leaves)- pengap until mantun
7. Gawai Meligai (Upper Palace) (decorated strong wood pole) – pengap until nyembui
8. Gawai Ranyai (Tree of life) or Mudur Ruruh (the pole is made up of a bunch of warriors' spears) – pengap until basimpan
9. Gawai Gerasi Papa (Demon Huntman) – the house where this gawai is held is abandoned because the inhabitants have to transfer to a new house.

The chiefs and elders of the longhouses will convene and decide which stage of the Bird Festival fits the life achievements of each celebrant-to-be.

After a warrior obtains his first three heads, a ritual called 'enchaboh arong' (head feast) is held to honour (naku) and clean the heads by throwing out all the skin, flesh and brain inside by the most senior war leader using a war knife and a rattan to swirl out the brain in a flowing river water. During this ritual, the chief would first take a bit of the brain using the tip of his sword and put it into a lump of glutinous rice and then eat it while reciting a prayer to declare that his spirit presides over the spirit of the head and the victim. This 'eating' symbolizes the master-slave relationship between the victim and the owner of the skull. Upon reaching the longhouse, the wives or mothers would receive the heads obtained by their husbands or sons respectively using a ceremonial plate underneath of which was placed a ritual cloth (pua kumbu) which has been woven by the respective women earlier. The common motive of the ritual cloth is called "lebur api' (the heath of fire). Therefore, the women would weave ceremonial cloths according to the progress of their men. In a way, the weaving of a certain motive would incite the men to obtain heads of their traditional enemy as necessary. A guiltless people shall not be attacked and doing so would result in adverse curse called 'busong' of the perpetrators.

==== Hornbill Festival ====
Alternatively, the Iban can choose to celebrate another type of bravery-related rite i.e. a rhinoceros hornbill festival (gawai kenyalang). This festival comprises three stages of chanting i.e. nesting (besarang), egg laying (betelu) and flying (terebai). The Iban believes this festival originated by the heroes of Panggau and Gelong i.e. Keling and Laja when they beautifully handcrafted a hornbill statue for their sweethearts (Kumang and Lulong) respectively which become alive and flew to the doors of their sweethearts' family rooms upon revelation to the audience. The beaks of the hornbill statues must be directed to the country of the enemies so that the hornbills fly there to attack and peck the eyes of the enemies in advance of the incoming attack. Hence, the hornbill festival is held to honour and propitiate the heroes of Panggau and Gelong who are believed to be able to assist in major undertakings like wars, depending on the guardian of the warrior.

==== Proper Festival ====
In the Baleh region, the Iban there celebrates a slightly different set of Gawai Amat (Proper Festival) as listed by Masing but certainly for similar purposes:

1. Gawai Tresang Mansau (a red bamboo pole receptacle)
2. Gawai Kalingkang (a bamboo pole receptacle with a pan made of bamboo)
3. Gawai Ijok Pumpong (decapitating of gamuti palm ritual)
4. Gawai Tangga Raja (notched-ladder of wealth)
5. Gawai Kayu Raya (tree of wealth ritual)
6. Gawai Kenyalang (hornbill ritual)
7. Gawai Nangga Langit (notched-ladder to the sky)
8. Gawai Tangga Ari (notched-ladder of day) – this festival is a reconstruction of the Iban famous ancestor, Bejie's undertaking of building a notched ladder to the sky to meet God.

The chiefs and elders of the longhouses will convene and decide which degree of the original festival that fits the achievement of each celebrant to be.

There are nine levels of the timang inchantation length with their respective end timing as follows:

1. Ngerara rumah (start of timang to discovery of Lang's absence)
2. Ngua (nursing the trophy head) – Afternoon second day
3. Nyingka (end of forging) – Later afternoon third day
4. Bedua antara (dividing the land) – Afternoon fourth day
5. Nyulap (first rite of planting) – Morning fifth day
6. Ninjau balayan (surveying the padi) – Morning fifth day
7. Nekok (first rite of harvesting) – Afternoon fifth day
8. Nyimpan padi (storing the padi) – Afternoon fifth day
9. Nempalai kasai (planting of cotton) – Morning seventh day

==== Original Festival ====
Besides that, there is another list of gawai asal (original gawai) of Iban living the upper Batang Rajang with eight successive stages as per Saleh:

1. Gawai Tresang Mansau (a bamboo receptacle erected under the roof atap downend)
2. Gawai Kalingkang (a woven huge bamboo receptacle erected in the middle of the tanju)
3. Gawai Ijok Pumpong (a woven huge bamboo basket or mat hung using a rattan which will be slashed by a sword)
4. Gawai Sempuyung Mata Ari (a split bamboo cone to receive fresh head skull)
5. Gawai Lemba Bumbun (Lemba split leaves which represent taken enemy's hairs)
6. Gawai Kenyalang (erection of hornbill statues to attack enemies before headhunting raids)
7. Gawai Sandung Liau (a wooden pole with a boat head statue (udu prau)
8. Gawai Mapal Tunggul (Decapitating tree stump with erected three poles in series in the tanju)

For all three groups of war-related festival above, as the stage of the celebration ascends the list, the level of the timang incantation also increases, following the paddy farming stages with the first stage normally ends up to ngua (nursing) level after which gods will presents gifts in the forms of charms or medicines which help or eases the life building activities of the festival host and fellow celebrants.

=== Fortune ritual festivals ===
Seeking health, wealth, fame and prosperity is another important activity of the Iban. Therefore, the third category of festivals is fortune-related festivals which include Gawai Pangkong Tiang (House Main Post Striking Festival) or Gawai Tuah with three successive stages (Luck Seeking, Luck Welcoming and Luck Growing). Some Iban people call Gawai Pangkong Tiang as Gawai Niat (Intention Festival) or Gawai Diri (Rising up Festival).

=== Reproductivity ritual festivals ===
Furthermore, the Iban love to bear and raise many children to continue their descendancy (peturun), as a means to acquire more land and wealth and perhaps to multiply in numbers as a natural defence against enemy tribes. So comes the fourth category of festival which is reproductivity-related i.e. Gawai Lelabi (River Turtle Festival) that is held for announcing readiness of daughters for marriage and to call for suitable suitors. The wedding ceremony is itself called Melah Pinang (Areca beetle nut splitting) which is celebrated with much fanfare and ritual. Here the God invoked is Selampandai for fertility and reproductive purposes to bear many children. In addition, if an Iban married couple could not bear any child after some years of marriage, they can decide to adopt via a Gawai Bairu-Iru (Adoption Festival) to declare that they have adopted someone which shall have the same rights as their own born child. Furthermore, Gawai Batimbang (Manutrition Festival) can be held to free ulun slaves (war captives) or serfs (debtors) and/or to adopt them as children or siblings or relatives of their masters.

=== Health ritual festivals ===
The Iban pay great attention to their health and well-being to have a long life (gayu). So the fifth category of festivals is health-related festivals which are Gawai Sakit (Sickness Festival), Gawai Betawai (Name Changing Festival), Besugi Sakit (Healing by Keling) and Barenong Sakit (Healing by Menjaya). Before employing these healing festivals, there are various types of pelian (healing ceremony) by a manang (traditional healer), pucau (short prayers) and begama (touching) by a dukun (medicinal healer) to be tried first. A candidate will become a manang (shaman) after an official ceremony called Gawai Babangun (Manang-Officiating Festival).

=== Death ritual festivals ===
The sixth category of festivals by the Iban is related to death which is called the Spirit festival for the dead (Gawai Antu) or Gawai Rugan (Dead Soul Altar Festival) or Gawai Sungkop (Tomb Festival) in the Saribas/Skrang region or Gawai Ngelumbong (Entombment Festival) in the Baleh region. This festival is used to be held once every 10 to 30 years per longhouse. This festival is the last honouring event in a series of morturial rites from nyengai antu/rabat (death vigil), nganjong antu (burial), baserara bungai (soul separation) and ngetas ulit (mourning termination). During this festival, the dead souls or spirits are invited to attend.

A warrior is appointed to drink the ai garong (believed to be the lipid liquid from the dead body) as symbolized using tuak kept in a short bamboo cylinder placed inside a beautifully woven basket called garong hung on the erected ranyai tree. Another junior warriors may drink the ai jalong (put in several ceremonial cups) which is chanted for the whole night.

The chanting is to narrate the invitation and coming of souls from the land of the dead (sebayan) led by their king by the name of Raja Niram. Among the entourage are the Iban famous warriors in the region who have died. So, the ai jalong drinking ceremony is performed in memory of the famous warriors. Before drinking the two sacred wines, the chanting bard will ask the warriors of their praisenames which they declare to the audience, which indicate the achievements of the warriors and are often followed by war cries and standing ovations. Only warriors who ever obtain enemy heads are permitted to drink both sacred wines. A sacred hut is made for each dead and erected over their grave on the following day.

=== Weaving ritual festivals ===
While the Iban man strives to be a successful in headhunting and wealth acquisition, the Iban women aims to be skillful in weaving which is considered women's own warpath because weaving needs guiding spirits (albeit female) like those for headhunting. For women involved in weaving, their ritual festival is called Gawai Ngar (Cotton-Dyeing Festival). This can perhaps be considered the seventh category of festivals among the Iban. Pua Kumbu, the Iban traditional hand-woven cloth and custom, is used for both conventional and ceremonial uses in many occasions. There are various types of buah (motives or patterns) of pua kumbu which can be for ritual purposes or normal uses. A motive called "Lebor Api" (Melting Fire) is used to ceremously receive freshly-taken heads. Both female and male Iban will be graded according to their own personal accomplishments in their lifetime during the rite of ngambi entabalu (widow/widower fee taking).

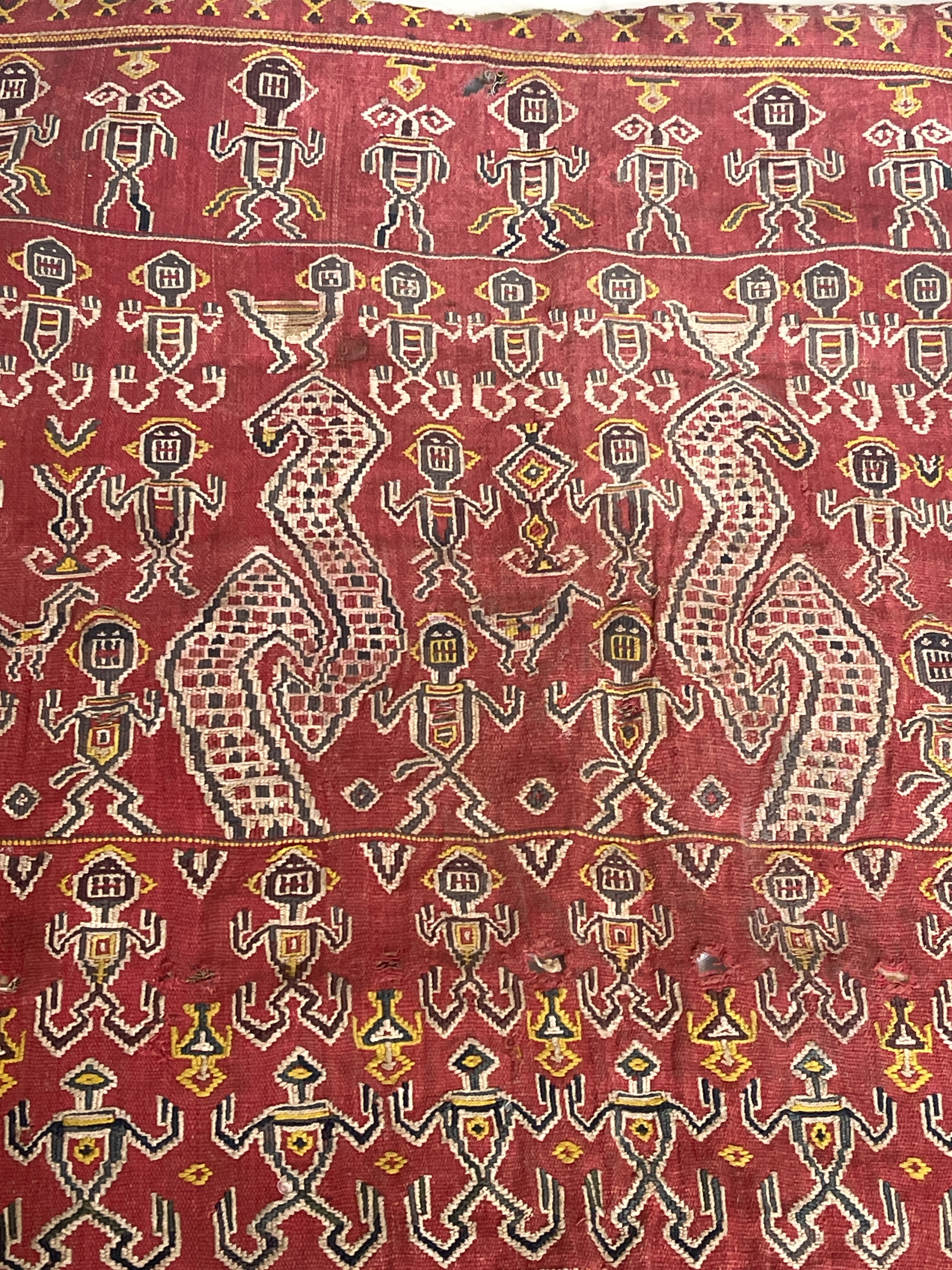
Detail of an Antique Dayak Iban Weaving courtesy wovensouls

=== Dream Festival ===
There is an emerging category of life-building gawai called dream festivals such as Gawai Lesong (Rice Mortar Festival) and Gawai Tangga (Notched Ladder Festival) and some newly innovated variants of the gawai proper as a result of dream by a person or several individuals. These are popular among the Iban in the upper Rajang region. It appears that the Iban people in this region distinguishes gawai asal (original/customary/traditional festival) from gawai mimpi (dream festival).

The original festival consists of the nine successive and ascending stages of major celebrations as listed by Dr. Robert Menua of Tun Jugah Foundation during an individual Iban man life as if he ascends the longhouse notched ladder rungs. This category of original festival can be celebrated by any Iban if it is deemed fit to do so as he ages during his lifetime, even without any dream.

The Iban will hold a dream festival when told to do so in a dream which will instruct the type and sometimes even the procedure of the festival to be held and thus it is fittingly coined as dream festival. Some variants of the gawai lesong (mortar festival) and gawai tangga (ladder festival) were inspired by dreams as mentioned in Dr. James Masing's PhD thesis so these can actually be considered as dream festival. However, these are called gawai amat (proper/real festival) as the full, elaborate and complex procedure of an Iban festival is strictly followed and implemented during its celebration. A good example to accompany this explanation is the hornbill festival which was held not only as an original festival but also as a dream festival with variations in its procedure of celebration.

Several types of Iban festivals originate from its own epic stories like the hornbill festival from the story of Keling and Laja of Panggau making a hornbill statue for their resptive maidens Kumang and Lulong whom they courted for their famous wives from Gelong while the Gawai Kayu Raya (Massive Tree Festival) also originates from Keling's adventure to fetch the massive tree from overseas that can bear many types of nutritional fruits as if it is a ranyai (tree of life).

=== Intermediate ritual rites ===
For simplicity and cost savings, some of the gawai have been relegated into the medium category of propitiation called gawa such as Gawai Tuah into Nimang Tuah, Gawai Benih into Nimang Benih and Gawa Beintu-intu into their respective nimang category wherein the key activity is the timang inchantation by the bards. Gawai Matah can be relegated into a minor rite simply called matah. The first dibbling (nugal) session is normally preceded by a miring offering ceremony of medium size with kibong padi (paddy's net) is erected with three flags. The paddy's net is erected by splitting a bamboo trunk into four pieces along its length with their tips inserted into the ground soil. Underneath the paddy's net, all the paddy seeds in baskets or gunny sacks are kept before being distributed by a line of ladies into dibbled holes by a line men in front.

With headhunting banned and with the advance of Christianity, only some lower ranking ritual festivals are often celebrated by the Iban today such as Sandau Ari (Mid-Day Rite), Gawai Kalingkang (Bamboo Receptacle Festival), Gawai Batu (Whetstone Festival), Gawai Tuah (Fortune Festival) and Gawai Antu (Festival for the Dead Relatives) which can be celebrated without the timang jalong (ceremonial cup chanting) which reduces its size and cost.

It is common that all those festivals are to be celebrated after the rice harvesting completion which is normally by the end of May during which rice is plenty for holding feasts along with poultry like pigs, chickens, fish from rivers and jungle meats like deer etc. Therefore, it is fitting to call this festive season among Dayak collectively as the Gawai Dayak festival which is celebrated every year on 1 June, at the end of the harvest season, to worship the Lord Sempulang Gana and other gods. On this day, the Iban get together to celebrate, often visiting each other.

== Iban piring or ritual offerings ==
The Iban leka piring which is the number of each offering item is basically according to the single odd numbers which are piring turun 1, 3, 5, 7 and 9. Leka piring (the number of each offering item) depends on how many deities are to be invited and presented with offerings which number should normally be an odd figure.

The list of deities to be prayed to and offered with foods and drinks are as follows:

- Sengalang Burong – when preparing for war or major event like participating in election. Gawai Burong is usually held to honor him and to seek his blessing.
- Raja Simpulang Gana – when dealing with farming related activities, during Gawai Umai and related festivals.
- Raja Menjaya & Ini Inda – when asking for better health during Gawai Sakit and related activities such as belian.
- Anda Mara – when seeking good fortune and material wealth, during Gawai Pangkong Tiang.
- Selampandai – when seeking blessings in marriage, growth of children, or fertility, during Gawai Melah Pinang.
- Raja Semarugah – when seeking permission to use land for construction and other activities like agricultural activities (when erecting the first pole).
- Keling and orang Panggau and Gelong – when seeking their help to go to war, election, defence from enemies, or when seeking their help to invite gods to festivals.
- Souls of dead ancestors – when seeking their blessing and showing respect for their soul. Usually during Gawai Antu and when visiting their graves.
- Bunsu Antu – as and when instructed in dreams.

The set of offerings (agih piring) is dedicated to each part of the long house room (bilek) such as bilek four corners, tanju (verandah), ruai (gallery), dapur (kitchen), benda beras (rice jar), pelaboh (verandah behind the kitchen), farm (umai), garden of rubber or black pepper, other possessions like long boat (prau) with its engine, tajau (jar), cannon (meriam) and modern items like, car, motorcycle, etc. as deemed fit and necessary.

The rule on how to choose the leka piring according to its purpose is as follows:

- Leka piring 1 – piring jari (personal offering inside a pair of hands made into a bowl-like to be eaten by the owner of the hands)
- Leka piring 3 – piring ampun/seluwak (for apologies or economy)
- Leka piring 5 – piring minta/ngiring bejalai (for requests or journey)
- Leka piring 7 – piring gawai/bujang berani (for festivals or brave men)
- Leka piring 8 – piring nyangkong (for including others)
- Leka piring 9 – piring nyangkong/turu (for including others and any leftover offering items are placed together)
- Leka lebih ari 9 (11, 13, 15, 18 up to 30) – piring turu (leftover offering items must be all offered and cannot be eaten). These are for piring tanam (base) or piring pucuk (tip) (offerings for setting up pnadong/ranyai (ritual shrine) during major festivals.

The number of each item of offerings (leka pring) can be varied according to the importance of the god or item. The number of each item of offerings can be multiplied to correspond with the locations for placing the offerings. A plate, wide leave or a woven bamboo basket will be used for serving the offerings. Most of the times, the offerings are hung onto a part of the building or tree branch or trunk, placed over a jar or simple platform or a bamboo stick with a receptacle at its top.

Whenever a simple set of offerings need to be prepared, simple ilum pinang (clumps of Ereca nuts with sireh leave with a splash of white kapu carbonate) will be offered. This is especially so during travelling i.e. when encountering undeliberate omens.

The basic items for common piring offerings include at least the following items in a sequential order:

- betel nuts, sirih leaves, sedi leaves and kapu chalk
- cigar leaves and tobacco
- a lump of normal cooked rice
- a pinch of salt
- 'senupat (sacheted glutinous rice) corresponding with the number of offerings
- sungkoi (wrapped glutinous rice)
- asi pulut pansoh (glutinous rice cooked in bamboo container)
- tumpi (flattened glutinous rice flour cake)
- asi manis (semi-fermented glutinous rice)
- penganan (disc-shaped cake made from glutinous rice flour which is deep-fried in cooking oil)
- cuwan (flowery-shaped molded biscuit made from glutinous rice flour)
- sarang semut (ant nest biscuit made of glutinous rice)
- rendai or letup (pop glutinous paddy)
- tuak (alcoholic drink fermented from glutinous rice with yeast)
- hard-boiled chicken eggs (telu mansau) and uncooked chicken eggs (telu mata)
- A live chicken or a pig is caught and kept ready within a short distance

Special offerings to Lang (god of war) or Keling (cultural hero) has several unique offering items.

So it can be seen from the list of items above that it is customary to offer guests or gods cigarettes, sireh leaves and betel nuts as courtesy dictates. These first items are placed into a brass container which is always ready by each Iban family in the longhouse in anticipation of guests. Secondly it is necessary to offer food and drinks as essential items. It is customary to ask whether guests have already eaten or to invite them straight away to eat once food and dishes are ready, especially during meal times.

In addition, biscuits and deserts are offered after meals as a sign of hospitality in Iban custom. All these ingredients are put onto plates or woven baskets made of bamboo or rattan which are then arranged in several rows on a ritual pua kumbu (ceremonial blanket).

In urgent or emergency cases, ilum pinang (an odd number of lumps of sireh, betel nuts and cigarettes are offered because many Iban would always carry these items anywhere they go or during their travels to negate any bad omens or to show thanks for a good augury. A small offering platform may be built to place this simple offering and a short sampi prayer is recited. At least a fire is lit in recognition of the omen and to warm up those present which necessitates a pause from the current activities at hands.

A number of worthy men are chosen or nominated to divide and serve the offerings onto old clay plates (plastic plates are to be avoided because they are recent invention and indicative of cheapness or lower status unless clay plates are not available or cannot be borrowed from neighbors; at a minimum, the main offering plate must be on a clay plate). Women can be selected especially if the offering is done within the bilek room.

Alternatively, if plates are not available as in the old times or interior upriver regions, square-bottom baskets (called kalingkang) made of bamboo split skins, woven-concave plates made of rattan or randau coils with daun buan or daun long leaves are used. Some offerings are placed on a long bamboo pole with a conical receptacle at its top (teresang). A bigger and more important set of offerings is served on tabak (brass tray) or bebendai (brass snare).

The piring items are taken by those chosen one by one in the order listed above or some people take the oily penganan (sweet disc shaped pancake) as the first favorite delicacy and placed it in the middle of the place or container to prevent stickiness of the fingers and followed by other items. The aim is to serve and present the offerings beautifully and as attractive as possible to arouse the appetite of the guests or gods.

As the propitiation increases in importance and size from normal and brief bedara offerings, to medium-sized gawa ceremonies to huge and lengthy gawai festivals, the number and set of offerings also increases accordingly. All major and minor gods are offered piring offerings to ensure prosperity and peace during the occasions and in life.

The genselan (animal offering) is normally made in the form of a chicken or a pig, depending on the scale of the ceremony. For small ceremonies, e.g. bird omens, chickens will be used, while on larger occasions such as animal omens, pigs will be sacrificed.

The chicken feathers are pulled and smeared into the blood of the chicken whose throat has been slit and the chicken head may be put onto the main offering plate. For festivals, one or several pigs and tens of chickens may be sacrificed to appease the deities invoked and to serve human guests invited to the festivals within the territorial domain of the feast chief.

The pig head may be offered with the offerings or buried into ground. The body of the chicken or pig and leftover piring materials can be eaten by guests, provided the chicken or pig is not killed or sacrificed to cleanse sin or bad luck like in incest cases which can cause havoc (ngudi menua) in the Iban faith. If not eaten, the body may be buried as sacrifice.

== Adat Iban or customary law ==
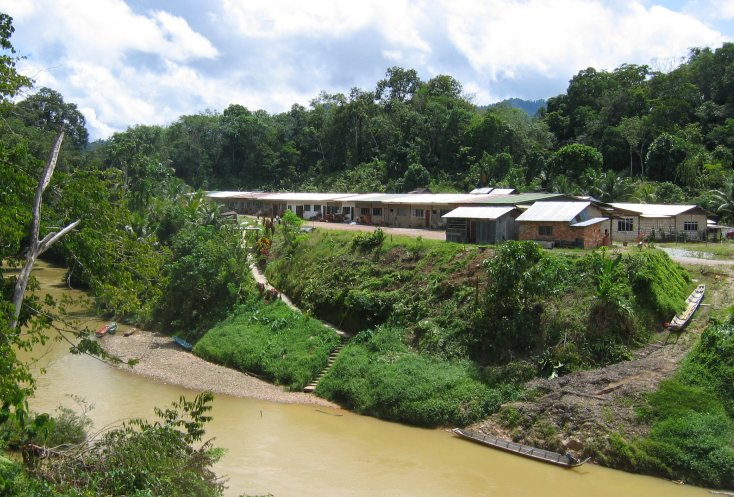
A modern Iban longhouse in Kapit Division.

The Iban use a customary law called adat which are used as social control measures to maintain law and order, keep security and peace, and ensure shared prosperity among them. Among the main sections of customary adat of the Iban Dayaks according to Benedict Sandin are as follows:

- Adat berumah (House building rule)
- Adat melah pinang, butang ngau sarak (Marriage, adultery and divorce rule)
- Adat beranak (Child bearing and raising rule)
- Adat bumai and beguna tanah (Agricultural and land use rule)
- Adat ngayau (Headhunting rule)
- Adat ngasu, berikan, ngembuah and napang manyi (Hunting, fishing, fruit and honey collection rule)
- Adat tebalu, ngetas ulit ngau beserarak bungai(Widow/widower, mourning and soul separation rule)
- Adat begawai (festival rule)
- Adat idup di rumah panjai (Order of life in the longhouse rule)
- Adat betenun, main lama, kajat ngau taboh (Weaving, past times, dance and music rule)
- Adat beburong, bemimpi ngau becenaga ati babi (Bird and animal omen, dream and pig liver rule)
- Adat belelang tauka bejalai (Journey or Sojourn rule)

The Iban social structure is egalitarian. Upon the death of an Iban, there will be a session called ngambi tebalu (taking a fee of appreciation) from the living spouse or the family of the last surviving spouse). After this ceremony is over, the surviving spouse can remarry if he or she wished to do so. The amount of the fee depends on the accomplishment of the deceased during his or her lifetime. The common careers of Iban men are being a warrior, chief, bard, shaman, farmer, trader, etc. while those of Iban women centre on bearing and raising children, farming, weaving, etc.

== Cuisine ==
The Iban's traditional cuisines include lulun or pansoh (foods cooked in bamaboo containers), kasam (meat, fish or vegetables salted and preserved in jars or tin), tuak (glutinous rice wine) and Langkau (vodka from distilled from boiled rice wine).

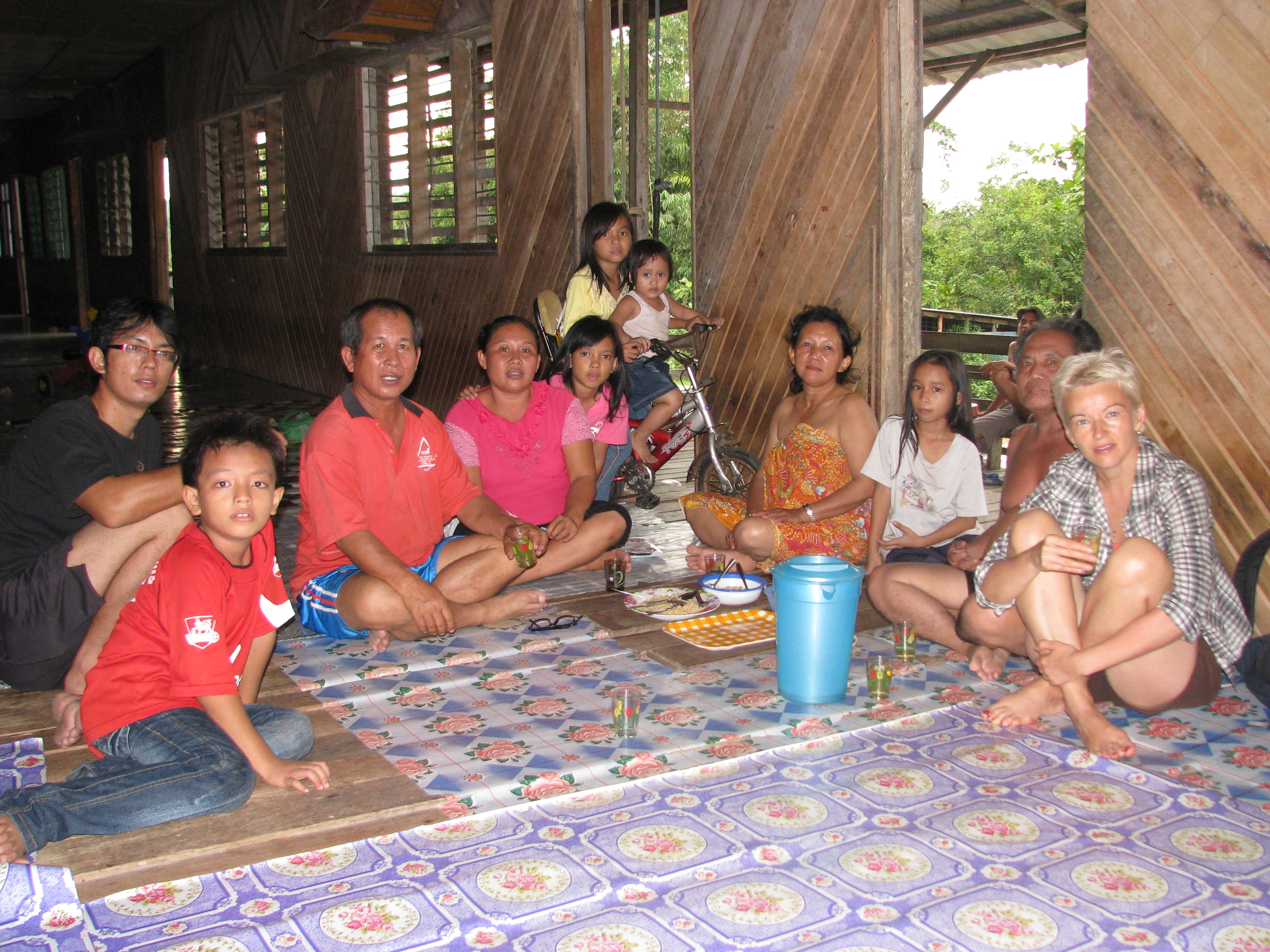
An Iban family serving guest tuak.

The Iban's staple food is rice from paddy planted on hill or swamp with hill rice having better taste and more valuable. A second staple food used to be "mulong" (sago powder) and the third one is tapioca.

The Iban's famous cuisine is called "lulun" or "pansoh" which is wild meat, fish or vegetable cooked in wild bamboo containers over fire. Another dish is called "kasam" which is preserved wild meat, fish or vegetable in salt and placed in a ceramic jar. Natural nuts and leaves (called buah and duan kepayang) are often added into the salt-preserved foods.

Glutinuous rice (asi pulut pansoh) cooked in bamboo containers is a delicacy among the Iban. Powder of glutinous rice is used to make penganan pancake, kui sepit (crab crawls) and sarang semut ant nest biscuit. The source of sugar is honey and sugar cane. The Iban likes to cook their meat or fish as lulun or pansuh to which salt, ginger and vegetable leaves (such as bungkang, riang, tapioca) are added. Soup (sabau) is made of meat and vegetables such as shoots is cooked in an earthenware (periuk tempa) and later in a copper pot (temaga) and steel pot.

Tuak is originally made of cooked glutinous rice (Asi Pulut) mixed with home-made yeast (Chiping/Ragi) for fermentation. It is a rice wine drunk after dinner and served to guests, especially as a welcoming drink when entering a longhouse. Nowadays, there are various kinds of tuak, made with rice alternatives such as sugar cane, ginger and corn. However, these raw materials are rarely used unless available in large quantities.

Tuak and other types of drinks (both alcohol and non-alcoholic) can be served on several rounds in a ceremony called nyibur temuai (serving drinks to guests) as ai aus (thirst quenching drink), ai basu kaki (feet washing drink), ai basa (respect drink) and ai untong (profit drink). The drink server will give the toast speech before each round of the drink.

Another type of a stronger alcoholic drink is called langkau or "arak panduk", which contains a higher alcohol content. It is made from tuak which has been distilled over fire to boil off the alcohol into vapour, which is then cooled and collected into a container. Ijok (gamulti palm) drink is another type of alcoholic drink among the Iban.

Other traditional cakes are called sarang semut (ants' nest, penganan or penyaram (discus-shaped cake) and kui sepit (twisted cake) which can last longer due to deep frying in cooking oil. Other delicacies include emping padi (rice oat), rendai (popped rice), tumpi (disc-shaped cake), asi pulut (cooked in bamaboo container or daun long leaves), senupat (cooked in woven containers or pokyuk).

Besides rice, the Iban eat linut mulong (sago flour) and tapioca. Lingkau or nyeli and millet are also planted among the hill paddy. The Iban's signature vegetable is called the "terung asam" which is in a globe shape and sour in taste. Ensabi iban is a type of spinach planted after burning of hill paddy farm.

== Iban omens and augury ==
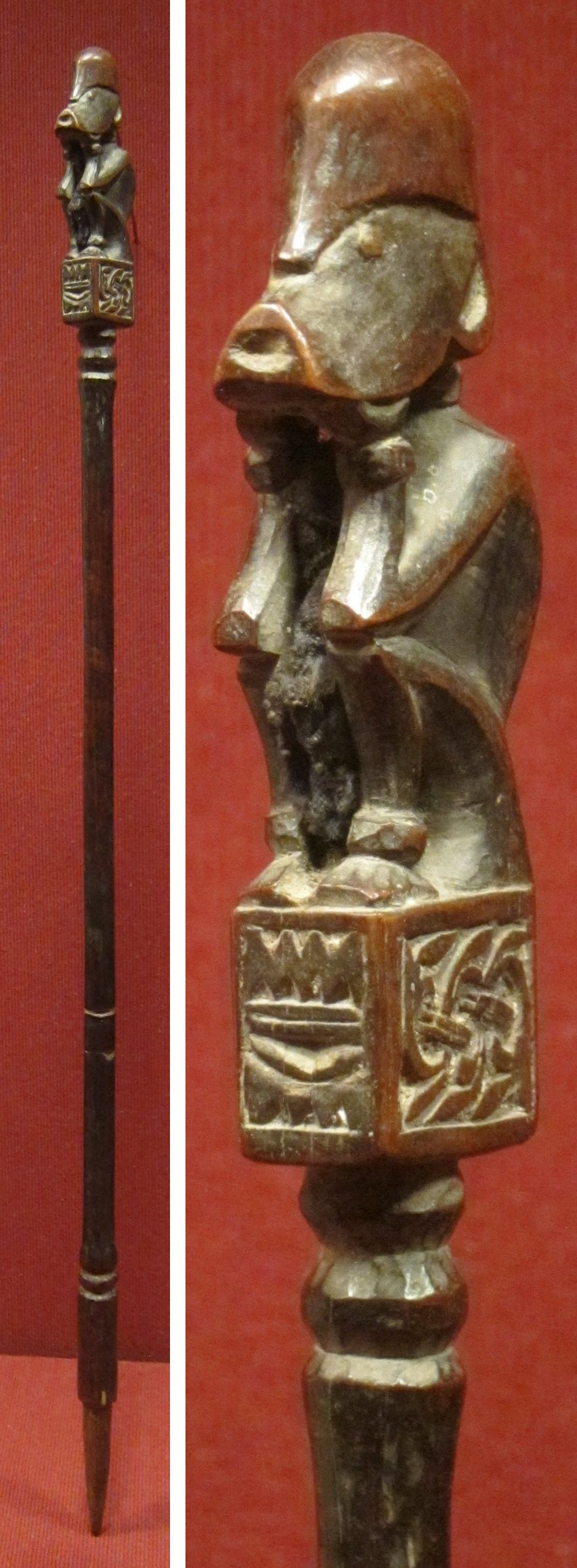
A 20th century Iban Pig charm (tuntun) made of ironwood from Sarawak at the Honolulu Museum of Art.

The augury system for the Iban Dayaks depends on several ways to obtain indicative omens for decision making and action taking, either deliberately sought or accidentally encountered:

- dream to present charm gifts or sumpah (curse) by spirits which normally has a long or life-time effect.
- omen animals (burong laba) such as deer barkings which also has life-time effects.
- omen birds (burong Mali) which give temporary effects limited to certain activities at hands e.g. that year of farming.
- pig liver divination (Betenong ati babi) at the end of certain festival to read the future luck.
- areca nut blossom flower (betenong ngena bungai pinang) after pelian healing ceremony.
- nampok (seclusion) or betapa (isolation)

The omens can be either deliberately sought via dream during sleep, langkau burong (bird hut), pig liver divination and seclusion/isolation or unexpectedly encountered by chance especially the animal and bird omens e.g. while working at farms or walking to enemy country.

For agricultural augury, there are eleven augury animals which are under Sempulang Gana and empowered by the deities to send a stroke of luck (nganjong laba) to human farmers in the world of men:

- Tuchok or Belangkiang (lizard with a white stripe along its mouth),
- Ulat Bulu (Hairy caterpillar),
- Ingkat (Tarsier),
- Bengkang (Slow Loris),
- Menarat (Monitor Lizard),
- Pelandok (Mousedeer),
- Landak (Porcupine),
- Kijang (Barking deer),
- Rusa (Sambar deer),
- Beruang (Bear) and
- Jani Babas (Wild boar).

Logically, the presence of these animals indicates that the land is fertile for agriculture as the animals find foods and drinks, and may live in this area where the natural growth of the forest or jungle has reached a mature stage with plenty of dead things which act as natural fertilizer when burnt in addition to ash of cut and burnt trees and bushes. The Iban would observe the size of trees to be about a hug around the perimeter of the tree trunk to roughly indicate the fertility and suitability of the land for farming.

The augury snakes that represent the earthly forms of People of Panggau and Gelong include kendawang coral snakes (Maticora spp.), cobra (tedong), hamadryad (belalang) and python (sawa). The presence of these poisonous snakes indicates danger to humans so it is advisable to return home and take the day off for safety purposes to avoid untoward harms.

The omen birds that send guidance and warnings from Sengalang Burong are seven in total namely:

- ketupong also known as jaloh or kikeh or entis (rufous piculet),
- beragai (scarlet-rumped trogon),
- pangkas (maroon woodpecker) on the right hand of the Sengalang Burong's longhouse bilek and
- Bejampong (crested jayshrike),
- embuas (banded kingfisher),
- kelabu papau (Senabong) (Diard's trogon) and
- nendak (white-rumped shama).

Their types of calls, flights, places of hearing and circumstances of the listeners are factors to be considered during the interpretation of the bird omens. The bird omens can be sought deliberately before starting major activities or encountered accidentally while working or travelling.

The type of sacrifice (genselan) used is determined by the type of omen i.e. a chicken is used for bird omens while a pig is used for animal omens. In the absence of a pig, two chickens can be used instead.

The Iban Dayaks used to believe in having charms namely ubat (medicine), pengaroh (amulet), empelias (anti-line of fire) and engkerabun (blurredness) given by gods and spirits to help them to accomplish successes in life such as getting bountiful harvest, game or jars, to make them kebal (weapon-proof), unseen to human eyes or to make them extraordinarily stronger (kering) than other men. These attributes are wanted for rice farming, headhunting and other activities. For ladies, the charms will help them to be fertile in bearing children and skillful in weaving.

== Warfare ==
Among the Iban Dayaks, the origin of warfare (locally known as ngayau or kayau) or headhunting (as called by Westerners) is believed to be the prior practice of using warfare as the final option for conflict or dispute resolution especially in the case of power struggles among the descendants of Raja Durong at the time of Sengalang Burung against his arch enemy, Nising and the descendants of Tambai Chiri at the time of Keling against his uncle, Apai Sabit Berkaitan who slayed his Iban father, Gamuring Gading.

The subsequent revelation of the mourning law by a spirit, Puntang Raga to he Iban leader, Serapoh is not the origin of warfare among Iban. The first rule of the mourning law is as follows:

1. Immediately after death, the corpse must be properly washed and dressed in its best dress. After this its forehead is marked with three yellow spot of turmeric, and finally the corpse is moved to the gallery (ruai), where it is placed inside an enclosure of woven blanket called “sapat”.

There were various reasons for headhunting as listed below:

- For soil fertility, Dayaks hunted fresh heads before the paddy harvesting seasons after which a head festival would be held in honour of the new heads.
- To add supernatural strength which Dayaks believed to be centred in the soul and head of humans. Fresh heads can give magical powers for communal protection, bountiful paddy harvesting, and disease curing.
- To exact revenge for murders based on the "blood credit" principle unless "adat pati nyawa" (customary compensation token) is paid.
- To pay the dowry for marriages e.g. "derian palit mata" (eye blocking dowry) for Ibans once blood has been splashed prior to agreeing to marriage and, of course, new fresh heads show prowess, bravery, ability and capability to protect his family, community and land
- For the foundation of new buildings to be stronger and meaningful than the normal practice of not putting in human heads.
- For protection against enemy attacks according to the principle of "attack first before being attacked".
- As a symbol of power and social status ranking where the more heads someone has, the more respect and glory due to him. The warleader is called tuai serang (warleader) or raja berani (king of the brave) while kayau anak (small raid) leader is only called tuai kayau (raid leader) whereby adat tebalu (widower rule) after their death would be paid according to their ranking status in the community.
- For territorial expansion where some brave Dayaks intentionally migrated into new areas such as Mujah "Buah Raya" or migrated from Skrang to Paku to Kanowit while infighting among Ibans themselves in Batang Ai caused the Ulu Ai Ibans to migrate to Batang Kanyau River in Kapuas, Kalimantan and then proceed to Katibas and later on Ulu Rajang in Sarawak. The earlier migrations from Kapuas to Batang Ai, Batang Lupar, Batang Saribas, and Batang Krian rivers were also made possible by fighting the local tribes like Bukitan.

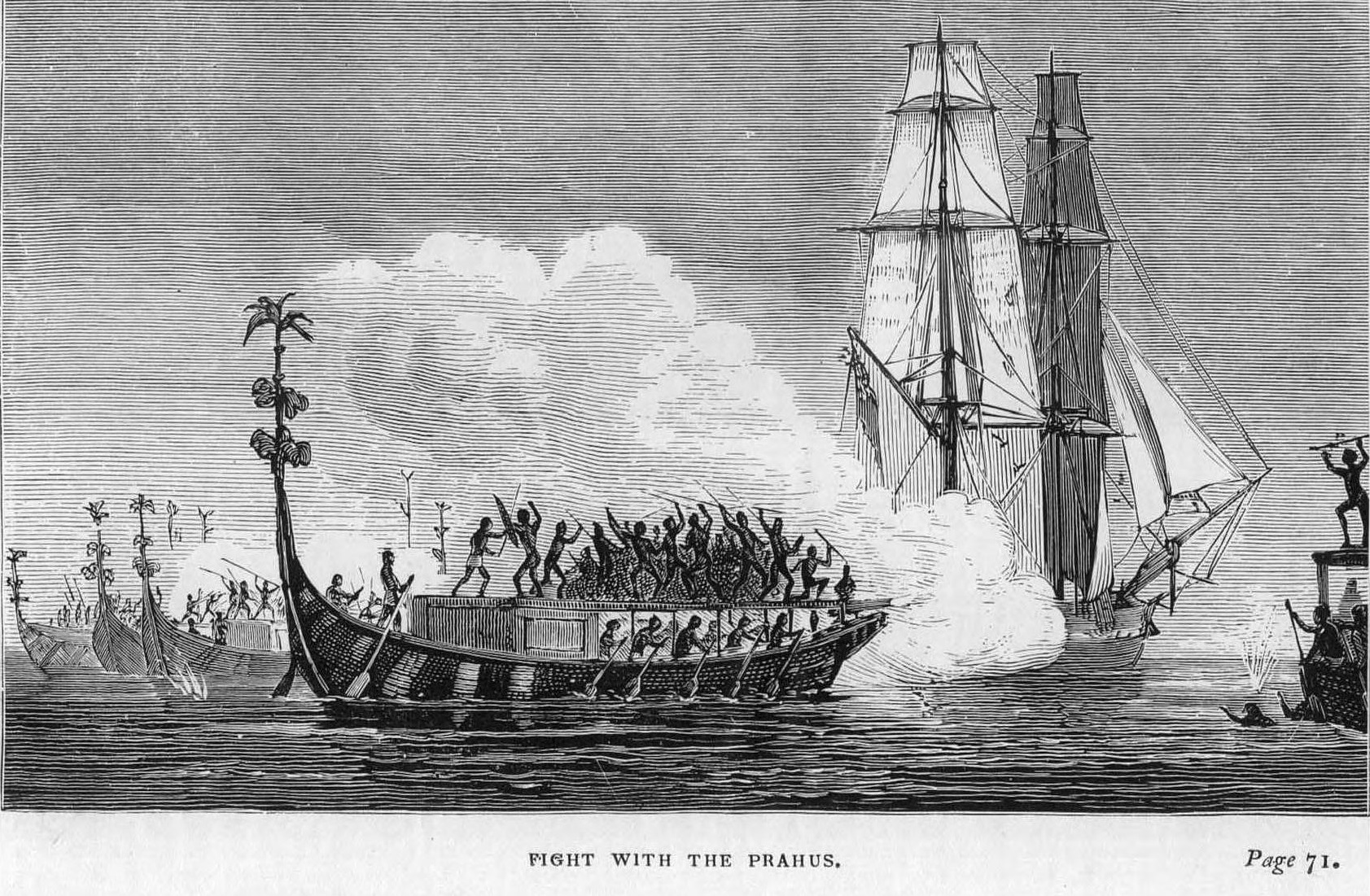
Iban Dayak bangkong fleet attacking brig Lily.

Often, a war leader had at least three lieutenants (called manuk sabong) who in turn had some followers. The war (ngayau) rules among the Iban Dayaks are listed below:

- If a warleader leads a party on an expedition, he must not allow his warriors to fight a guiltless tribe that has no quarrel with them.
- If the enemy surrenders, he may not take their lives, lest his army is unsuccessful in future warfare and risk fighting empty-handed war raids (balang kayau).
- The first time that a warrior takes a head or captures a prisoner, he must present the head or captive to the warleader in acknowledgement of the latter's leadership.
- If a warrior takes two heads or captives, or more, one of each must be given to the warleader; the remainder belongs to the killer or captor.
- The warleader must be honest with his followers in order that in future wars he may not be defeated (alah bunoh).

When considering a headhunting (ngayau) expedition, only an enemy shall be attacked. A guiltless tribe shall not be attacked and doing so shall result in an adverse curse called 'busong. Besides, the longhouse elders do not sanction any unwarranted provocation. The expedition must be conducted for good and the benefit of all inhabitants of the longhouse and the region. For example, a hostile enemy who attacks during farming or other routine activities can be eliminated for security and peace purposes after conflict resolution has failed. A surrendering enemy shall be not killed but taken as a slave who would be given chance to redeem themselves over time. Often, a male slave is commissioned to attack the enemy in return for his freedom and perhaps marrying a daughter of a chief who instructed him in the first place. Otherwise, the slave can plant a lot of paddy for his master in return for his freedom. A female slave can take care of the master's family especially his secludedly-raised daughter in a raised palace (meligai).

Among others, the Iban instituted a compensation custom called "adat pati nyawa' to pay the killed victim's relative, swapping of a slave or valuable jar to establish brotherhood agreement (bamboo madi) or a marriage to achieve settlement among the parties in dispute and peace in general. Hence, a headhunting is indeed a last resort. In fact, territorial disputes were the bulk of the causes of headtaking e.g. during a chance encounter between the wandering tribe and the local inhabitants which resulted in conflicts regarding ownership and conservation of forest resources. In other occasions, headhunting is usually performed on a traditional enemy who reciprocated the act from time to time. So, it is engaged in as a necessity for survival.

There is a set of rules used in engaging in headhunting between the leader and his followers. A usual procedure of headhunting starts when a group of warriors agree to go on a sojourn to an enemy country during the month of adventure (belelang) which is the period waiting for the paddy to grow and bear rice seeds before the harvesting season comes. Often, a junior warrior may go alone or in small group to attack an enemy by an element of surprise. Only a proven leader having seven heads to his credit can mobilize and lead a larger troop to raid a longhouse. A well-established leader with more than twenty one heads (three rings of skulls) can lead and wage a war against a region.

After defeating and severing a head, the winning warrior will shower himself in the fresh blood dripping from the enemy's severed head (mandi darah) while shouting triumphs of victory (panjung). He also puts the severed head on his shoulders. The taken heads shall then be presented to the leader who then decides whether the warrior can own the head or not. Usually, the first head taken by a warrior will be owned by the leader while the rest owns by the warrior. The same rules applies to live catch of enemy (tangkap) or taken goods. Severed heads will be smoked by the second in command. Upon reaching the longhouse, the warrior will shout in triumph to announce victory.

After obtaining the first three heads, a warrior and his longhouse can hold a ritual ceremony called 'enchaboh arong' to celebrate, honour and clean the taken head. The headtaking (ngayau) chief shall clean the smoked head in three steps: cutting off the hair for safekeeping and decorating the end of a sword handle, taking a small lump of the brain using the tip of his sword and puffing it into a lump of glutinous rice before eating it in one go, skinning off the skin and flesh using his sword, churning out the brain inside using a rattan to swirl out and stir the brain out of the skull in a flowing river water, making a rattan basket to keep the cleaned skull, drying the cleaned skull in sunlight for several days and smoking it during the night over a fire heath (bedilang) at the gallery (ruai). Once a warrior has obtained seven skulls, he can formally make a ring (bengkong) to hand his head trophies at the gallery for safekeeping and showcasing them. The skulls need to be ritually well-cared for and fed regularly as valuable possessions which were considered worth more than gold.

To be an effective warrior, the Iban invoke divine assistance by performing various ritual festivals in ascending order according to the warrior's accomplishment. The Iban likens their warrior's career path to the rung of the longhouse ladder until he reaches the pinnacle. Meanwhile, the women will indulge in their own war path in weaving a string of ritual cloths called 'pua kumbu' whose design motive is ideally one step ahead of the current achievement of his husband or son to inspire and motivate their men for more skulls.

== Warfare ==
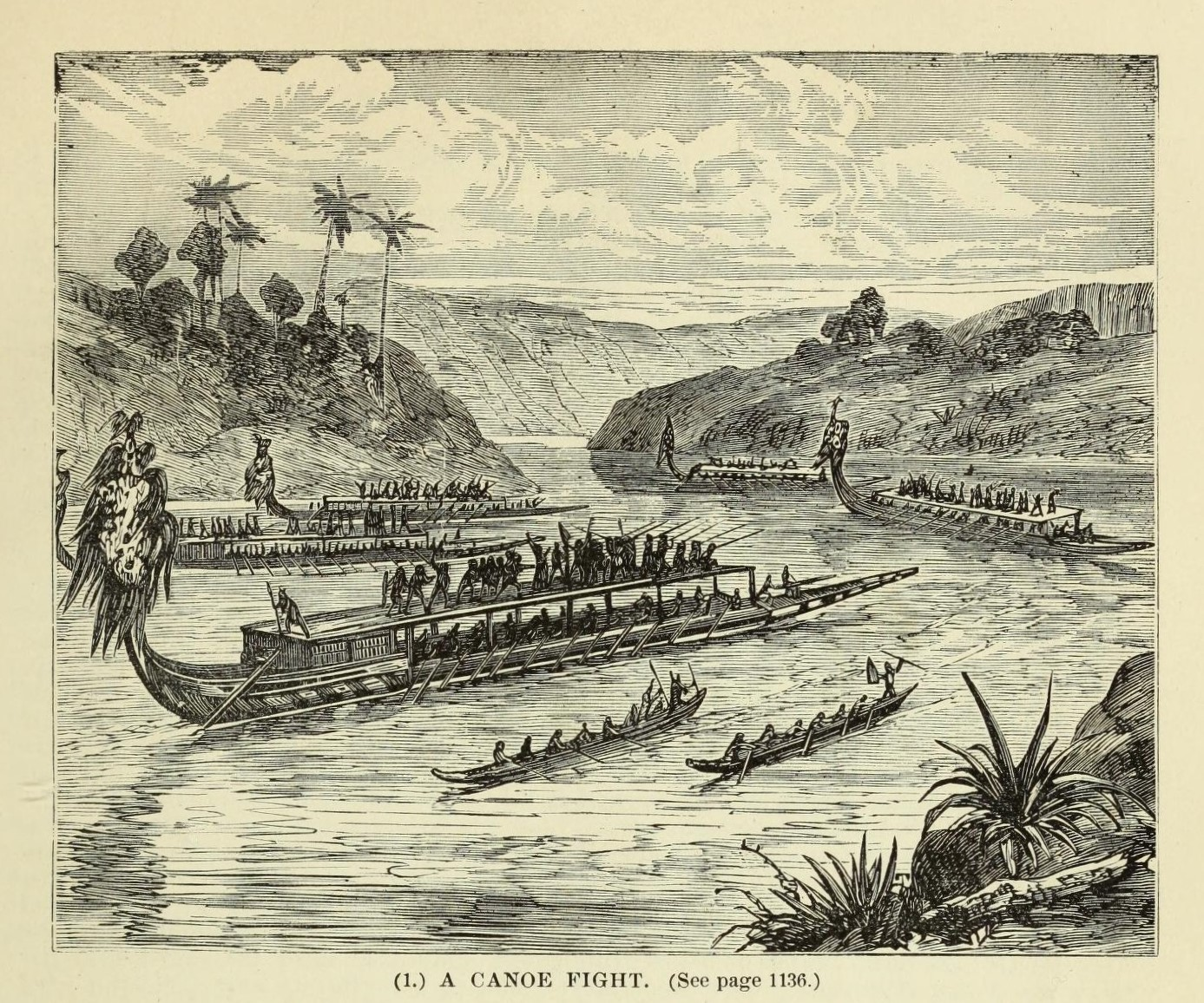
The bait and trap tactic of Sea Dayaks

The Sea Dayaks aka Ibans were embroiled in intertribal and intratribal warfare during their migration routes through the wilderness from Kapuas Delta to upper Kapuas and then crossing over to modern Sarawak. Thus, they, as their exonym given by James Brooke seemingly implies, are not originally a maritime set of tribes but a riverine one, and fight chiefly in canoes and boats during their resistance and rebellion against Brunei and its piratical tribes under Sulu, mainly Illanuns and Balangingis who make maritime expeditions around the island South East Asia Archipelago. One of their favorite tactics is to conceal some of their larger boats, and then to send some small and poorly manned canoes forward to attack the enemy to lure them into a trap. The canoes then retreat, followed by the enemy, and as soon as they passes the spot where the larger boats are hidden, the pursuing enemy boats are attacked from the rear, while the smaller canoes, which have acted as decoys, turn around and join in the fight. The rivers arc are chosen for this kind of attack, the overhanging branches of trees and the dense foliage of the bank affording excellent hiding places for the boats.

Many of the Sea Dayaks were also coastal raidings with navigation provided by renegade Brunei chiefs. In the 19th century there was a great deal of coastal raidings, and it was secretly encouraged by the Brunei rulers, who obtained a share of the spoil, and also by the Malays who knew well how to handle a boat. The coastal fleet consisted of a large number of long war boats or prahu, each about 90 feet (27 m) long or more, and carrying a brass gun in the bow, the raiders being armed with swords, spears and muskets. Each boat was paddled by from 60 to 80 men. These boats skulked about in the sheltered coves waiting for their prey, and attacked merchant vessels making the passage between China and Singapore. The Malay raiders and their Dayak allies would wreck and destroy every trading vessel they came across, murder most of the crew who offered any resistance, and the rest were made as slaves. The Dayak would cut off the heads of those who were slain, smoke them over the fire to dry them, and then take them home to treasure as valued possessions.

== Iban traditional musics ==
As from time immemorial, the people of the longhouse have been skilled in playing all kinds of gendang and gong music.

=== Drum music ===
There are three categories of long cylindrical drum music according to their purpose of play i.e. ritual, entertainment and shamanic.

One important and frequently played long cylindrical drum music performed by the Ibans is called gendang rayah. It is played only for religious festivals with the following instruments:

- The music from a first bendai gong is called pampat
- The music from a second bendai gong is called kaul
- The music from a third bendai gong is called kura
- As the three bendai gongs sound together, then a first tawak gong is beaten and is added to by the beating of another tawak gong to make the music.

The music is played using the katebong drums by one or up to eleven drummers performing at the same time. These drums are long and their cylinders are made from strong wood, such as tapang or mengeris and one of their ends are covered with a piece of animal skin such as that of a monkey and mousedeer or the skin of a monitor lizard. The major types of drum music are known as follows:

- Gendang Bebandong
- Gendang Lanjan
- Gendang Enjun Batang
- Gendang Tama Pechal
- Gendang Pampat
- Gendang Tama Lubang
- Gendang Tinggang Batang
- Singkam Nggam

All these types are played by drummers on the open air verandas during the celebration of the Gawai Burong festival. The Singkam Nggam music is accompanied by the quick beating of a beliong adze. After each of these types has been played, the drummers beat another music called sambi sanjan, which is followed by still another called tempap tambak pechal. To end the orchestral performance, the music of gendang bebandong is again beaten.

The ordinary types of music beaten by drummers for pleasure are as follows:

- Gendang Dumbang
- Gendang Ngang
- Gendang Ringka
- Gendang Enjun Batang
- Kechendai Inggap Diatap
- Gendang Kanto

When a Gawai Manang or bebangun festival is held for a layman to be consecrated as a manang (shaman), the following music must be beaten on the ketebong drums at the open veranda (tanju) of the longhouse of the initiate:

- Gendang Dudok
- Gendang Rueh
- Gendang Kelakendai
- Gendang Tari
- Gendang Naik
- Gendang Po Umboi
- Gendang Sembayan
- Gendang Layar
- Gendang Bebandong
- Gendang Nyereman

Gendang Bebandong also must be beaten when a manang dies and is beaten again when his coffin is lowered from the open air verandah (tanju) to the ground below on its way to the cemetery for burial.

=== Taboh music ===
One Iban writer briefly describes the rhythms of taboh music played the Iban's brass band orchestra which translates as "The number of musicians to play taboh music is four ie one playing the bebendai (small gong) which is beaten first of all to determine the rhythm of the taboh, responded to by the gendang or dedumbak drum, followed by the tawak (big gong) and finalized by the engkerumong set."

To the laymen's ears, the rhythms of taboh music for ngajat dance is only two i.e. fast or slow but actually it has four types namely Ayun Lundai (slow swing), Ai Anyut (flowing water), Sinu Ngenang (sad remembrance) and Tanjak Ai (against the water flow). The first three taboh types are slow to accompany the ajat semain (group dance), ajat iring (accompanying dance) and ajat kelulu (comedial dance). The fourth rhythm of taboh is fast which is suitable for the ajat bebunoh (killing dance).

Other rhythms of taboh music are tinggang punggung for ngambi indu (taking the bride for wedding) and taboh rayah (rayah music) for ngerandang and ngelalau jalai (pathway clearing and fencing dance).

== Ngajat dance ==
There are about four categories of Iban traditional ngajat dance according to their respective functional purpose i.e. showmanship, ritual, comedial and self-defence. These are described below:

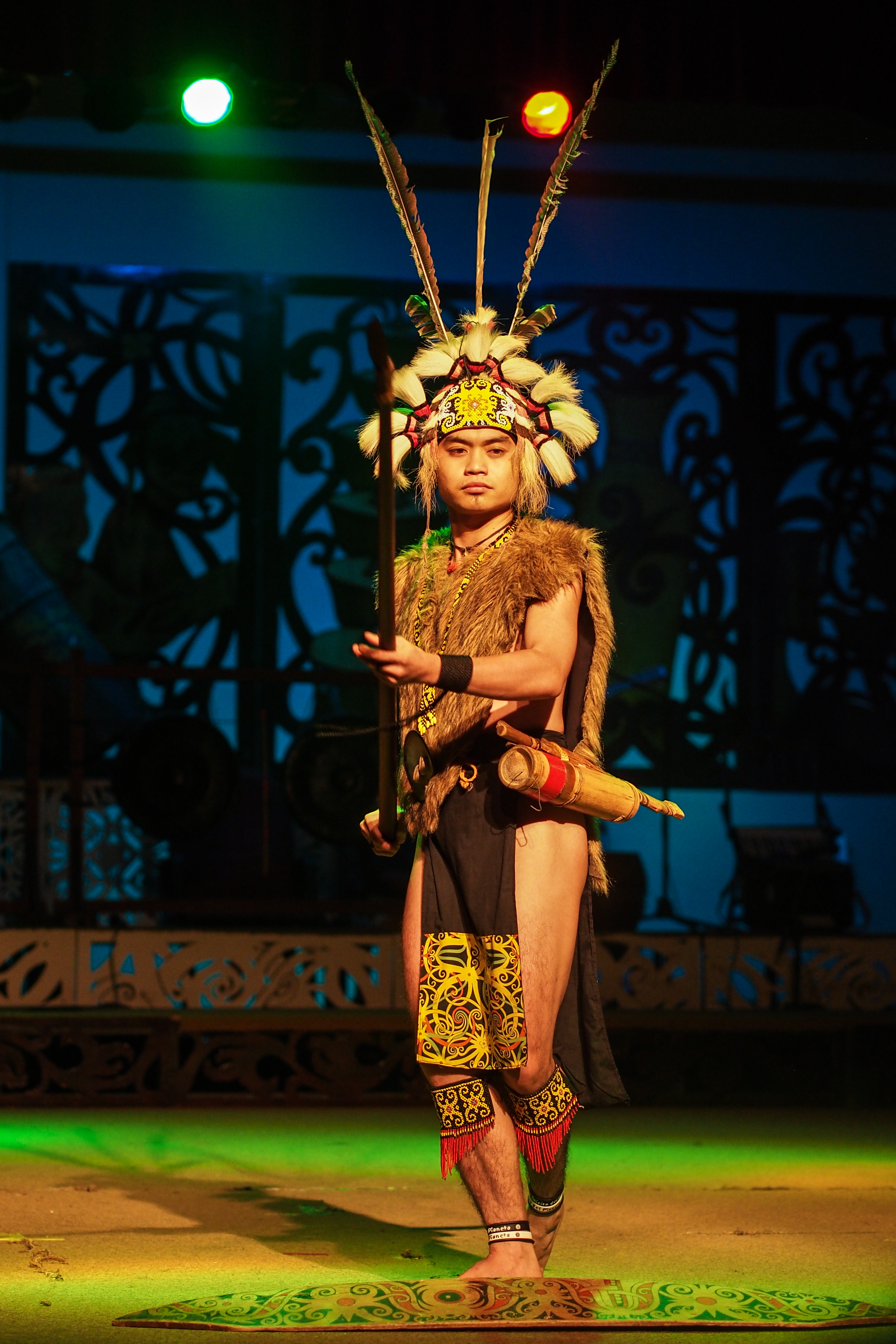
An Iban warrior in their traditional dress.

=== Showmanship dance ===
- Ngajat ngalu temuai (welcoming dance) by a group of females
- Ngajat indu (female dance)
- Ngajat pua kumbu (a female dance with a woven blanket which is most likely woven by herself)
- Ngajat lelaki (male dance)
- Ngajat lesung (rice mortar dance)
- Ngajat pinggai ngau kerubong strum (dance with one rice ceramic plate held on each palm while tapping the plates with an empty bullet shell inserted into the middle fingers of both hands)
- Ngajat bujang berani ngena terabai ngau ilang (warrior dance with full costume, a shield and sword)
- Ngajat bebunoh (hand combat dance normally between two male dancers)
- Ngajat nanka kuta (fort defence dance)
- Ngajat semain laki ngau indu (dance by a group of men and ladies)
- Ngajat niti papan (dance by a group of men and ladies on a raised up wooden plank)
- Ngajat atas tawak (dance on top of gongs by ladies with gentlemen in the background)
- Ngajat ngalu pengabang (dance by a man with several ladies behind who lead the procession of guests during festivals)

These types of dance can be performed either on an open space or around the pun ranyai which is the tree of life

=== Ritual dance ===
- Ngajat panggau libau as a group of men with a sword and isang leaves.
- Ngerandang jalai (pathway-clearing), ngelalau jalai (pathway fencing)
- Berayah pupu buah rumah (longhouse contribution collection)
- Berayah ngelilingi pun sabang ngau tiang chandi gawai (dancing around the festival ritual pole)
- Naku antu pala (welcoming human heads)
- Naku pentik kenyalang (welcoming hornbill statue)

=== Comedial dance ===
- Ngajat kera (monkey dance)
- Ngajat muar kesa(stinging Ants' nest collection)
- Ngajat matak wi (rattan pulling dance)
- Ngajat nyumpit (blowpiping dance)
- Ngajat bekayuh (paddling dance)
- Ngajat mabuk (drunk dance)
- Ngajat bunyan baka lari maya ngasu (running scared dance e.g. scared of animals while hunting)
- Ngajat ngelusu berapi, beribunka anak ngau nutok (lazy woman dance)
- Ngajat pama (frog dance)
- Ngajat gerasi tunsang (upside down huntsman dance)
- Ngajat tempurung nyor (coconut shell dance)
- Ngajat turun tupai (squirrel going down dance)
- Ngajat jelu bukai (other animal mimicking dance)

=== Self-defence dance ===
- Bekuntau (self-defence dance)
- Bepenca (martial art dance)
- Main kerichap
- Main chekak

According to one Iban writer, when a warrior performs the ajat bebunoh dance with the music of a gendang panjai orchestra, he does it as if he is fighting against an enemy. With occasional shouts he raises his shield with one arm and swings his ilang knife with his other arm as he moves towards the enemy. While he moves forward he is careful with the steps of his feet to guard them from being cut by his foe. The tempo of his action is very fast with his knife and shield gleaming up and down as he dances.

The man dance has various unique moves such as minta ampun (apologising to guests first), showing skills of playing with the sword and the shield, biting the sword in the mouth for affirming his strength, balancing the sword over his shoulder while still dancing, engkajat (fast foot movement to distract the attention of the enemy), running forward with the sword pointed towards the enemy and shouting war cries to strike the enemy and finally the glory of holding the enemy's freshly chopped head. The enemy head may be symbolised by a coconut which is hung beforehand on the tree of life and the ending move is apologising to the guests again.

The performance of ajat semain is done in slower tempo, accompanied with dancers swinging back and forth with slow hand movements. The performance of the ngajat nanggong lesong dance is more or less akin to the ajat semain dance. The dancer would bite and raise the heavy wooden mortar (lesong) with his teeth, then he places it back on the floor.

When the dancers take the floor to dance, the musicians beat two dumbak drums, a bendai gong, a set of seven small gongs (engkerumong) and a large tawak gong. The music for the performance of ajat bebunoh dance is quicker in tempo than the music for the ajat semain and ajat nanggong lesong dances, as in the dance itself.

== Poetry ==
The recitation of pantun and various kinds of leka main (traditional poetry) is a particularly important aspect of festivals. Any ordinary person can recite poetry for entertainment and customary purposes but sacred inchantations to invoke deities are only recited by specialists which are either a manang (shaman) or lemambang (bard) or tukang sabak.

According one Iban scholar, the leka main (poems, proses and folklores) for Iban Dayaks can be categorised into three major groups i.e. leka main pemerindang (for entertaining purposes), leka main adat basa (for customary purposes) and leka main invokasyen (for invocation purposes).

=== Entertainment ===
The entertaining leka main includes:

- pantun
- jawang
- sanggai
- ramban
- entelah (riddle)
- ensera (plain story)
- kana (sung story)
- pelandai ara
- pelandai karong
- wak anat mit (lullaby).

=== Customary ===
The customary leka main comprises:

- jaku ansah (instroductory/invitational speech)
- jaku geliga (rule and fine speech)
- tanya indu (asking the lady for marriage)
- muka kuta (ceremonial stockade opening)
- muka kujuk (food coverage opening)
- jaku karong (speech with hidden meanings)
- jaku dalam (deep speech)
- jaku sempama (exemplary speech)
- jaku silup (speech with inter-twined meanings)
- sugi semain
- renong semain
- renong ngayap (courting) etc.

=== Invocation ===
The invocation leka main consists of:

- sampi (prayer)
- biau (cleansing)
- denjang (blessing)
- renong sabong
- renong kayau
- timang (chanting by a group of lemambang bards)
- pengap (chanting by a group of lemambang bards)
- pelian
- sugi sakit
- renong sakit
- sabak bebuah or sungkop or rugan (dirge)

These invocatory inchantations must be accompanied with piring (ritual offerings) to appease the gods invoked during the festival. The inchantation can last the whole night of the festival and the next morning a pig is sacrificed for divination of its liver which is interpreted to forecast the luck, fortune, health and success of the feast host and his family in the future.

== Traditional possessions ==
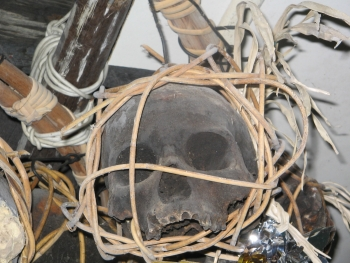
Pala Antu, a headhunting trophy skull of the Ibans, photographed in an Iban longhouse in the Betong Division in Sarawak, Malaysia. The skull is about 100 years old.

Head Skull

The Ibans used to regard human skulls (called antu pala) obtained during headhunting raids (ngayau) as their most prized trophy and possession.

Jar

The Ibans treasure jars which are called benda or tajau which include, pasu, salang-alang, alas, rusa, menaga, ningka, sergiu, pereni and guchi. Possession of these jars mark someone's wealth and any fines may be paid using benda or tajau in the old days and presently used nowadays as part of upah (pay) for bards and shamans.

Brassware

Iban strive to own a full set of brass musical instruments which comprises a tawak (gong), bendai (snare), engkurumong (small gong) and bedup (drum).

Paddy

Getting a lot of paddy used to be highly regarded and perhaps an indication of wealth.

Shaman and bard

Having a manang shaman and lemambang bards is also regarded necessary possession with the Iban riverine community. This practice used to be to have one set per river tributary, if not per a longhouse. Nowadays, obtaining educational degrees is foremost in the Iban minds e.g. the target is to have a degree graduate per family bilek within a longhouse.

Land

The Iban aims to own land as much as possible via berumpang menua (jungle clearing) before when fresh jungles were still available in abundance. Therefore, the Ibans were willing to migrate to new areas. Before the arrival of James Brooke, the Iban had migrated from Kapuas to Saribas and Skrang, Batang Ai, Sadong, Samarahan, Katibas, Kapit and Baleh in order to own fress tracks of jungles among the reasons. Some Ibans participated in Brooke-led punitive expeditions against their own countrymen in exchange for areas to migrate to.

Longhouse

Many Iban still believes in the necessity and importance of living in longhouses rather single-houses within a kampong village e.g. during gatherings, meetings, farming and festivals.

Defence weaponry

Iban males will have a set of war weaponry which include a knife, a terabai shield, a blowpipe, a sangkoh spear and a baju gagong (tough animal skin shirt). In addition, the Iban will look for charms called pengaroh, empelias, pengerabun, etc.

Longboat

Each Iban family will own at least one long boat for transportation along rivers.

== Modernized culture ==
Head taking has been prohibited a long time ago while the traditional belief system of the Iban has been replaced by new religions. In view of this, the Iban institutes a modernized version of their culture. For example, the main activity nowadays is obtaining education instead of farming and head taking. The progress in obtaining the ascending levels of education has been likened to the ascension in the career path of traditional farming and head taking. For example, obtaining a bachelor's degree or holding executive positions is regarded as equivalent to obtaining several heads which qualifies the bachelor holders to be called 'bujang or dara berani' (brave bachelor or bachelorette). A master's degree holder is ranked to be qualified as a raid leader (tau kayau) or holding middle management posts. The PhD degree holder is qualified to be a war leader (tau serang) or top management heads.

Likewise, all traditional Iban rituals can be replaced by equivalent Christian prayer sessions. It is not necessary to replace the Iban cultural system with that of the Western as performed by Jesus Christ in the Bible. The Iban cultural, language, literature, adat customary law and augury and way of life system form the foundation of the Iban's own identity and religion.
