= Juan Materno Vásquez de León =

Panamanian public speaker, lawyer and professor

Juan Materno Vásquez de León (born September 14, 1927 in Nombre de Dios - died June 21, 1999) was a Panamanian public speaker, lawyer and professor.

His intellectual work was centered on defining the Nature of Being Panamanian. In more than 20 books, television and radio interviews throughout 30 years of public life Juan Materno Vásquez de León's closest definition of a Panamanian was given in the terms of "the Panamanian is that being that is neither black, neither white, neither cholo, neither indio; to the contrary, he is black, white, cholo and Indian."
