= Juan el de la Vara =

Spanish flamenco singer (born 1938)

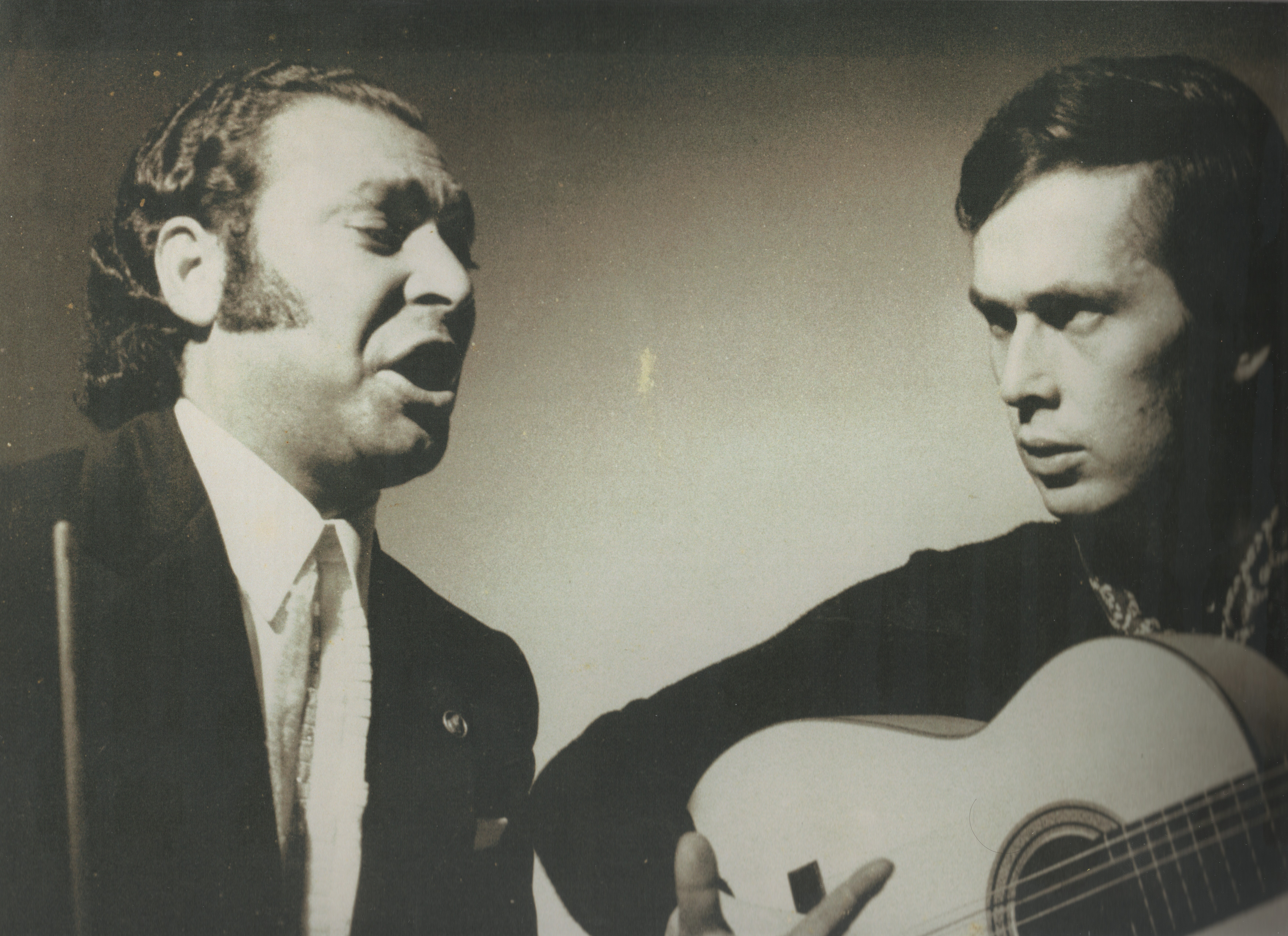
Juan el de la Vara with Paco de Lucía in the early 1970s

Juan el de la Vara (born 1938 in Barcelona) is a Spanish flamenco singer. He has worked with numerous artists, including Paco de Lucía.
