= Juan Pérez Medina =

Mexican politicians and educator

- Born: 20 October 1960 (age 65); Nayarit, Mexico
- Occupations: Politician and educator
- Political party: PRD

Juan Pérez Medina (born 20 October 1960) is a Mexican politician and educator affiliated with the Party of the Democratic Revolution. As of 2014 he served as Deputy of the LIX Legislature of the Mexican Congress as a plurinominal representative.
