= Juan Diego (name) =

Juan Diego is a Spanish compound name which may refer to many people, Including:

- Juan Diego (actor) (1942–2022), a Spanish actor
- Juan Diego Angeloni (born 1978), an Argentine rifle shooter
- Juan Diego Bernardino (1460–1544), one of two Aztec peasants alleged to have had visions of the Virgin Mary as Our Lady of Galupe
- Juan Diego Botto (born 1975), Argentine-Spanish actor
- Juan Diego Covarrubias (born 1987), a Mexican actor
- Juan Diego del Castillo (1744–1793), Spanish pharmacist and botanist
- Juan Diego Flórez (born 1973), a Peruvian opera singer
- Juan Diego González Alzate (born 1980), Colombian footballer
- Juan Diego Gonzalez-Vigil (born 1985), Peruvian footballer
- Juan Diego Madrigal (born 1986), Costa Rican footballer
- Juan Diego Ramírez (born 1971), road cyclist from Colombia
- Juan Diego Solanas (born 1966), Argentine film director
- Saint Juan Diego (1474–1548), the first indigenous American saint
- Juan Diego Ramirez (officer) (1710–1737), officer in the Spanish-Portuguese War
