= Jwan =

Jwan (Sorani Kurdish: جوان) is a gender-neutral given name, which means "pretty" in Kurdish Sorani language.

It may refer to:

- Jwan Hajo or Ciwan Haco (born 1957), Kurdish singer
- Jwan Hesso (born 1982), Syrian football player
- Jwan Yosef (born 1984), Syrian Swedish artist in painting and plastic arts

== See also ==
- Joan
- Juan
- Juwan
