= New Madrid =

New Madrid may refer to:

- New Madrid County, Missouri, a county in the U.S. state of Missouri
- New Madrid, Missouri, a city in New Madrid County
- New Madrid Seismic Zone, a major seismic zone in Missouri, Tennessee, and Arkansas
  - New Madrid earthquake, a series of four earthquakes that occurred in late 1811 and early 1812
- "New Madrid" (song), by Uncle Tupelo from their 1993 album Anodyne
- New Madrid, a literary journal published by Murray State University
- Birds Point-New Madrid Floodway
