= Juan Catalino Domínguez =

Argentine serial killer

- Born: May 4, 1910; Rauch, Argentina
- Died: April 18, 1948 (aged 37); General Madariaga, Argentina
- Cause of death: Ballistic trauma
- Other names: Donato Aguirre; Pedro Montenegro; Pedro Aguirre

Details
- Victims: 8
- Span of crimes: 1944–1948
- Country: Argentina
- State: Buenos Aires

Juan Catalino Domínguez (May 4, 1910 – April 18, 1948) was an Argentine ranch hand, outlaw and serial killer who, in-between several prison escapes from 1944 to 1948, killed eight people before being gunned down by the Buenos Aires provincial police in a gunfight.

== Background ==
Juan Catalino Domínguez was born in the small town of Rauch on May 4, 1910. Little is known of his early life, but by 1933, he began to commit thefts in the rural areas of Ayacucho and Coronel Vidal. From 1940 to 1943, he was incarcerated for an altercation that occurred in Mar del Plata, where he had worked as a chauffeur.

By 1944, Catalino worked as caretaker of a luxiourous residence in La Loma de Stella Maris neighborhood of Mar del Plata, living there with his 18-year-old wife Isabel (née Criado) and their little daughter, Marta. In spite of their financial situation, he hosted a friend of him, Rafael Luchetti, at his house. One day, however, he found his wife having sex with their guest. Upon this discovery, Luchetti drew a revolver on Catalino, who in turn tried to defend himself by punching him, only to be shot in the leg. While he was writhing in pain, Luchetti took Isabel and Marta in a car and drove off. The badly wounded Catalino was soon found and taken to a nearby hospital, where he spent some time recovering from his wounds.

== First murders ==
After his release from hospital, Catalino was hellbent on killing Luchetti, going so far as to stalk his mother's house in the town of Dolores, assuming that at one point he would come and visit her. There, he lived in a small shed on the outskirts of the city and made a living by doing odd jobs for a man named Jaime Casanova, while frequenting the home of two neighbors - widow Gregoria Rosas (the mother of Luchetti) and her common-law husband, Narciso Peñalba.

One night, Catalino came across the couple and fiercely demanded that they tell him where Luchetti was, thinking that his wife and daughter were still with him. When neither of them gave a satisfactory answer, the enraged man pulled out a knife and started viciously stabbing and kicking both of them. Still dazed by his own rage, Catalino dragged the corpses to a nearby haystack, where he hid them and promptly left.

== Capture and escapes ==
Once the murders were discovered, police diligently searched for the perpetrator until they found Catalino hiding in a hotel in the city of Mendoza. Offering no resistance, he was quickly arrested by two guards and scheduled for transportation to La Plata. While passing through the town of Pergamino, Catalino feigned sickness and was allowed to get out the car and take off his handcuffs to relieve himself. After he went into the cornfield by the roadside, Catalino took off his coat and left it hanging on some plants in view of the guards, who patiently waited for his return.

On April 20, 1945, Catalino was located in Mar del Plata, on a farm on 1526 Rodríguez Peña Street, as he had learned that his daughter was living in the city. He was surprised by police - who had been waiting for him for months - and opened fire on them with his gun, but was hit in the left leg by commissioner García. Catalino attempted to flee, but fractured his femur in the process, and was recaptured. He was again sent to the hospital and kept under surveillance, but one night, he asked the guard to remove the handcuffs so he could go the bathroom. Once again, he managed to escape by climbing out of the bathroom window to the roof and then jumped out into the garden. From there, he went into the streets, where he stole a bicycle and sped away into the stormy night, in spite of having a gangrenous infection on his wound.

== Azul murders ==
While police searched for him in Rio Negro and the Neuquén Province, Catalino returned to Dolores, where Luchetti, Isabel and Marta were currently residing. As he was about to take his revenge, Luchetti and Isabel fled, leaving Marta behind. Pursued by the local and federal police, Catalino and his daughter travelled frequently around the countryside to work odd jobs, with him using various aliases to lie low.

Eventually, he found himself in a rural area of Azul, and using the alias Donato Aguirre, he left his daughter at the owners' boarding house, exclaiming that he was unable to take care of her by himself. On June 28, 1947, Catalino was found loitering in a field near a ranch in Cuartel IX by a ranch hand named Braulio Leguizamón, whom he bludgeoned to death. After climbing up a hill with the man's body in tow, Catalino hid it among a pile of bags and old rags. In the meantime, alerted by the landlords, the police located and questioned his daughter, quickly establishing her true identity. As a result, she was immediately taken away and placed in an orphanage, the Hogar del Buen Pastor.

On July 8, Catalino, who had found employment as a ranch hand in Chillar, learned that his true identity had been discovered by his employer Guillermo Alberti. Shortly after, he went to the kitchen where, without saying a word, he shot to death both Alberti and another ranch hand, Victoriano Serrano. After he hid Alberti's body under some metal sheets, Catalino tied Serrano's body to a horse and traveled to a pit, where he then dumped it.

Sheltered by the darkness of the icy roads in a small cabin, he prowled around town at night searching for his daughter. However, while loitering around an boy's orphanage, Catalino was spotted by a police commissioner, causing to immediately ride out of town. For the next several days, he wandered in the vicinity, but the strict surveillance prevented him going back in. As a result, Catalino was forced to leave Azul for good.

== Final murders ==
Now calling himself Pedro Montenegro or Aguirre, Catalino committed a series of robberies and thefts in Tandil, Rauch, Dolores, El Tordillo, General Juan Madariaga and the surrounding area, before returning to Mar del Plata and settling in the La Juanita neighborhood. He then moved to Colonia Barragán, near Estación Cobo, where he stayed with his neighbor Bienvenido Basualdo, a farmer and renowned cow herder.

On March 7, 1948, in the rural area of El Trio, on the northern environs of General Pueyrredón Partido (a few miles west of Estacion Camet), Catalino found himself on the farm of the Mehatz family, for whom he had worked previously as a gardener, under the assumed name of Pedro Aguirre. Taking advantage of their absence due to it being election day, he and a 17-year-old accomplice named Orlando Nelson Rosas (or Alberto Gómez), an escapee from a juvenile detention facility, decided to rob the place.

Unexpectedly, the Mehatzes returned to the farm because some of them had forgotten their voting papers. The first to enter the house was Martín (a senior employee in Mar del Plata's Casino Central), whom Catalino shot three times. His sons, 22-year-old Martín Mayo and 19-year-old Marcelo, tried to flee, but the former was shot in the back, causing him to fall on the ground, before Catalino unloaded the rest of his revolver's chamber into him. Marcelo run for his life, but he was eventually cornered against a fence, while shouting "What is wrong with you, Aguirre?", unaware of his true identity. With no bullets left, Catalino took out a knife and slit Marcelo's throat, but as he was taking too long to die, Rosas gave him a mace with which he crushed his head.

The pair then loaded the bodies into the family car and traveled to General Juan Madariaga, dumping the bodies on the field of farmer Ángel Casales. They then tried to hide the car by "burying" it in the forest, but they simply covered it with firewood and branches, then left.

== Exposure and death ==
After the murders, Domínguez went to work in La Eudocia, taking on farm work for Juan Carlos Pétersen. However, while reading the news about the Mehatz family murders one morning, Mrs. Pétersen realized that the farm hand was indeed Domínguez and informed police. Before they could arrest him, however, he had already fled.

In early April 1948, General Madariaga's commissioner Pedro Cavanna received a complaint from a man named Pedro Jaureguiberry, saying that he had been robbed by a man who was riding "a sulky with red wheels". Determined to catch the criminal, Cavanna, together with Corporal José M. Diuberti and watchman Raymundo Manrique, went to the La Espadaña field of General Madariaga in the early morning hours of April 18.

There, they questioned the man in charge of the post, Enrique Merlo, who claimed that there was nobody else in his house. However, the commissioner noticed that a sulky with the characteristics described by Jaureguiberry was parked at the back of the farm, prompting him and his men to start searching the property. Suddenly, an unknown man appeared, took cover, pulled out a revolver and opened fired on them. Almost immediately, the officers fired at him with their Winchester rifles, hitting the individual with four fatal shots and killing him instantly. The man was then quickly identified as Juan Catalino Domínguez, who was apparently sleeping on the farm before being startled by the officers' arrival.

Not long after his death, Rosas was caught in a nearby ranch and imprisoned for his participation in the crimes. Set free after a short term in prison, he continued his criminal career until he himself was killed sometime during the earlier 1960s. Catalino's daughter, Marta, was transferred to La Plata and later to an institute in Ingeniero Maschwitz, where she remained until adulthood.

== See also ==
- List of serial killers by country
