= Madridejos =

Madridejos may refer to the following places:

- Madridejos, Cebu, Philippines
- Madridejos, Toledo, Spain
