= Miring (ritual) =

Iban traditional ritual

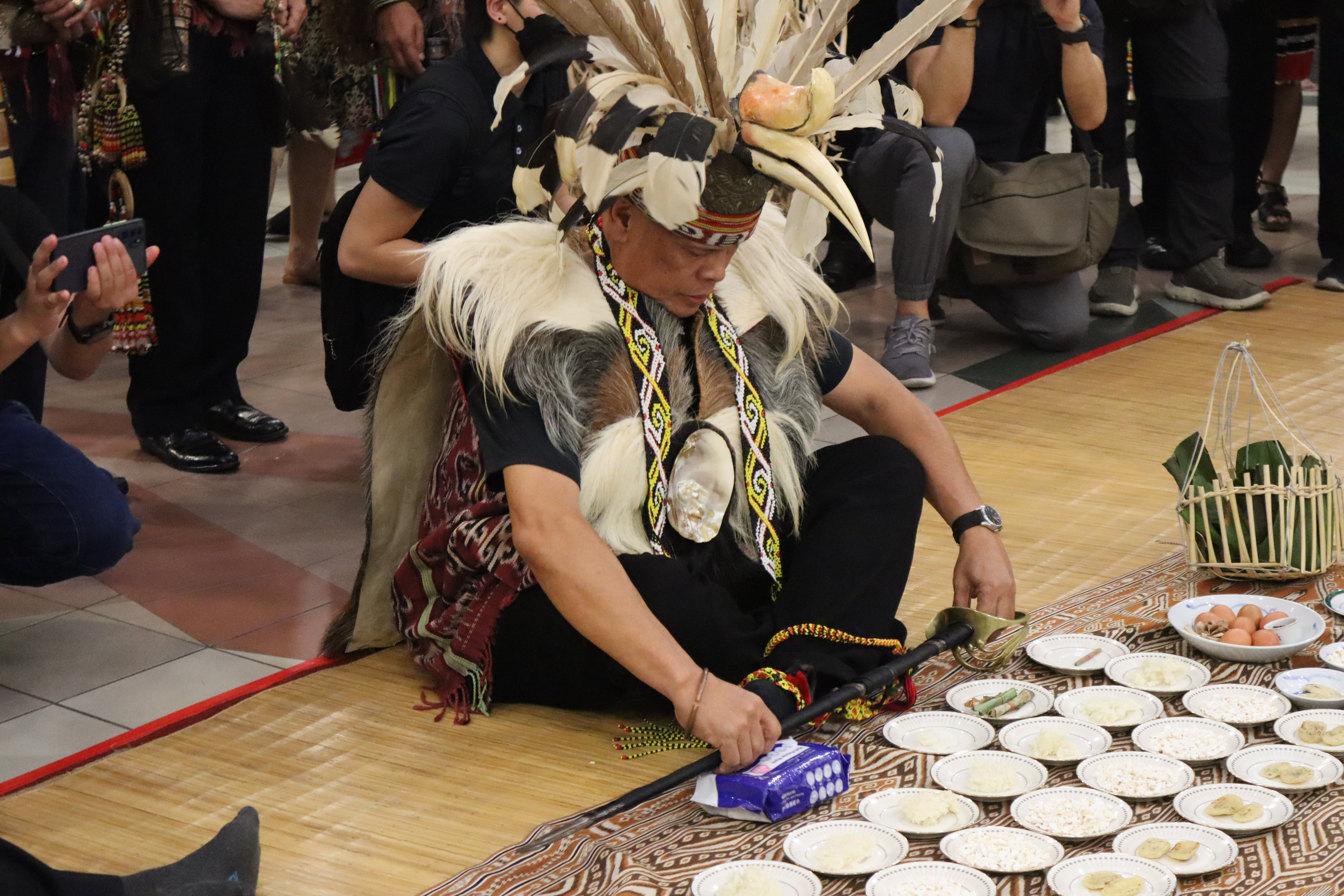
Miring ceremony before the start of the Niti Daun Gawai Dayak 2023 event in Kuching, Sarawak.

Miring is a traditional ritual performed by the Iban people to give honor to Petara (God), Orang Panggau & Bunsu Antu (spirits) and Petara Aki Ini (dead ancestors). The act of miring is a type of religious ritual conducted based on the belief in seeking assistance from Petara to realize a specific wish by presenting offerings such as food arranged on plates (piring). Hence, the name of the practise is derived from the word "piring", where miring means "to make offerings with plates".

== Descriptions ==
The ritual equipment for the miring is the pua kumbu, seregang or kelingkang (fish trap made of bamboo), teresang ("bamboo holders"), tray, bowl and plate. In the miring ceremony, plate offerings are usually presented in multiples of three, multiples of five, multiples of seven and multiples of nine, according to the intentions or aim. For example, plate offerings in the multiples of three is prepared for people with nightmares or to prepare the farmers before doing agricultural works. Plate offerings in the multiple of five is done before construction of a rumah panjai (longhouse), while the multiple of seven is done before bejalai (long-distance travelling tradition). The highest number, the offerings in the multiple of nine is prepared before a war.

Each ingredient is separated or divided into the number of plates. A rooster is the sacrificed, and the blood of the slaughtered rooster is then applied to the palm of the hand using rooster feathers. The chicken feathers are then placed on a plate. For the multiple of five and above, a pig is sacrificed instead.

This ritual cannot be performed by regular people but only a group of spell readers called lemambang. It is believed that the supernatural powers could not be handled by regular people.

=== Offering of food ===
The offering dish consists of white and black glutinous rice, white rice, palm cigarettes, tobacco, boiled eggs, betel and areca nut, salt, cooking oil, and letup (popped rice). The ingredients must be doused with tuak first before being wrapped and stored in a fish trap.

== Cultural significance ==
The existence of miring ritual is associated with the legend of Pulang Gana and the beginnings of rice cultivation practices within the Iban community. According to Iban oral folklore, Pulang Gana is the God of Rice. Aware of his power, the Iban turned to him for advice on rice farming. He advised them to present offerings such as tajau, bracelets, snail shells, and beads, which were symbolically manifested in food gifts.

Since the ritual is considered as a way of communication between humans and the spirit, miring ritual are typically conducted by the Iban people to pay respect to the spirits and ancestors who have departed. This is because the Iban people believes in the presence of spirits in humans, insects, animals, plants, birds, insects and other natural phenomena. They also believes that sounds made by birds can serve as warnings, signs, or messages that influence their fate before they engage in their daily tasks. Along with bird sounds, they also consider other signs like falling branches, dreams, and the ground, among others.

Furthermore, miring serves to express hopes for achievement in the areas they are engaged in. When individuals encounter different challenges in their lives, they must carry out the miring ceremony to request guidance from the spirits. However, if the miring ceremony is not executed properly, it may result in negative consequences for those participating in the ceremony.

== In modern days ==
Due to the conversion of Iban people to Abrahamic religions like Christianity and also Islam, this practice is discontinued by most of the modern generations. However, several people among the Iban community still practise this ritual, as a way to protect the right of the indigenous land, or to find a missing person. These people often practise this ritual in a syncretistic way to maintain this cultural heritage.
