= Juan Esteban Fagetti =

Uruguayan anarchist, writer, poet, journalist and soldier

Juan Esteban Fagetti (3 August 1888 – 14 August 1954) was a Uruguayan writer, poet, journalist and soldier.

== Biography ==
Esteban Fagetti was born on 3 August 1883 in Paysandú, Uruguay.

In 1903, Esteban Fagetti joined the army and took part in the battle of Masoller where the general Aparicio Saravia died. After being discharged from the army in 1906, Esteban Fagetti lived in Montevideo where he became involved with the Juventud Literaria del Uruguay (Uruguayan Literary Youth) movement, which the writer Montiel Ballesteros led. Esteban Fagetti then took up residency in Buenos Aires where he met the poet Baldomero Fernández Moreno and became the director of the magazines Lira Porteña and La Cruzada which were connected to anarchist ideas. Esteban Fagetti was self-taught. In 1919, he participated in a writing contest where he won first place for the work Canto al Uruguay under the pseudonym Alzaga.

Returning to Paysandú, he became the director of two Partido Colorado (Colorado Party) political newspapers Diario Moderno and La Razón. He won several awards for his poetry in Montevideo as in the rest of the country. Among others, he published the books: Pueblo Chico (1927), Piropos a Buenos Aires (1943), San Ramón (1945) and Tesis Lírica (1950).

In 1983, Fernando O. Lahitte published an anthology of Esteban Fagetti's poetry.

== Selected works ==
- Palique del momento (Buenos Aires, 1909)
- Lo de siempre (Buenos Aires, La Lionesa, 1912)
- Élitros (Montevideo, Ed. de la Juventud Literaria, 1914)
- Mediodía (Paysandú, Ed. Paysandú, 1916)
- Pueblo chico (Paysandú, Ed. by Diario Moderno, 1927)
- Policiales, versos escandalosos (Paysandú, 1930)
- La tierra de Leandro Gómez - dramatic poem (Paysandú, 1942)
- Piropos a Buenos Aires (Buenos Aires, Soiza Reilly, 1943)
- San Ramón (Paysandú, Ed. Paysandú, 1945)
- Tesis Lírica (para el doctorado de lo intemporal) (Paysandú, 1950)
- Antología poética (compilation of unpublished poems. Montevideo. Ed. by Fernando O. Lahilte, 1983)

== Works about Esteban Fagetti ==
- D.L.Bordoli, Antología de la poesía uruguaya contemporánea, Montevideo, Universidad de la República, 1966.
- G. De Freitas, "Fagetti oficializado", en Marcha, Montevideo, N° 1072, 24/8/ 61.
- F.O.Lahitte, estudio biocrítico en Antología poética de J.E.F., Montevideo, 1983.
- A. Rama, "Fagetti: amor y rencor en Paysandú" en Marcha, Montevideo, N° 1198, 20/3/64.
- P. Rocca, "Memoria de Juan E. Fagetti: De la aldea a la poesía", en El País Cultural, Montevideo, N° 237, 20/5/94.
- P. Rocca, "Las rupturas del discurso poético (de la vanguardia y sus cuestionamientos, 1920-1940)", en Historia de la literatura uruguaya contemporánea, Tomo II, Montevideo, Ediciones de la Banda Oriental, 1997.
