= Juwan =

Juwan is a given name. It may refer to:

- Juwan Brescacin (born 1993), Canadian football player
- Juwan Chung (born 1983), American film director
- Juwan Green (born 1998), American football player
- Juwan Howard (born 1973), American basketball player
- Juwan Johnson (born 1996), American football player
- Juwan Fuad Masum (born 1970), Iraqi politician
- Juwan Morgan (born 1997), American basketball player
- Juwan Simpson (born 1984), Canadian football player
- Juwan Staten (born 1992), American basketball player
- Juwan Thompson (born 1992), American football player
- Juwann Winfree (born 1996), American football player

== See also ==
- Jwan (disambiguation), a disambiguation page for "Jwan"
- Juan, a page for people with the given name "Juan"
