= Iban Iriondo =

Spanish cyclist

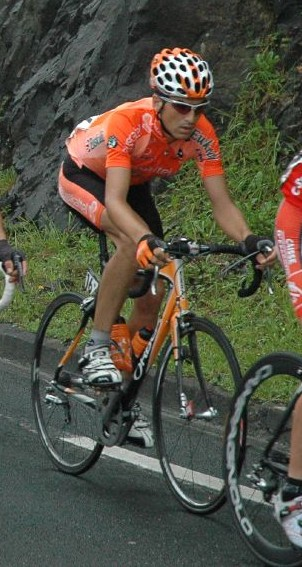

Personal information
- Full name: Iban Iriondo Uranga
- Born: May 1, 1984 (age 42) Zumaia, Spain

Cycling career
- Sport: Cycling
- Current team: Retired
- Discipline: Road
- Role: Rider

Professional team
- 2006–2007: Euskaltel–Euskadi

Iban Iriondo Uranga (born May 1, 1984 in Zumaia, Basque Country) is a Spanish former professional road bicycle racer, who rode professionally in 2006 and 2007 for the Euskaltel–Euskadi team.
