= Juan de los Santos Madriz y Cervantes =

Costa Rican politician (1785–1852)

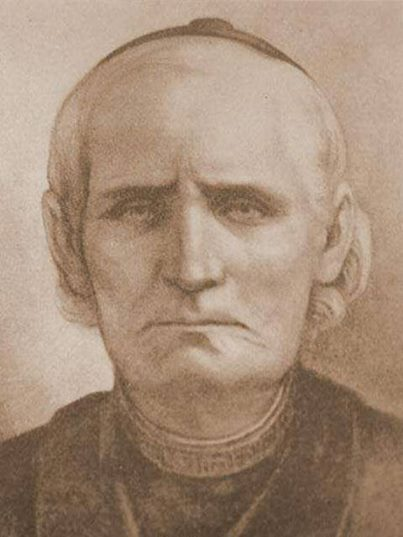
Juan de los Santos Madriz y Cervantes

Juan de los Santos Madriz y Cervantes (November 1, 1785 – August 8, 1852) was a Costa Rican politician, priest, educator, and signer of the Costa Rican declaration of independence.

He was born in Bagaces, Costa Rica, on 1 November 1785. His parents were Jose Francisco Garcia and Maria Candelaria Madriz Cervantes Ramirez.

He studied for the priesthood in León, Nicaragua. He returned to Costa Rica, and was eventually in charge of several parishes, including the parish of San José.
