= Joan (given name) =

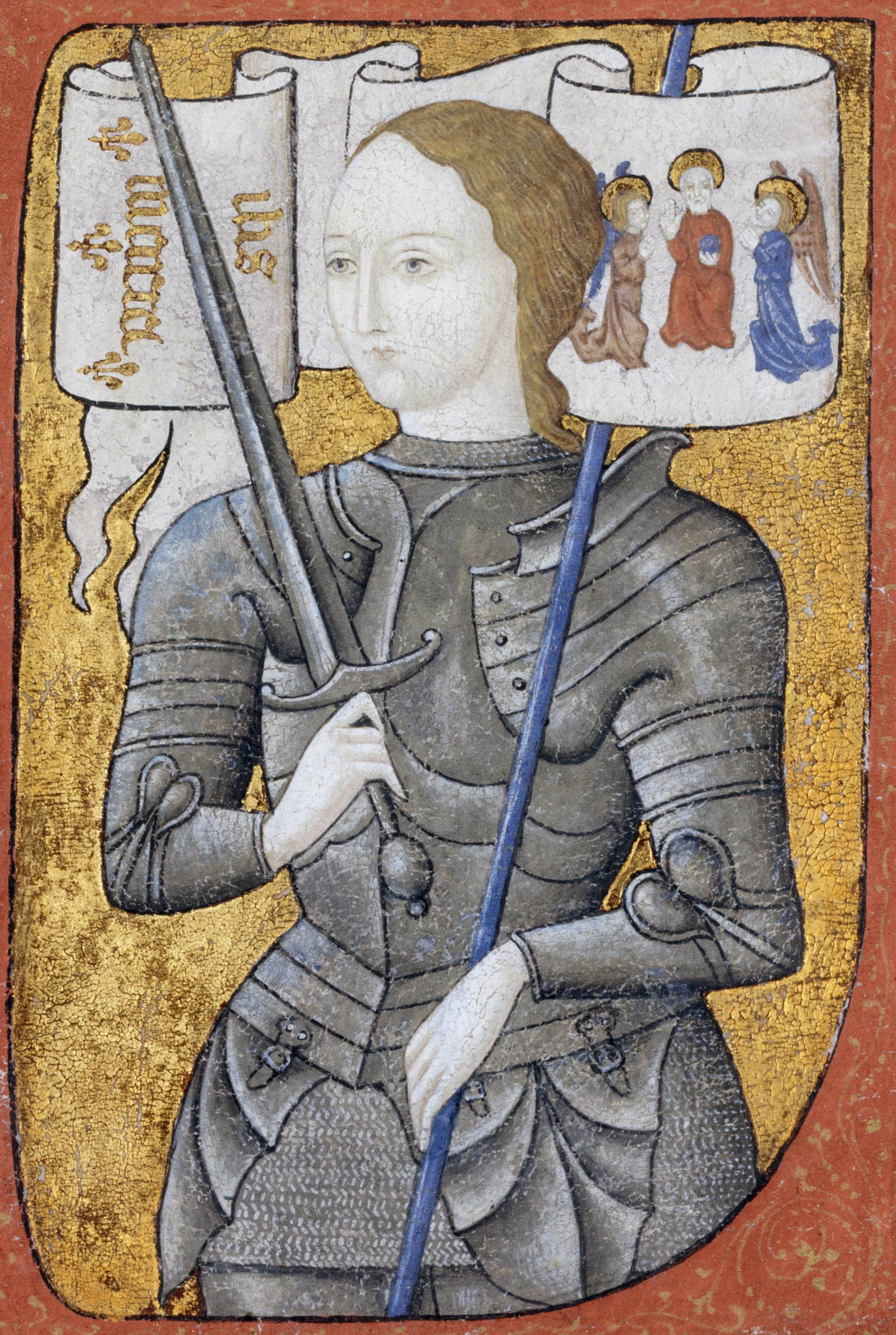
- Joan of Arc was largely responsible for the popularity of the name Joan for girls in the English-speaking world in recent years.
- Pronunciation: English: /dʒoʊn/; Catalan-Valencian, Occitan: [(d)ʒuˈan]
- Gender: Female (for Anglosphere name); Male (in Catalan-Valencian languages and Occitan language; the local form of John)

Origin
- Origin: Hebrew
- Meaning: The Lord is gracious

Other names
- Related names: Female: Jaana and Jana, Jane and Janet or "Jan", Jean, Jeanne, Johanna and Johanne, Joanne, Juana and Juanita, Joana, Ivana, Jovana and Jovanka, Ioana, Siân, Siobhán, Siwan; Male: Evan and Ivan, Ian and Iain, Ifan and Iefan, Ioan, Ion, Jaan, Jan, João, Johan, Jouan, Jovan, Shane, Siôn, Seán, Sean and Shaun, Yanne.

Joan (female English name: /dʒoʊn/; male Catalan name: [(d)ʒuˈan]) is both a feminine form of the personal name John given to girls in the Anglosphere as well as the native masculine form of John in the Catalan-Valencian and Occitan languages. In both cases, the name is derived from the Greek via the Latin Ioannes and Ioanna (or Johannes and Johanna), and is thus cognate with John and related to its many forms, including its derived feminine forms.

The name was disseminated widely into many languages and cultures from the Greek name Ἰωάννης (romanised, Iōannēs), along with its feminine form Koine Greek: Ἰωάννα, romanized: Iōanna (romanised, Iōanna). Its ultimate origin, as with John, is from the Hebrew Yohanan (יוֹחָנָן), (Note: Also, a related longer form, Yəhôḥānān (יהוחנן), meaning 'Yahweh has been gracious'.) "Graced by Yah", or Yehohanan (יְהוֹחָנָן), "Yahweh is Gracious".

== History ==
The Anglosphere female name Joan entered the English language through the Old French forms, Johanne and Jehanne, female variants of the male name Johannes.

In Catalan-Valencian and Occitan, Joan (pronounced [(d)ʒuˈan]) has been in continuous use as the native, masculine form of John since at least the Middle Ages. Its feminine counterpart in these languages is Joana. Historically, Joan and Joam were also the main forms of John in medieval Portuguese (or Galician-Portuguese). The Lusophone world later diverged in adopting João ([ʒuˈɐ̃w]) as its native form of the masculine John, while Joana, as in Catalan and Occitan, remains the female form for Portuguese speakers. (Note: Compare to the name's Spanish forms, Juan (pronounced [xwan]) and Juana (pronounced [ˈxwana]).)

== List of figures named Joan ==
Below are lists of people and fictional characters named or known as Joan. They are divided by gender and time period, and are presented alphabetically within each list, by surname or title. Where the same name or title applies to more than one person, each is listed in order of birth year.

=== Women ===
==== Medieval and early modern periods ====
The following is a list of women known as Joan who lived in the Middle Ages (from around the 5th to the late 15th centuries) or in the early modern (late 15th century – c. 1800) period:

- Joan of Arc (c. 1412 – 1431), patron saint of France, saint and martyr in Anglicanism and Catholicism
- Known as Joan I:
  - Joan I, Countess of Burgundy (1191–1205)
  - Joan I, Countess of Auvergne (1326–1360)
  - Joan I, Countess of Dreux (1345–1346)
- Joan II, Countess of Auvergne (1378 – c. 1424)
- Joan Beaufort, Countess of Westmorland (c. 1379 – 1440), daughter of John of Gaunt, 1st Duke of Lancaster, wife of Ralph de Neville, 1st Earl of Westmorland and Robert Ferrers, 5th Baron Boteler of Wem
- Joan Beaufort, Queen of Scots (c. 1404 – 1445)
- Joan, Countess of Blois (died 1292)
- Joan of Penthièvre (1319–1384)
- Women who were also called Joan of England:
  - Joan of England, Queen of Sicily (1165–1199)
  - Joan, Lady of Wales (1188–1237), wife of Llywelyn the Great, the Prince of Wales, and daughter of John, King of England
  - Joan of England, Queen of Scotland (1210–1238)
  - Joan of Acre, Countess of Gloucester (1272–1307) daughter of Edward I of England
  - Joan of the Tower (1321–1362), first Queen consort of David II of Scotland
  - Joan of Kent (1328–1385), Princess of Wales, "the fair maid of Kent", wife of Edward the Black Prince and mother of King Richard II of England
  - Joan of England (c. 1333 – 1348), daughter of Edward III; betrothed to Peter of Castile, but died aged 14 of the Black Death while en route to Castile for her marriage
- Joan, Countess of Flanders (c. 1199 – 1244), also called Joan or Joanna of Constantinople
- Joan of France, Duchess of Berry (Saint Joan of Valois; 1464–1505), nun, and briefly Queen of France
- Joan of France, Duchess of Brittany 1391–1433
- Women also known as Joan of Habsburg:
  - Joanna of Austria, Princess of Portugal (1535–1573)
  - Joanna of Austria, Grand Duchess of Tuscany (1547–1578)
- Joan the Lame of Burgundy (1293–1348), first Queen consort of Philip VI of France
- Joan of Lancaster (1310–1345)
- Joan of Lusignan (died 1322)
- Joan of Lestonnac (1556–1640), Saint Joanna of Toulouse
- Also called Joan of Naples:
  - Joanna I of Naples (1325–1382)
  - Joanna II of Naples (1373–1435)
  - Joanna of Aragon, Queen of Naples (1454–1517), wife of Ferdinand I of Naples
  - Joanna of Naples (1478–1518), Queen of Naples and queen consort of Ferdinand II of Naples
- Those known as Joan of Navarre:
  - Joan I of Navarre (1273–1305)
  - Joan II of Navarre (1312–1349), princess of France
  - Joan of Navarre (1326–1387), nun, daughter of Joan II of Navarre and Philip III of Navarre
  - Joan of Navarre, Queen of England (c. 1368 – 1437)
- Called Joan of Portugal:
  - Joan of Portugal, queen of Castile (1439–1475)
  - Joanna, Princess of Portugal (1452–1490) princess and Catholic saint
  - Joana, Princess of Beira (1635–1653), Portuguese infanta
- Joan of Scotland, Countess of Morton (c. 1428 – 1486)
- Joan Shakespeare (1569–1646), sister of William Shakespeare
- Joan of Spain (1535–1573), infanta of Spain
- Joan of Taranto (died 1323), Queen of Armenia
- Joan, Countess of Toulouse (1220–1271)
- Women called Joan of Valois:
  - Joan of Valois, Countess of Hainaut (1294–1352)
  - Joan of Valois, Countess of Beaumont (1304–1363)
  - Joan of Valois, Queen of Navarre (1343–1373)
  - Joan of Valois, Duchess of Alençon (1409–1432)
  - Joan of France, Duchess of Bourbon (1435–1482)

==== Modern era ====
- Joan Allen (born 1956), American film actress
- Joan Anim-Addo (fl. since 1990s), Grenadian-born academic, poet, playwright and publisher
- Joan Armatrading (born 1950), British singer
- Joan Marie Aylward, Canadian politician
- Joan Baez (born 1941), American singer-songwriter
- Joan Barclay (1914–2002), American actress
- Joan Barnett (1945–2020), American casting director and television executive producer
- Joan Baxter, Canadian writer and journalist
- Joan Bennett (1910–1990), American actress
- Joan Benoit (born 1957), American marathon runner
- Joan Bielski (1923–2012), Australian activist
- Joan Blackman (born 1938), American actress
- Joan Blondell (1906–1979), American actress
- Joan Bodger (1923–2002), American writer, storyteller and educator
- Joan Cather (1882–1967), British suffragette
- Joan Caulfield (1922–1991), American actress
- Joan Chambers (1930–2016), Australian politician
- Joan Chandler (1923–1979), American actress
- Joan Chen (born 1961), Chinese-American actress and director
- Joan Collins (born 1933), English actress and author
- Joan Ganz Cooney (born 1929), American television producer
- Joan Cooper (1914–1999), English civil servant and social worker
- Joan Crawford (1907–1977), American actress
- Joan Crossley-Holland (1912–2005), English gallery owner and potter
- Joan Cusack (born 1962), American actress
- Joan Davis (1907–1961), American actress and comedian
- Joan Davis (cricketer) (1911–2004), Welsh cricketer
- Joan Didion (1934–2021), American writer
- Joan Dowling (1928–1954), British actress
- Joan Eardley (1921–1963), British painter
- Joan Embery (born 1949), American zoologist and conservationist
- Joan Evans (disambiguation), multiple people
- Joan Feynman (1927–2020), American astrophysicist
- Joan Bamford Fletcher (1909–1979), Canadian member of the First Aid Nursing Yeomanry
- Joan Fontaine (1917−2013), British-American actress
- Joan Gilbert (1906−1991), English broadcaster
- Joan Gomberg (born 1957), American research geophysicist
- Joan Gould (1927–2022), American author and journalist
- Joan Greenwood (1921−1987), English actress
- Joan Grounds (1939–2010), American-born Australian artist
- Joan Haanappel (1940–2024), Dutch figure skater and sports presenter
- Joan Hackett (1934–1983), American actress
- Joan B. Hague (active 1971–1982), American politician
- Joan Hansen (born 1958), American long-distance runner
- Joan Harnett (born 1943), New Zealand netball player and real estate agent
- Joan Hickson (1906–1998), English actress
- Joan Higginbotham (born 1963), American astronaut
- Joan Hotchkis (1927–2022), American actress
- Joan Houchen (1930–2020), American politician
- Joan Humphreys, former Hong Kong international lawn bowler
- Joan Jameson (1892–1953), Irish painter
- Joan Jara (born 1927), British-Chilean dancer and widow of Víctor Jara
- Joan Jefferson Farjeon (1913–2006), English scenographer and scenic designer
- Joan Jett (born 1958), American musician
- Joan Jones (1939–2019), Canadian businesswoman and civil rights activist
- Joan O. Joshua (1912–1993), English veterinary surgeon, dog breeder and feminist
- Joan Kennedy (soldier) (1908–1956), Canadian soldier
- Joan Kennedy Taylor (1926–2005), American writer and political activist
- Joan Bennett Kennedy (born 1936), American socialite, and first wife of U.S. Senator Ted Kennedy
- Joan Kennedy (musician) (fl. 1983–c. 2000), Canadian country music singer
- Joan La Barbara (born 1947), American vocalist and composer
- Joan Marie Laurer ("Chyna"; 1969–2016), American pornographic actress, bodybuilder, model, and former professional wrestler
- Joan Lawson (1907–2002), English ballet dancer and writer
- Joan Leemhuis-Stout (born 1946), Dutch politician
- Joan Le Mesurier (1931–2021), English actress and author
- Joan Leslie (1925–2015), American actress
- Joan Lin (born 1953), Taiwanese actress
- Joan Lindsay (1896–1984), Australian author, best known for her novel Picnic at Hanging Rock
- Joan Littlewood (1914–2002), English theatre director
- Joan Lunden (born 1950), American journalist, author and television presenter
- Joan Mellen, American writer and professor of English and creative writing
- Joni Mitchell (born Roberta Joan Mitchell, 1943), Canadian-American artist
- Joan Morgan (entomologist), (1921–1998), British entomologist
- Joan Moriarty (1923–2020), British nursing administrator
- Joan Trumpauer Mulholland (born 1941), American civil rights activist
- Joan Murray (disambiguation), multiple people
- Joan O'Brien (1936–2025), American actress and singer
- Joan O'Malley (active 1964–1996), Canadian civil servant
- Joan Onyemaechi Mrakpor (born 1966), Nigerian politician
- Joan Orenstein (1923–2009), Canadian actress
- Joan Osborne (born 1962), American singer-songwriter
- Joan Plowright (1929–2025), English actress
- Joan Rayner (1900–1999), Australian theatre educator
- Joan Redwing (active from c. 1994), materials scientist and professor
- Joan Regan (1928–2013), English singer
- Joan Rice (1930–1997), English actress
- Joan Richmond (1905–1999), Australian racing driver
- Joan Rimmer (1918–2014), English musicologist
- Joan Riviere (1883–1962), English psychoanalyst
- Joan Rivers (1933–2014), American comedian, talk show host and businesswoman
- Joan R. Rosenblatt (1926–2018), American statistician
- Joni Robbins (born Joan Eva Rothman; died 2020), American voice actress
- Joan Robinson (1903–1983), British economist
- Joan Sanderson (1912–1992), English actress
- Joan Schulze (born 1936), American artist, lecturer, and poet
- Joan Semmel (born 1932), American feminist painter
- Joan Severance (born 1958), American model and actress
- Joan Silber (born 1945), American writer
- Joan Sims (1930–2001), English actress
- Joan Micklin Silver (1935–2020), American film director
- Joan Smalls (born 1988), Puerto Rican model and television personality
- Joan Smith (disambiguation), multiple people
- Joan Staniswalis (1957–2018), American statistician
- Joan Steinbrenner (1935–2018), American vice-chair of the New York Yankees baseball team
- Joan Sutherland (1926–2010), Australian opera singer
- Joan Sydney (1936–2022), English-Australian actress
- Joan Taylor (1929–2012), American actress
- Joan Tewkesbury (born 1936), American film and television director and screenwriter
- Joan Thiele (born 1991), Italian singer-songwriter
- Joan Tighe (1922–2014), Irish journalist and historian
- Joan Tower (born 1938), American composer
- Joan Tully (1907–1973), Australian agricultural scientist
- Joan Vass (1925–2011), American fashion designer.
- Joan Wall (1933–2023), English field hockey player and sports administrator
- Joan Walters (1924–2011), American professor
- Joan Wexler (born 1946), American Dean and President of Brooklyn Law School
- Joan S. Whitmore (1922–2002), South African hydrologist specialising in agriculture and water
- Joan Wulff (born 1926), American fly fisher
- Joan Wyndham (1921–2007), British writer and memoirist

=== Men ===
The following is a list of men known as Joan:

- John or Joan, a cneaz (local chieftain or ruler) in Wallachia around 1247
- Joan Adon (born 1998), MLB pitcher for Washington Nationals
- Joan Blaeu (1596–1673), Dutch cartographer
- Joan Boada, Cuban ballet dancer
- Joan Capdevila (born 1978), Catalan footballer
- Joan Comorera (1894–1958), Catalan communist politician
- Joan Cornellà (born 1981), Catalan cartoonist and illustrator
- Joan Milton Cwaik (born 1990), Argentinian technology communicator and entrepreneur
- Joan Daemen (born 1965), Belgian cryptographer and inventor of Rijndael
- Joan Gamper (1877–1930), Swiss-born Catalan footballer and businessman most famous as the founder of FC Barcelona
- Joan Gaspart (born 1944), Catalan businessman and president of FC Barcelona (2000–2003)
- Joan Ignasi Elena (born 1968), Catalan politician
- Joan Laporta (born 1962), Catalan lawyer and president of FC Barcelona (2003–2010)
- Joan Llaneras (born 1969), Catalan track cyclist
- Joan Majó (born 1938), Catalan politician
- Joan Manuel Serrat (born 1943), Catalan songwriter
- Joan Martorell (1833–1906), Catalan architect
- Joan Mir (born 1997), Catalan motorcycle racer
- Joan Miró (1893–1983), Catalan artist
- Joan Oumari (born 1988), Lebanese footballer
- Joan Ribó (born 1947), Catalan politician
- Joan Roca i Fontané (born 1964), Catalan chef
- Joan Salvador i Riera (1683–1726), Spanish naturalist, pharmacist, and botanist
- Joan Sansó Riera (born 2000), Catalan para-cyclist
- Joan Sebastian (1951–2015), Mexican vocalist
- Joan Verdú (born 1983), Catalan footballer
- Joan Villadelprat, Catalan Former Operations Director and Team Manager at Benetton Formula
- Joan Voûte (1879–1963), Dutch astronomer
- Joan van der Waals (1920–2022), Dutch physicist
- Naitō Joan (内藤 如安; died 1626), Japanese samurai and lord of Yagi Castle

=== Fictional characters ===
Legendary or fictional characters called Joan include:

- Pope Joan, 9th century legend
- Joan Clayton, a character from the TV series Girlfriends, played by Tracee Ellis Ross
- Joan Ferguson, a character from the TV series Wentworth
- Joan Holloway, character in the TV series Mad Men, played by Christina Hendricks
- Joan Watson, a character from the TV series Elementary, played by Lucy Liu

== See also ==
- All Wikipedia pages starting with "Joan"
- Saint Joan (disambiguation)
- Sant Joan (disambiguation)
- Darby and Joan, expression for a happily married couple who led a placid, uneventful life
- Joanie
