= Jane (given name) =

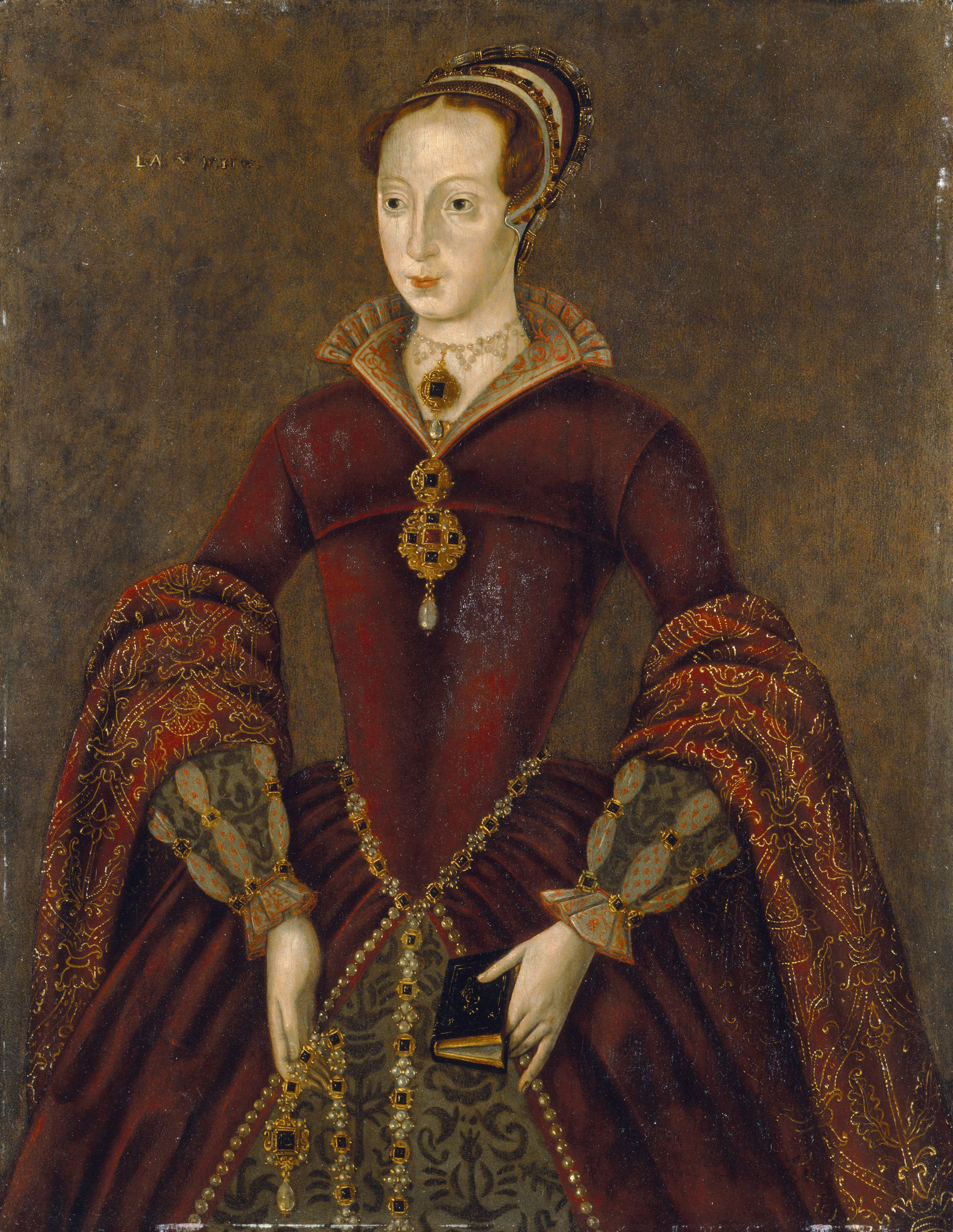
- Lady Jane Grey is a famous Jane.
- Gender: Feminine

Origin
- Language: Hebrew
- Meaning: "Yahweh is gracious/merciful"
- Region of origin: Worldwide

Other names
- Nicknames: Janie, Jenny
- Related names: John, Joanna, Joan
- Popularity: see popular names

Jane is a feminine given name. It is the English form of Jehanne, the Old French feminine form of Iohannes, a Latin form of the Greek name Ἰωάννης (Iōannēs), which is ultimately derived from the Hebrew name יוֹחָנָן (Yochanan), a short form of the name יְהוֹחָנָן (Yehochanan), meaning "Yahweh is merciful".

The name was first used in large numbers in the mid-16th century for the daughters of aristocrats as an alternative to the more commonplace Joan. The two names have alternated in popularity. In the early 19th century, Jane rose in popular use in association with its perceived glamour. Joan became more popular in the early to mid-20th century, when it was ranked in the top 500 most popular names given to girls in the United States, but it has again been displaced by Jane on the popularity charts in the 21st century.

== Name variants ==
Alternate forms include:

- Asia (Polish, Italian)
- Dyeinne (Portuguese)
- Gianna (Italian)
- Gianetta (Italian)
- Giannetta (Italian)
- Giannina (Italian)
- Giovanna (Italian)
- Hana (Czech)
- Johanna, Janka (Hungarian)
- Hanne (German)
- Hannele (Finnish)
- Hannie (Dutch)
- Hansine (German)
- Hansje, Hanna, Hannie (Dutch)
- Ioana (Romanian)
- Ioanna (Greek, Russian)
- Ionna (Greek)
- Ionela (Romanian)
- Iva (Slavic, Portuguese)
- Ivana (Czech, Croatian)
- Ivanna (Russian, Slavic)
- Ivanka (Czech, Slavic)
- Jaana (Finnish)
- Jaapje (Dutch)
- Jana (Czech, Latvian, Polish, Slovak, Albanian)
- Jane, Janet, Janisa, Jeanne, Jein, Jeiny, Jen, Jenny, Joan, Juanita, Yoanna, Yohana,(Indonesian)
- Janae (Modern American, English)
- Janeczka (Polish)
- Jane (Estonian)
- Jane (Circassian: Жьанэ and Джэнэ)
- Jane (Macedonian: Јане)
- Janelle (American English)
- Janes (Danish, Dutch, Finnish, Swedish)
- Janet (English, Scots)
- Janete (Portuguese)
- Janice (English, Portuguese)
- Janica (Czech)
- Janina (Polish, Lithuanian)
- Janine (French, English, Portuguese)
- Janka (Czech, Hungarian)
- Janna (Dutch, English, Swedish)
- Janne (Norwegian)
- Janneke (Dutch)
- Janneth (Scots)
- Jannetje (Dutch)
- Jannie (Dutch)
- Jannike (Scandinavian)
- Janotje (Dutch)
- Jans (Hebrew)
- Jansje (Dutch)
- Jante (Dutch)
- Jantina (Dutch)
- Jantine (Dutch)
- Jantje (Dutch)
- Januszy (Slavic)
- Jasia (Polish)
- Jayna (English)
- Jayne (English)
- Jean (English, Scots)
- Jeanette (French)
- Jeanna (English)
- Jeanne (French)
- Jeannie (English, Scots)
- Jehanne (French)
- Jenica (Romanian)
- Jenka (Czech)
- Jenne (Dutch)
- Jennet (Scots)
- Jenni (English)
- Jennie (English)
- Jenny (English)
- Jenjira (Thailand)
- Jensine (Danish, Norwegian)
- Jinn (Manx)
- Jinty (Scots)
- Joan (English, Manx)
- Joana (Basque, Catalan, Portuguese)
- Joanka (Polish)
- Joanna (English, Polish)
- Joanne (English)
- Joannia (Manx)
- Joasia (Polish)
- Johana (Dutch)
- Johanka (Czech)
- Johanna (Czech, Danish, Dutch, German, Norwegian, Swedish, Hungarian)
- Jóhanna (Icelandic)
- Johanne (Danish, Norwegian)
- Johanneke (Dutch)
- Johna (English)
- Johnet (Manx)
- Johnna (English)
- Johnnie (English)
- Joan (English)
- Joina (Danish)
- Jóna (Icelandic)
- Jone (Basque)
- Jonee (Manx)
- Joney (Manx)
- Jonie (English)
- Jovana (Serbian: Јована)
- Jovanka (Serbian: Јованка)
- Juana (Spanish)
- Juanita (Spanish)
- Jutta (German)
- Kini (Hawaiian)
- Nana (Greek: Νανα)
- Oana (Romanian)
- Ohanna (Armenian)
- Seanna (English)
- Seini (Tongan)
- Seona (Scots)
- Seonag (Scottish Gaelic)
- Seónaid (Scottish Gaelic)
- Shana (English)
- Shauna (English)
- Shavonne (English)
- Shawn (Irish)
- Shawna (English)
- Sheena (Scots)
- Shena (Irish)
- Shona (Scots)
- Siân (Welsh)
- Siâni (Welsh)
- Sian (Irish Language)
- Sina (Irish Gaelic)
- Sinéidin (Irish)
- Síne (Irish Gaelic)
- Sinéad (Irish Gaelic)
- Síneag (Scottish)
- Siobhán (Irish Gaelic)
- Sion (Welsh)
- Sioned (Welsh)
- Siubhan (Scottish Gaelic)
- Vanda (Portuguese)
- Vanja (Scandinavian, Slovenian)
- Vanna (Italian)
- Xana (Galician)
- Xoana (Galician)
- Yana (Bulgarian, Яна), (Russian), (Slavic)
- Yanick (Breton, French)
- Yanna (Greek)
- Yannic (Breton, French)
- Yannick (Breton, French)
- Yoana (Bulgarian, Йоана)
- Yochanna (Hebrew)
- Zaneta (Russian)
- Žaneta (Lithuanian)
- Žanna (Latvian)
- Zhanna (Russian)
- Zhannochka (Russian: Жанночка)
- Zsanett (Hungarian)

== People with this name ==
=== Arts ===
- Jhane Barnes (born 1954), fashion designer ("h" added as adult)
- Jane Burden (1839–1914), pre-Raphaelite model and muse
- Jane Antonia Cornish (born 1975), British Contemporary classical music composer
- Jane Petrie, Scottish costume designer
- Jane Dyer (born 1949), children's book illustrator
- Jane Frank (1918–1986), American artist
- Jane Gilmor (born 1947), American intermedia artist and educator
- Jane Grier (1856–1902), Irish-German textile artist
- Jane Kelly (born 1956), artist and journalist
- Jane Kent (born 1952), American artist and professor of printmaking
- Jane Sauer (born 1937), American fiber artist, sculptor
- Jane Tuckerman (born 1947), American photographer
- Jane Venis, New Zealand multimedia artist, musician and writer

=== Crime ===
- Jane Andrews (born 1967), murderer of Tom Cressman
- Jane Britton (1945–1969), female murder victim
- Jane Cakebread (1830–1898), infamous drunkard; the Inebriates Act 1898 was directly due to her case
- Jane Toppan (1854–1938), American serial killer, nicknamed "Jolly Jane"

=== Entertainment ===
- Jane Alexander (born 1939), American actress and author
- Jane Asher (born 1946), English actress and author
- Jane Avril (1868–1943), French dancer
- Jane Badler (born 1953), American–Australian actress and singer
- Jane Barbe (1928–2003), American voice artist and singer
- Jane Bathori (1877–1970), French opera singer
- Jane Baxter (1909–1996), German–born English actress
- Jane Birkin (1946–2023), English–French actress and singer
- Jane Bryan (1918–2009), American actress
- Jane Campion (born 1954), New Zealand filmmaker
- Jane Curtin (born 1947), American actress and comedian
- Jane Darwell (1879–1967), American actress
- Jane De Leon (born 1998), Filipina actress
- Jane de Wet (born 1996), South African actress
- Jane Espenson (born 1964), American producer and screenwriter
- Jane Fonda (born 1937), American actress and fitness instructor, daughter of Henry Fonda
- Jane Froman (1907–1980), American actress and singer
- Jane Goldman (born 1970), English author, producer, and screenwriter, wife of Jonathan Ross
- Jane Greer (1924–2001), American actress
- Jane Horrocks (born 1964), English actress
- Jane Huang (born 1983), Taiwanese singer
- Jane Kaczmarek (born 1955), American actress
- Jane Kean (1923–2013), American actress and singer
- Jane Krakowski (born 1968), American actress
- Jane Lapotaire (born 1944), English actress
- Jane Lawrence (1915–2005), American actress and opera singer
- Jane Leeves (born 1961), English actress
- Jane Levy (born 1989), American actress
- Jane Lowry (1937–2019), American actress
- Jane Lynch (born 1960), American actress, comedian, and singer
- Jane March (born 1973), English actress
- Jane McDonald (born 1963), English singer and television presenter
- Jane McGregor (born 1983), Canadian actress
- Jane Monheit (born 1977), American singer
- Jane Morgan (1924–2025), American actress and singer
- Jane Novak (1896–1990), American actress
- Jane Oineza (born 1996), Filipina actress, model and singer
- Jane Paknia (born 2000), American musician
- Jane Peyton (1870–1946), American actress
- Jane Pickens (1907–1992), American singer
- Jane Powell (1929–2021), American actress, dancer, and singer
- Jane Randolph (1914–2009), American actress
- Jane Remover (born 2003), American musician
- Jane Rosenthal (born 1956), American film producer
- Jane Russell (1921–2011), American actress
- Jane Seymour (born 1951), English actress
- Jane Sibbett (born 1962), American actress
- Jane Siberry (born 1955), Canadian singer and songwriter
- Jane Sourza (1902–1969), French actress
- Jane Tilden (1910–2002), Austrian actress
- Jane Turner (born 1960), Australian actress, comedian, and screenwriter
- Jane Wagner (born 1935), American director, producer, and writer
- Jane Weaver (born 1972), English musician, singer, and songwriter
- Jane Wiedlin (born 1958), American musician and singer, member of The Go-Go's
- Jane Winton (1905–1959), American actress, dancer, painter, writer, and operatic soprano
- Jane Withers (1926–2021), American actress and radio show host
- Jane Wolfe (1875–1958), American actress
- Jane Wyatt (1910–2006), American actress
- Jane Wyman (1917–2007), American actress, ex-wife of the 40th President of the United States Ronald Reagan
- Jane Zhang (born 1984), Chinese singer and songwriter

=== History ===
- Calamity Jane (1852–1903), U.S. frontierswoman
- Jane Addams (1860–1935), American Nobel Peace Prize-winning social worker and co-founder of Hull House
- Jane Kelley Adams (1852–1924), American educator
- Jane Grace Alexander (1848–1932), American banker
- Jane Digby (1807–1881), English adventurer
- Jane Franklin (née Griffin; 1791–1875), English explorer
- Jane Gemmill (1855-?), Scottish temperance activist
- Jane Louisa Hardy (1828–1915), American temperance activist and philanthropist
- Jane Horney (1918–1945), Swedish spy during WWII
- Jane Roe, alias of Norma McCorvey (1947–2017), plaintiff in the landmark 1973 Roe v. Wade Supreme Court case that legalized abortion in the United States
- Jane Johnston Schoolcraft (1800–1842), early Native American writer

=== Literature ===
- Jane Austen (1775–1817), British novelist, known for Emma and Pride and Prejudice
- Jane Baird (1875 –1960), Scottish educator and Esperantist
- Jane Bowles (1917–1973), American writer and playwright
- Jane T. H. Cross (1817–1870), American author
- Jane Louise Curry (born 1932), American writer
- Jane Gardam (1928–2025), English writer
- Jane Lewers Gray (1796–1871), Northern Ireland-born American poet and hymnwriter
- Jane Eaton Hamilton (born 1954), Canadian author
- Jane Hamilton (born 1957), American author
- Jane Hampton Cook, American author and historian
- Jane Harvey (writer) (1771–1848) British poet and novelist
- Jane Jacobs (1916–2006), American-Canadian journalist, author, and urban theorist
- Jane Lindskold (born 1962), American author
- Jane Roberts (1929–1984), American author, poet, psychic, and spirit medium
- Jane Rose (1880–1927), Yiddish dramatist and theater activist
- Jane Smiley (born 1949), American novelist
- Jane Agnes Stewart (1860–1944), American author, editor, and contributor to periodicals
- Jane Suiter, Irish journalist and academic
- Jane Taylor (1783–1824), English poet and novelist
- Jane Urquhart (born 1949), Canadian novelist and poet
- Jane Wilde (1821–1896), Irish poet under the pen name Speranza
- Jane Wilde Hawking (born 1944), ex-wife of Stephen Hawking
- Jane T. Worthington (1821–1847), American essayist, poet
- Jane Yolen (1939–2026), American author

=== News media ===
- Jane Elliott (born 1933), American civil rights activist, known for "Blue eyes–Brown eyes" exercise.
- Jane Grant (1892–1972) American journalist
- Jane Hill (born 1969), British newsreader
- Jane Kramer (born 1938), American journalist
- Jane Pauley (born 1950), American television journalist
- Jane Pratt (born 1962), American magazine editor and publisher

=== Politics ===
- Jane Ellison, British politician
- Jane Harman (born 1945), member of the United States House of Representatives, representing California's 36th congressional district
- Jane Irwin Harrison (1804–1845), first lady of the United States
- Jane Hill (1936–2015), Australian politician
- Jane Hunt (American politician)
- Jane Hunt (British politician)
- Jane Kagiri, Kenyan politician
- Jenny (Jane) Kenney (1884–1961) also known as Jennie, British suffragette and Montessori teacher
- Jane Njoki Mugambi (born 1967) in Gituamba Village, Central Province, Kenya
- Jane Muskie (1927–2004), First Lady of Maine
- Jane Perceval (1769–1844), spouse of the Prime minister of the United Kingdom from 1808 to 1812
- Jane Pierce (1806–1863), first lady of the United States from 1853 to 1857
- Jane Pringle, American politician
- Florence Jane Short (aka Rachel Peace) (1881 – died after 1932), British feminist and suffragette
- Jane Swift (born 1965), American politician, acting governor of Massachusetts from 2001 to 2003
- Jane Lomax-Smith (born 1950), Australian politician
- Jane Tedesco (1906–1997), American politician
- Jane Valbot (1884–1961), French pacifist and suffragist
- Jane Wisialowski, American politician

=== Religion ===
- Jane Elizabeth Faulding (1843–1904), British Protestant Christian missionary
- Jane Frances de Chantal (1572–1641), French saint

=== Royalty and nobility ===
- Jane Boleyn, Viscountess Rochford (1505–1542)
- Lady Jane Fellowes (born 1957)
- Lady Jane Grey (1537–1554), Queen of England, also known as "Jane of England"
- Jane Ingleby (died 1651), English aristocrat, recusant, and female soldier
- Jane Lane, Lady Fisher (1626–1689), played a heroic role in the escape of Charles II in 1651
- Jane Loeau (1828–1873), Hawaiian noble lady
- Jane Seymour (1508–1537), Queen and wife of King Henry VIII of England
- Jane Spencer, Baroness Churchill (1826–1900)
- Baroness Jane von Westenholz (born 1954), Queen's Companion to Queen Camilla
- Jane Wharton, 7th Baroness Wharton (1706–1761)

=== Science ===
- Jane Ammons (born 1953), American industrial engineer
- Jane Colden (1724–1766), American botanist
- Jane Frankland (born 1968), English cybersecurity expert
- Jane Forer Gentleman (1940–2023), American and Canadian statistician
- Jane Goodall (1934–2025), English primatologist, known for studying chimpanzees and founder of the Jane Goodall Institute
- Jane Lord Hersom (1840–1928), American physician, suffragist
- Jane Hutton, British statistician
- Jane Loevinger (1918–2008), American developmental psychologist
- Jane Luu (born 1963), Vietnamese-American astronomer and defense systems engineer
- Jane Madders (c. 1909–1990), British physiotherapist, educator and author
- Jane McGrath (1966–2008), co-founder of the McGrath Foundation
- Jane Mogina, Papua New Guinea biodiversity specialist
- Jane H. Rider (1889–1981), American engineer and bacteriologist
- Jane M. Simoni, American clinical psychologist

=== Sport ===
- Jane Albright (born 1955), American basketball player and coach
- Jane Barkman (born 1951), American swimmer
- Jane Bartkowicz (born 1949), American tennis player
- Jane Burley (born 1971), Scottish field hockey midfielder
- Jane Cederqvist (1945–2023), Swedish swimmer
- Jane Daley (ice hockey) (born 2009), American ice hockey player
- Jane Frederick (born 1952), American heptathlete
- Jane Karla Gögel (born 1975), Brazilian para archer and para table tennis player
- Jane Haist (1949–2022), Canadian discus thrower and shot putter
- Jane Joseph, Trinidadian cricketer
- Jane Katz (born 1943), American swimmer
- Jane Kuehl (born 2003), American ice hockey player
- Jane Patterson, Canadian judoka
- Jane Salumäe (born 1968), Estonian long-distance runner
- Jayne Torvill (born 1957), British ice-dancer and 1984 Olympic gold medalist with partner Christopher Dean
- Jane Weiller (1912–1989), American golfer

=== Other ===
- Jane M. Bowers (1936–2022), American flautist, musicologist and feminist
- Jane Bruce, Canadian teacher and principal
- Jane Norton Grew, American socialite
- Jane Sinclair Reid (1883–1968), Australian educator of blind students
- Jane Rooney, New Zealand architect
- Jane Farwell Smith (1906–1997), American clubwoman

=== Fictional characters ===
==== In law ====
Jane Doe or Jane Roe is used in American law as a placeholder name for anonymous or unknown female participants in legal proceedings

Jane Doe is used in United States police investigations when the identity of a female victim is unknown or incorrect, and by hospitals to refer to a female corpse or patient whose identity is unknown.

==== Comic book characters ====
- Jane Foster, a Marvel Comics character
- Painkiller Jane, a comic book character that spawned a made-for-TV movie and a TV series

==== Characters in literature ====
- Jane, an AI character first introduced in Orson Scott Card's Speaker for the Dead
- Dick and Jane, characters by Zerna Sharp
- Jane, an entity resembling modern conceptions of AI, from the Ender's Game series
- Jane Eyre, the titular character of a famous novel by Charlotte Brontë and several film adaptations
- Baby Jane Hudson, the titular character in the novel and film What Ever Happened to Baby Jane?
- Miss Marple (first name Jane), an amateur detective created by Agatha Christie
- Jane Porter, the sweetheart of Tarzan
- Jayne Deverill, a Yorkshire witch in the Power of Five series by Anthony Horowitz
- Jane Studdock, protagonist in That Hideous Strength by C.S. Lewis

==== Characters in TV, film, and theater ====
- Jane, on 7th Heaven
- Jane Beale (previously Collins), from the BBC soap opera EastEnders
- Jayne Cobb, a male character on the sci-fi series Firefly
- G.I. Jane, a 1997 war movie, with Demi Moore in the leading role
- Jane Hopper, also known as Eleven, a main character in the Netflix series Stranger Things
- Jane Lane, on the television show Daria
- Jane Mancini, on Melrose Place and the 2009 remake
- Jane Read, character in the Arthur book and television series
- Jane Vaughn, in Degrassi: The Next Generation
- Jane Gloriana Villanueva, main character of television series Jane the Virgin

== See also ==
- Jane (disambiguation)
- Janes, the surname
- Janie
- Jayne
- Jayna
- Plain Jane (disambiguation)
- Jaine
