= Juana =

Female given name

- Gender: Female

Other gender
- Masculine: Juan (Spanish)

Origin
- Origin: Spanish derivation of Jane or Manx derivation of Jane
- Meaning: "Yahweh has been Gracious", "Graced by Yahweh" (Johanan)
- Region of origin: Spain/Philippines/Latin America

Other names
- Pet name: Juanita (Spanish)
- Related names: Jane, Jean, Joan, Joanna, Juan, John

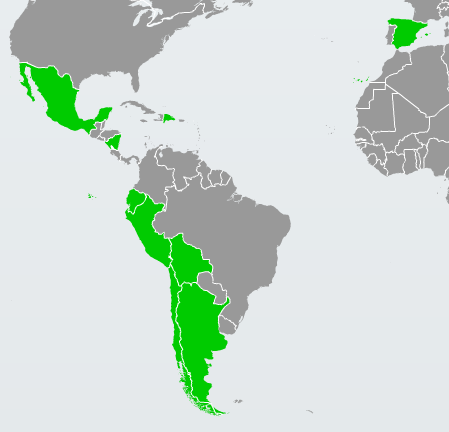
Areas where Juana is common

Juana is a Spanish female name. It is the feminine form of Juan (English John), and thus corresponds to the English names Jane, Jean, Joan, and Joanna. The feminine diminutive form (male equivalent to Johnny) is Juanita (equivalent to Janet, Janey, Joanie, etc). It is very common in Spain, the other Spanish-speaking countries around the world, and in the Philippines. The name Juana may refer to:

== People ==
- Juana I (1479–1555), Queen of Castile and Aragon
- Juana Rosa Aguirre (1877–1963), Chilean first lady
- Juana Azurduy de Padilla (1780–1862), South American military leader
- Juana Barraza (born 1957), Mexican serial killer
- Juana Belén Gutiérrez de Mendoza (1875–1942), Mexican writer
- Juana Bormann (1893–1945), German war criminal
- Juana Briones de Miranda (1802–1889), American landowner
- Juana Castro (born 1933), Cuban exile
- Juana Cruz (1917–1981), Spanish bullfighter
- Juana Dib (1924-2015), Argentine poet, journalist, and teacher
- Juana de Ibarbourou (1892–1979), Uruguayan poet
- Juana Enríquez (1425–1468), Queen of Aragon
- Juana Inés de la Cruz (1651–1695), Mexican scholar
- Juana Larando (fl. 1630), Basque female privateer
- Juana Lecaros (1920–1993), Chilean visual artist and poet
- Juana Teresa Juega López (1885-1979), Galician-language Spanish poet
- Juana Lumerman (1905–1982), Argentine artist
- Juana Manuel (1339–1381), Queen of Castile
- Juana Manuela Gorriti (1818–1892), Argentine writer
- Juana María de los Dolores de León Smith (1798–1872), Spanish noblewoman
- Juana Maria (1811–1853), Native American castaway
- Juana Molina (born 1961), Argentine singer-songwriter
- Juana Romani (1869–1924), Italian painter
- Juana Ross Edwards (1830-1913), Chilean philanthropist
- Juana de J. Sarmiento (1899-1979), Colombian politician, activist
- Juana Saviñón (born 1980), Dominican volleyball player

== See also ==
- Juanita (disambiguation)
