= Juanita =

Juanita may refer to:

== Film and television ==
- Juanita (1935 film), film directed by Pierre Caron
- Juanita (2019 film), film starring Alfre Woodard

== Music ==
- "Juanita" (Caroline Norton song), also known as "Nita Juanita"
- "Juanita" (Underworld song), a 1996 song by Underworld
- "Wanita" or "Juanita", a 1923 Al Jolson hit song
- "Juanita", a 1956 hit song by Chuck Willis
- "Juanita", a track from The Gilded Palace of Sin by the Flying Burrito Brothers
- "Juanita", a song by Björn Afzelius on the Hoola Bandoola Band album Fri Information
- "Juanita", a song by Eddie Meduza on the album Gasen i botten
- "Juanita", a song by Shania Twain on the album Up!

== Places ==
- Juanita, Kirkland, Washington, a neighborhood of the city of Kirkland
- Juanita High School, in King County, Washington, USA
- Juanita's, a music venue in Little Rock, Arkansas, USA
- Hacienda Juanita, a hotel in Puerto Rico
- Juanita, an earlier spelling of Waneta in British Columbia, Canada

== Other ==
- Juanita (children's book), a 1947 book by Leo Politi
- Juanita (given name), a diminutive of Juana, a female given name in Spanish
- Mummy Juanita, or "The Ice Maiden", a 15th-century Inca mummy discovered in 1995

== See also ==
- Janey
- Joanie
