= Marie Weir =

Scottish hockey player and coach (1926–2022)

Dr Marie Weir
Personal information
- Born: Jaffrey Smith; 3 June 1926 Findo Gask, Perthshire, Scotland
- Died: 27 February 2022 (aged 95) Kinross, Scotland

Sport
- Sport: Field hockey

Marie Weir (3 June 1926 – 27 February 2022; known as Jaffrey Smith) was a Scottish International hockey player, Scottish International hockey coach and author.

== Hockey ==
Weir played for Scotland in the 1940s and 1950s.

Weir turned to coaching in the 1970s after amassing more than 20 caps.

Weir is synonymous with changing the way women's hockey was coached, selected teams and the tactics used, changing to a sweeper system, from a 5–3–3.

The Scottish Women's team beat England at the IFWHA World Tournament whilst Weir was coaching the team, known as the "Dream Team".

== Author ==
- Hockey coaching: a psychological approach to the women's game, 1977
- Women's hockey for the seventies, 1974
- The times of my life, autobiography

== See also ==
- Jonathan Livingston Seagull Weir's inspiration
- Women's IFWHA World Conference
