= Joan Wall =

Joan Wall may refer to:

- Joan Wall (mezzo-soprano)
- Joan Wall (field hockey)
