= Gumberg =

Gumberg is a surname. Notable people with the surname include:

- Alexander Gumberg (1887–1939), Ukrainian immigrant to the US
- Jordan Gumberg (born 1995), American golfer
- Stanley Gumberg (1927–2009), American businessman, investor, philanthropist, and sailor

== See also ==
- Gumberg Library
- Gomberg, another surname
