= Siwan =

Siwan may refer to

- Sivan, a month of the Hebrew calendar
- Siwan (Mandaean month), a month of the Mandaean calendar
- The Welsh form of Joan (first name)
  - Siwan or Joan, Lady of Wales, the wife and consort of Llywelyn the Great, Prince of Wales
- Siwan (play), by Saunders Lewis
- Sewant, beads used as a currency by Native Americans
- Siwan (album), a musical orchestra project by Jon Balke, and featuring Amina Alaoui
- Siwan, Henan, a town in Xichuan County, Henan, China

== India ==
- Siwan district, in the state of Bihar
- Siwan, Bihar, the headquarters of the Siwan district
- Siwan subdivision, of Siwan district
- Siwan (community development block), in Siwan district
- Siwan Lok Sabha constituency, a parliamentary constituency in Bihar
- Siwan Assembly constituency, a constituency of the Bihar Legislative Assembly
- Siwan Junction railway station, a railway junction station in the state of Bihar
- Siwan, Raebareli, a village in Uttar Pradesh

== People ==
- Siwan (Korean singer), member of boy group ZE:A
- Siwan Morris, Welsh actress
- Siwan Lillicrap, Welsh rugby union player
