= Juanita (given name) =

Female given name

Juanita is a feminine given name. Juanita is the Spanish diminutive for the name Juana, but it is sometimes given as a name in its own right, across linguistic contexts. Notable holders of the name include:

- Juanita Abernathy (1931–2019), American civil rights activist
- Juanita Bartlett (1927–2014), American screenwriter
- Juanita Broaddrick (born 1942), American nursing home administrator
- Juanita Brooks (1898–1989), American historian
- Juanita Bynum (born 1959), American gospel singer
- Juanita Casey (1925–2012), British writer and animal trainer
- Juanita Castro (1933–2023), Cuban dissident, sister of Fidel Castro
- Juanita Coco (1975–1993), Australian singer
- Juanita Craft (1902–1985), American civil rights activist
- Juanita du Plessis (born 1972), Namibian-Afrikaans singer
- Juanita Frances (1901–1992), Australian-born British feminist
- Juanita García (1943–2014), American singer
- Juanita García Peraza (1897–1970), Puerto Rican religious leader
- Juanita Hall (1901–1968), American actress
- Juanita Hansen (1895–1961), American actress
- Juanita Helms (1941–2009), American politician
- Juanita Helphrey (1941–2018), Native American community leader, church worker
- Juanita Jennings (born 1952), American actress
- Juanita M. Kreps (1921–2010), American economist
- Juanita Melson (1940s–2017), Singaporean radio personality
- Juanita Moore (1914–2014), American actress
- Juanita Nathan, Canadian politician
- Juanita Nielsen (born 1937), Australian journalist, missing since 1975
- Juanita Parra (born 1970), Chilean drummer
- Juanita Quigley (1931–2017), American child actress
- Juanita Sánchez (died 1992), American social worker
- Juanita Slusher, more commonly known as Candy Barr
- Juanita Spinelli (1889–1941), American criminal
- Juanita Tate (1938–2004), American community organizer
- Juanita Ollie Diffay Tate (1904–1988), American economics professor
- Juanita Terry Williams (1925–2000), American politician
- Juanita Urrea (born 2000), Colombian beauty queen and engineer
- Waneta Storms, Canadian actress
- Wanita Dokish (1936–2016), American baseball player
- Wanita Lynch (born 1958), Australian gymnast
- Wanita May (born 1975), Canadian high jumper

== See also ==
- Juana
- Janie (given name)
