= Joan Evans =

Joan Evans may refer to:

- Joan Evans (art historian) (1893–1977), British art historian
- Joan Evans (actress) (1934–2023), American film actress
- Joan Evans (charity worker), Australian religious sister and charity activist

== See also ==
- Joanne Evans, New Zealand footballer
