= Gomberg =

Gomberg is a surname. It may refer to:

- David Gomberg (born 1953), American small business owner, kite flier and politician
- Guy Gomberg (born 1990), Israeli footballer
- Harold Gomberg (1916–1985), American oboist (brother of Ralph)
- Joan Gomberg (born 1957), American research geophysicist
- Moses Gomberg (1866–1947), American chemist
- Ralph Gomberg (1921–2006), American oboist (brother of Harold)
- Sheldon Gomberg, music producer and engineer and bassist
- Sy Gomberg (1918–2001), American film screenwriter, producer and activist
- Tooker Gomberg (1955–2004), Canadian politician and environmental activist
