= Joan Murray (disambiguation) =

Joan Murray is an American poet.

Joan Murray may also refer to:

- Joan Vincent Murray, Canadian-American poet
- Joan Murray (art historian), Canadian art historian
- Joan Murray (journalist), American journalist
- Joan Clarke, English cryptanalyst and numismatist; known as Joan Murray after marriage.
