= Jane Rose (dramatist) =

- Born: c. 1880; Minsk, Russian Empire
- Died: 14 July 1927; Cleveland
- Occupation: dramatist
- Spouse: Abel Rose
- Writing career
- Genre: one-act play

Jane Rose (Yiddish: דזשעין ראוז; née Tsukerman) (c. 1880–July 14, 1927) was a Yiddish dramatist and theater activist.

She was born to a well-off family. At the age of 16, she emigrated to the United States, where she found work in a shop in New York and quickly learned the English language. Thanks to her brother, a dentist and activist in Jewish socialist and anarchist circles, she became a passionate socialist. She gained familiarity with Yiddish literature. She married her compatriot, Abel Rose, who was a member of the most important Yiddish drama circles.

She became active in the Progresiv dramatik klub (Progressive Drama Club). Around 1910, she began to write in Yiddish and English, mostly in dramatic form. She published her English one-act plays in the Sunday editions of the socialist newspaper The Call. Her Yiddish one-acters were published in the anarchist newspaper Fraye Arbeter Shtime.

From 1912 on, she lived in Cleveland. There, she turned her house into a center for Yiddish literature and drama. She also helped to found a Yiddish drama society, in which she directed and also acted. In 1919, she became seriously ill and was paralyzed and bed-ridden until she died on July 14, 1927.

In 1918, Rose's seven one-act plays were published in a collected volume, with a foreword by Joel Entin (1875–1959).
