= Joanne Evans =

New Zealand footballer

Personal information
- Full name: Joanne Evans
- Place of birth: New Zealand

International career
Years	Team	Apps	(Gls)
1998	New Zealand	3	(0)

Joanne Evans is a former association football player who represented New Zealand at international level.

Evans made her Football Ferns début as a substitute in a record 21–0 win over Samoa in a Women's World Cup qualifier on 9 October 1998, and finished her international career with three caps to her credit.
