= Juana Larando =

Basque privateer

Juana Larando (fl. 1630) was a Spanish privateer from the Basque city of Donostia. She was a widow who had an inn as well as part ownership of a sailing/rowing ship called a pataché with which her crew captured and plundered enemy ships off the coast of France and England. Although she never sailed personally, she had financial agreements with her privateers giving her a share of their spoils from captured loot.

== Biography ==
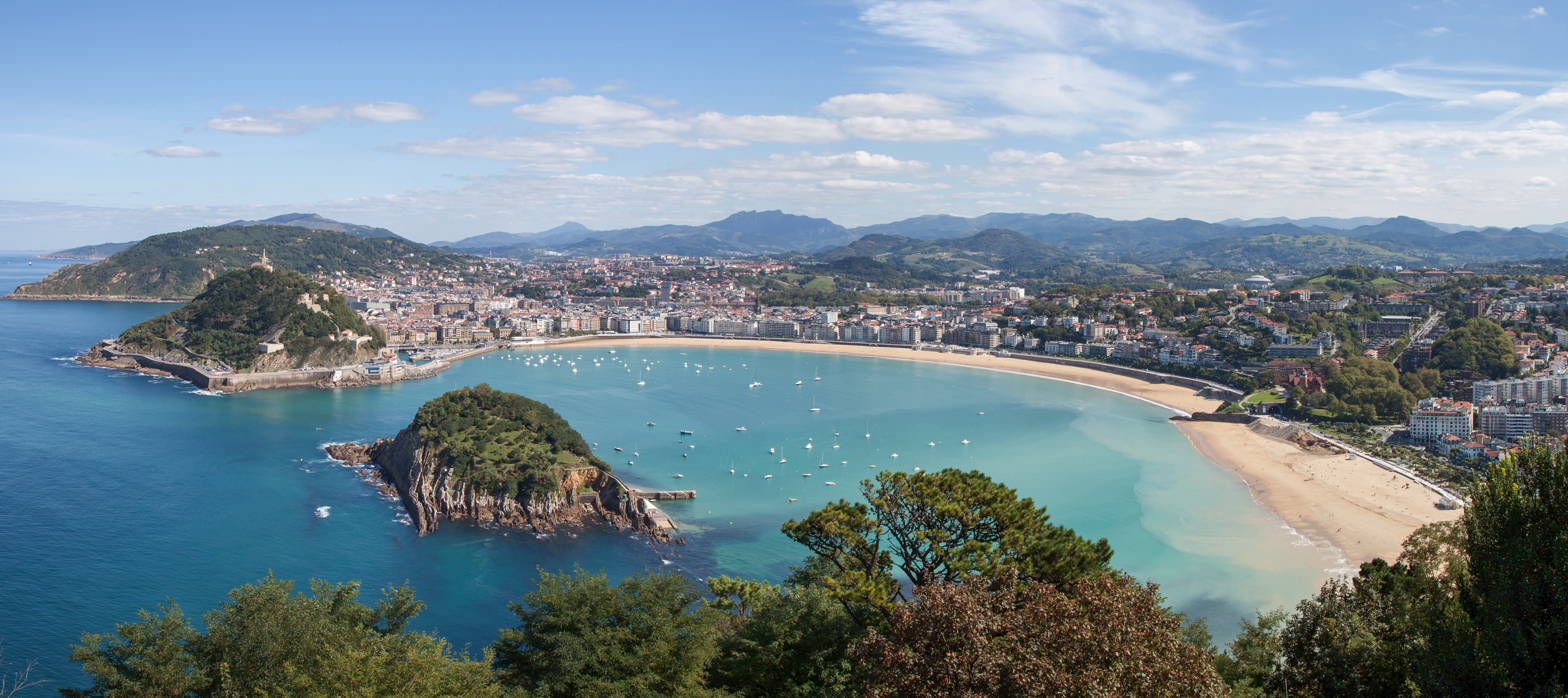
Photo of the port city officially known by the bilingual name Donostia / San Sebastián.

Juana Larando was a widow who owned an inn in Donostia (officially known by the bilingual name Donostia / San Sebastián in northern Spain) and housed privateers in her rooms. (Privateering is the practice of authorized sea-raiding and is not the same as Piracy, which is unauthorized.) The Basque port had a reputation that attracted local and foreign privateers and shipowners from all over the country as well as other regions of the north. These people lived in local inns between expeditions.

=== San Juan ship ===
In 1630, Juana Larando's lodge housed 18 adventurers. She did not charge the men anything to stay there until they earned money from looting, as mentioned in the Record of the Regiment of Toulouse. She used the profit from her share of her lodgers' booty to buy, with two other partners, a pataché, a small vessel called the San Juan. The ship was captained by Juan de Echániz.

On one of the San Juan's outings, the pirates captured 12,000 ducats, but on the way back to Donostia there was a mutiny on board. The San Juan became disabled and had to be abandoned forcing the privateers to capture a better ship, called the San Pedro from The Netherlands. The privateers then sailed to Zumaia in Basque Country where they sold the ship and loot for the significant sum of 11,155 reals.

The distribution of these reals caused a great uproar and became the subject of a trial because the percentages were considered poor despite the total being so large. The parish priest of Orio received a share because he was asked to give the Mass for the victory of the San Juan. The interpreter of the trial got a share. In addition, food given to the captured Flanders had to be paid. The total result of the distribution was as follows: 3,609 reals were given to Juana Larando; 677 reals went to Captain Echániz; 100 reals to the interpreter; and 86 reals to each privateer sailor.

=== Replica ===
In 2013, shipbuilders in Basque Country began creating a full size replica of the San Juan based on undersea research conducted by the Canadian government. The finished craft was launched in 2021 and called the Juanita Larando. The shallow-draft vessel is 15 metres (49 ft) long and 3.5 metres (11 ft) wide, has two large sails and holds a crew of 18 rowers/sailors. It was built by teachers and apprentices of the Ribera carpentry school of Pasaia, in Basque Country, Spain.
