= Plain Jane =

Plain Jane may refer to:

- Plain Jane, a 1922 play by McElbert Moore
- Plain Jane (Wednesday Theatre), an Australian TV movie
- Plain Jane (TV series), an American TV series airing on the CW
- Plain Jane (band), an American band from the late 1980s
- Plain Jane (album), a 2009 album by Chantal Kreviazuk
- "Plain Jane" (song), a 2017 song by rapper ASAP Ferg
- "Plain Jane", a 1959 song by Bobby Darin
- "Plain Jane", a 1979 song by Sammy Hagar on Street Machine
- "Plain Jane", a 2015 song by Jewel on Picking Up the Pieces
- "Plain Jane", a 2020 song by D-Block Europe

== See also ==
- Plain Jane Automobile, an American indie rock band
- The P.L.A.I.N. Janes, a comic book series
