= Jane M. Simoni =

American clinical psychologist

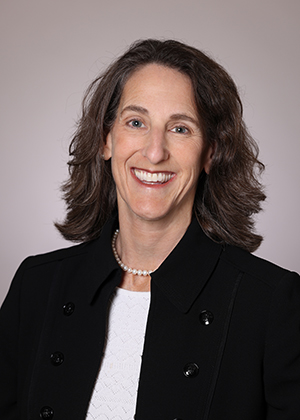
- Simoni in 2024
- Education: Princeton University; University of California, Los Angeles
- Scientific career
- Fields: Clinical psychology
- Workplaces: University of Washington; National Institutes of Health

Jane M. Simoni is an American clinical psychologist serving as the National Institutes of Health (NIH) associate director for behavioral and social sciences research and director of the Office of Behavioral and Social Sciences Research (OBSSR) since July 2023. She was previously a professor at the University of Washington from 2001 to 2023.

== Life ==
Simoni earned her B.A. at Princeton University and her Ph.D. at the University of California, Los Angeles. She completed postdoctoral fellowships at the University of Southern California and Columbia University.

A clinical psychologist, Simoni joined the faculty of the University of Washington (UW) in 2001, where she is a professor and director of clinical training in the department of psychology. She is the founding director of UW's Behavioral Research Center for HIV. She also co-directed the UW/Fred Hutch Center for AIDS Research.

Her research focused on health disparities and resilience among populations that have been socially marginalized, including persons with HIV and other chronic illnesses, Latinx, LGBT, and Indigenous peoples. Her intervention research has examined behavioral aspects of chronic illness, using mixed methods and clinical trials to evaluate strategies such as peer support, medical record alerts, provider training and counseling and mHealth to promote treatment engagement and health outcomes. Simoni has led more than two dozen research projects, including National Institutes of Health (NIH)-funded studies in New York City, Seattle, the Mexico–United States border, Beijing, Shanghai, Haiti and Kenya.

On July 30, 2023, Simoni became the NIH associate director for behavioral and social sciences research and director of the Office of Behavioral and Social Sciences Research (OBSSR).
