= Jane Kent =

American artist

Jane Kent (born 1952) is an American artist and professor of printmaking at the University of Vermont. Her work is included in the collections of the Whitney Museum of American Art, the RISD Museum and the Smithsonian American Art Museum.

== Early life and career ==
Kent graduated from the University of the Arts in Philadelphia, Pennsylvania. She received a MacDowell Fellowship in 2012, and her works from the fellowship were displayed at Print Center New York.
