= Joan Murray (journalist) =

American journalist (1937–2021)

Joan Murray (November 6, 1937 – December 18, 2021) was the first African-American woman to report the news on a major network show. She was employed by CBS in 1965 after writing a letter to CBS-TV requesting they hire her as a news broadcaster.

== Early life and career ==
Murray was born on November 6, 1937, in Ithaca, New York. She began her professional life as a court reporter, later becoming a secretary in the Press Department of CBS-TV in New York City, and then a secretary to Allen Funt of Candid Camera. She also worked as a writer for Women on the Move, an NBC daytime program hosted by television personality Kitty Carlisle. Joan and her twin sister appeared in both print and television commercials targeting the African-American consumer.

Murray's impact as a professional African-American woman was significant. In April 1965, she became the first African-American newswoman employed by a major television station, WCBS (Channel 2, New York City) and the only African-American woman ever to sit on the panel of the CBS game show What's My Line?. An accomplished aviator, she was the first African-American woman pilot to participate in the famed All Woman Transcontinental Air Race, or Powder Puff Derby, which each year flew a different route across the country. She also won many awards throughout her professional life, including the Mademoiselle Award for Outstanding Achievement, the Urban League's Certificate of Merit, and the Mary McLeod Bethune Achievement Award from the National Council of Negro Women.

In 1969, Murray left WCBS to co-found one of the first African-American advertising agencies, the Zebra Agency, which had numerous national advertisers. In 1967, Pepsi, determined to open a market that had been largely overlooked by rival Coca-Cola, sponsored The Joan Murray Show on radio, which was produced and nationally syndicated in the U.S. by Hartwest Productions, Inc.

== Ebony magazine ==
Murray was mentioned in Ebony several times. She was featured in a 1966 article called "TV News Hens" about black women who were breaking into television reporting. The other two women profiled were Trudy Haynes of KYW-TV and Edith Huggins of WCAU-TV.

== Retirement and death ==
In her retirement, Murray lived in upstate New York. She donated her archival materials to the Schomburg Center for Research in Black Culture, in Harlem, New York City. She died on December 18, 2021, at the age of 84.
