= Joan Walters =

American economist

Joan Marie Gilbert Walters
- Born: Providence, RI
- Died: Prescott, AZ
- Education: Harvard University
- Scientific career
- Fields: Economics
- Workplaces: Citibank; Fairfield University

Joan G. Walters (August 5, 1924 – July 31, 2011) was an American professor and pioneer in the field of economics. Walters received her master's degree and doctorate from Harvard University. She became the first female professor at Fairfield University in 1963. She died on July 31, 2011, at the age of 86.

Walters was born in Providence, graduated Lincoln School in 1942. Walters started in economics research, first with the Board of Governors of the Federal Reserve System in Washington, DC, and then with Citibank in New York. She became Fairfield's first female faculty member in 1963. At Fairfield, Waters taught courses in banking, finance, international trade and government policy. She retired in 1996 as professor emerita.

== Works ==
- Walters, Joan G. (February 1970). "Is the one-bank holding company doomed?". Financial Review. 5 (1): 320–330. doi:10.1111/j.1540-6288.1970.tb01471.x-i1.
- Walters, Joan G. (May 1975). "Session Topic: Diversification of Commercial Bank and Nonbanking Activities: Discussion". The Journal of Finance. 30 (2): 303–305. doi:10.2307/2978716. JSTOR 2978716.
