= Jane Njoki Mugambi =

Kenyan political advisor (born 1967)

- Born: 23 December 1967 (age 58); Gituamba Village, Central Province, Kenya
- Other name: Jane Kimemia Mugambi
- Citizenship: Kenyan
- Education: University of Nairobi (BA in Political Science); Kenyatta University (MBA in Human Resource Management); Dedan Kimathi University of Technology (PhD in Business Administration and Management)
- Occupations: Political advisor Civil servant
- Awards: Order of the Grand Warrior (OGW)

Jane Njoki Mugambi (sometimes known as Jane Kimemia Mugambi) was born 23 December 1967 in Gituamba Village, Central Province, Kenya. She was the principal advisor to the president of Kenya, sector cabinet secretaries, principal secretaries and boards and chief executive officers of state-owned entities on matters relating to the governance and management matters of state corporations.

She is currently the Policy Advisor to the Cabinet Secretary for the Ministry of Interior and Coordination of National Government of Kenya, Secretary for the Project Implementation for the National Development Implementation Communication Cabinet Committee, Principal Administrative Secretary and Secretary (Technical) Coordination in the Ministry of Interior and coordination of the National Coordination of the Government of Kenya.

== Biography ==
Mugambi, holds a Bachelor of Arts degree in political science from the University of Nairobi; Lower Division, a Master's Degree in Business Administration in Human Resource Management from Kenyatta University and a Doctorate in Business Administration and Management from Dedan Kimathi University of Technology, Kenya.

From 17 September 2002 to 29 December 2005, Mugambi served as Secretary from 13 September 1999 to 13 September 2002. Beginning on 29 December 2005 to 20 February 2007, she served as the Deputy Registrar, human resource and administration from 17 September 2002 to 29 December 2005.

Before joining the Public Service, Jane served at the Kenya Methodist University for 14 years where she rose to the position of Principal Nairobi Campus. Specifically, she was an Associate Principal of The Academic Satellite Centre in Nairobi City, Nairobi Region, with additional responsibility for other centres at Nakuru City, Rift Valley Region, Nyeri Town, Central Region and Mombasa City, Coast Region as the human resource administrator manager, reporting to the deputy vice chancellor of academic affairs.

She served as chief executive officer Secretary of State's Corporations Advisory Committee Between 15 March 2013 to 14 October 2019 and was the secretary to the Presidential Task Force on Parastatal Reforms (Head of Secretariat) between 23 July 2013 to 9 October 2013. She was the secretary to the Presidential Committee on Implementation of Parastatal Reforms (Head of Secretariat) and served as the chairperson on the Taskforce on Developing a Handbook for State Owned Entities on Corporate Ethics and Business Integrity (Spearhead Reform Continentally), and led Kenya to gain admission to the Organization for Economic Development and Cooperation (OECD) as a member of the State Owned Entities Network for Southern Africa.

She is a member of the Institute of Human Resources Management of Kenya and The Chartered Institute of Marketing in the United Kingdom. She receive the award of the Order of Grand Warrior by His Excellency the president of the Republic of Kenya.

== Personal life ==
Jane Njoki Mugambi is a widow and was married to Professor Mutuma Mugambi. She is the mother of Ivan Mwaniki Mutitika, Sonia Nkatha Mugambi, Mwiti Mutuma Mugambi and Kimemia Mutuma Mugambi.
