= Jane Rooney =

Architect in New Zealand

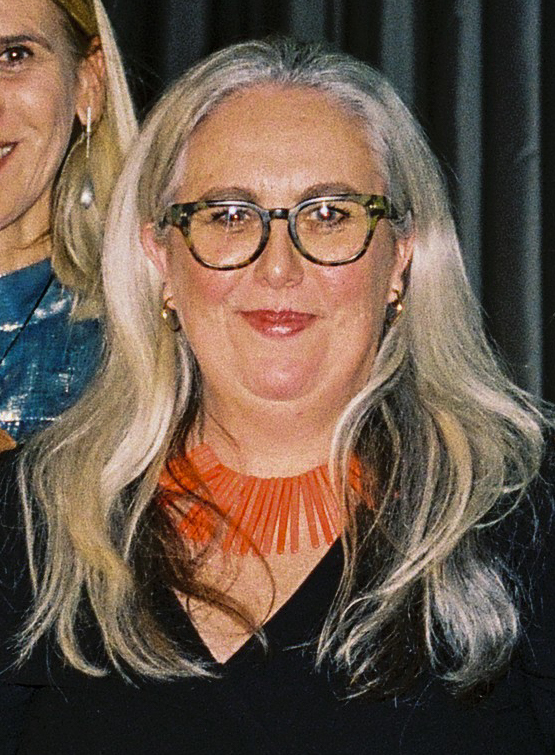
- Rooney in 2023
- Born: Christchurch, New Zealand
- Occupation: Architect

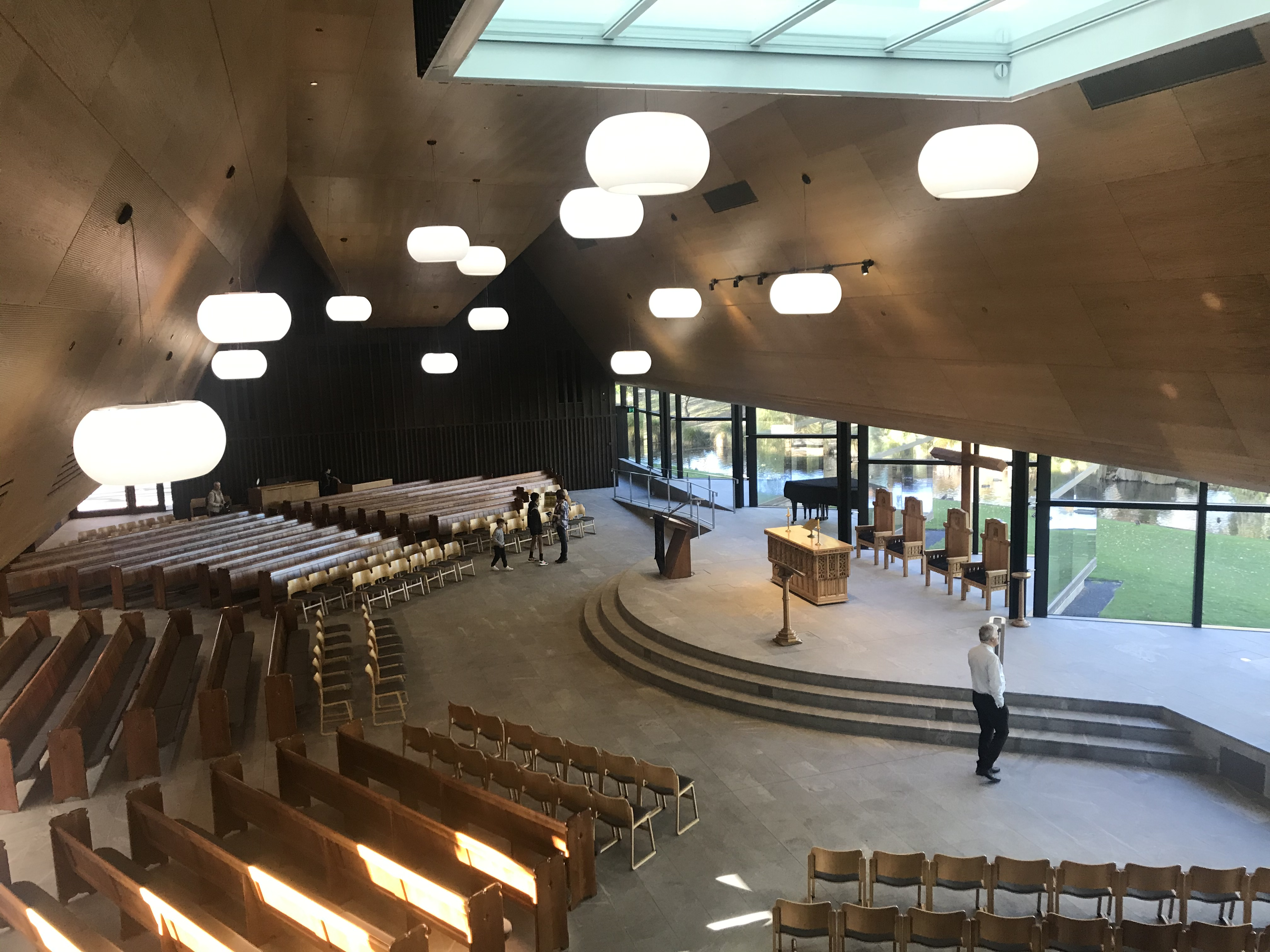
Interior of the St Andrew's College Centennial Chapel

Jane Rooney is a New Zealand architect who led the project for the award-winning St. Andrew's College Centennial Chapel.

== Biography ==
Rooney grew up in Christchurch and attended Villa Maria College. She worked in the United Kingdom for ten years, on commercial and mixed-use developments.

Rooney was one of the group who established a Christchurch branch of Architecture + Women New Zealand. In 2013, she was one of the co-leaders of the group's RE-THINK exhibition.

In 2014, she joined Christchurch architecture firm Architectus. Rooney was project architect for the St. Andrew's College Centennial Chapel, which won the Public Architecture Award at the 2018 Canterbury Architecture Awards and the Future Heritage Award at the 2018 Canterbury Heritage Awards.

In 2019, she was appointed to the New Zealand Registered Architects Board assessors panel and in 2021 she became a Fellow of Te Kāhui Whaihanga New Zealand Institute of Architects.
