= Jane Madders =

British physiotherapist and author

- Madders in 1981
- Born: Jane Solkhon c. 1909
- Died: October 1990 (aged 81); Birmingham
- Education: Chelsea College of Physical Education
- Occupations: Physiotherapist, health educator, author
- Notable work: Stress and Relaxation (1979); Relax: The Relief of Tension Through Muscle Control (1973)
- Spouse: Max Madders
- Children: 2

Jane Madders (née Solkhon; c. 1909–1990) was a British physiotherapist, health educator and author known for her expertise in relaxation techniques. After receiving training in physical relaxation during the late 1920s, Madders developed an interest in using her skills to assist pregnant women; she taught relaxation skills at antenatal classes and midwife courses, and published a book of exercises for women in 1955.

Madders organized a "family club" for mothers and children in the early 1950s, which helped mothers learn parenthood skills through group discussions and lectures while their children played; she credited it with being the first formal children's play group in Britain. During the 1960s, Madders was senior lecturer for a college course in "Health Education and Personal Relationships" that was unique for its time in Britain. She taught relaxation techniques at a migraine clinic and conducted research into the effectiveness of relaxation training in helping migraine patients.

After supporting the creation of the first relaxation charity in Britain and broadcasting a successful series of radio talks on You and Yours in 1972, Madders went on to publish three books on relaxation techniques, including Stress and Relaxation (1979), which was translated into multiple languages. She continued to teach classes after retirement. Scholar Ayesha Nathoo notes that Madders was a key figure in the development of British public perception of relaxation as "a therapeutic skill that required professional instruction" during the 20th century.

== Education ==
In 1927, Jane Madders learned physical relaxation techniques at the Chelsea College of Physical Education. She completed training as a physical education teacher and physiotherapist, with one of her teachers being F. Matthias Alexander, who had developed the therapeutic Alexander Technique.

== Career ==
Madders began working as a physiotherapist. After meeting obstetrician Grantly Dick-Reed and finding his work in support of natural childbirth impressive, Madders was inspired to offer relaxation training to pregnant women; she had prior knowledge of safe childbirth practices from her schooling and was determined to use her physiotherapy skills to help reduce women's suffering during labour. She obtained permission from the Lordswood Maternity Hospital to teach relaxation at their antenatal classes, and she volunteered her time at these classes for a year to see how effective the results might be. The success of this initiative led Madders to expand her relaxation training, and she taught training courses for midwives in Birmingham. In 1951, the Birmingham branch of the Obstetric Physiotherapists Association featured Madders' work in a residential training course on relaxation, attended by physiotherapists from across Britain. She published her first book in 1955: a short collection of exercises for women entitled Before and After Childbirth.

During the 1950s, Madders also did occasional radio broadcast work, first under the pseudonym "Mary Orchard" and then under her own name. She was the introducer of the regular Women's Hour programme serving the Midlands, and she also contributed items to the English Magazine programme for overseas listeners. Around 1952, Madders organized a "family club" in Birmingham, where mothers could learn relaxation techniques and bring their children to play together. The women held regular group discussions about family relationships and parenthood and sometimes brought in guest lecturers such as doctors, teachers, and educational psychologists. They also operated a clothing and toy exchange and organized an on-call "flying squad" of members who could help out mothers in need of emergency childcare or other assistance. Within 18 months of the club's creation, its funding and financial responsibility was taken on by the local government education authority, and by 1959, club membership had risen to include almost 100 local families. The Family Club was later credited by Madders as being the earliest formal children's play group in Britain.

In 1966, when the City of Birmingham College of Education launched a new year-long training course in "Health Education and Personal Relationships", Madders was put in charge of the course as senior lecturer. The course, which was unique within British education at the time, provided school teachers with improved skills for helping students navigate physical, mental, and social health issues. During the 1960s, Madders also taught relaxation techniques to patients referred to her by a migraine clinic in Birmingham. She spent six years conducting research for a study on migraines. Completing this study with a family doctor named K. M. Hay, Madders provided annual group relaxation training sessions to a total of 98 migraine patients between 1965 and 1970. Each relaxation session was followed by small group discussions about migraine symptoms and experiences. Madders and Hay reported that 69 of their patients had demonstrated improvement by experiencing fewer or milder cases of migraines after the treatment.

In the early 1970s, Madders supported the establishment of Relaxation for Living, the first relaxation charity in Britain. Working with the organization's founder, Amber Lloyd, Madders spearheaded training for Relaxation for Living teachers, provided technical advice and national publicity for their work, and eventually served as chairwoman for the organization. After Madders broadcast a successful series of talks about relaxation on You and Yours in 1972, the BBC published her book Relax: The Relief of Tension Through Muscle Control (1973) alongside a cassette tape of her talks. Over the next decade, she published the book Stress and Relaxation (1979), which went on to be translated into multiple languages, and Relax and Be Happy (1987), which was directed towards parents, teachers and young adults to help children cope with stress.

In 1982, Madders was working as a physiotherapist at Charing Cross Hospital and giving talks on stress at seminars for medical professionals, and in 1988 she presented a six-part television series for ITV entitled Stress. She continued to teach relaxation classes after retirement.

== Personal life ==
Madders was married to Max Madders, a physical education lecturer at Birmingham University; he coached Olympic swimmers and wrote several books on swimming. The couple had two sons.

== Death and legacy ==
Jane Madders died in October 1990 in Birmingham, at the age of 81. She had begun collecting interview material for a book about British life in the 1920s and did not finish it before her death, but her sister Grace Horseman completed the manuscript, and Growing Up in the Twenties was published in 1993.

In her study of the history of therapeutic relaxation in the United Kingdom, scholar Ayesha Nathoo concludes that Madders was key to the development of British public perception of relaxation as "a therapeutic skill that required professional instruction" during the 20th century, responding to the existing demand for instruction and generating new public interest in relaxation skill training and resources.

== Works ==
=== Books ===
- Madders, Jane (1955). Before and After Childbirth: Ante-Natal and Postnatal Exercises. Livingstone.
- ————— (1973). Relax: The Relief of Tension Through Muscle Control. British Broadcasting Corporation. ISBN 9780563124641.
- ————— (1979). Stress and Relaxation. Martin Dunitz. ISBN 9780906348017.
- ————— (1987). Relax and Be Happy. Unwin. ISBN 9780046490430.
- Madders, Jane; Horseman, Grace (1993). Growing Up in the Twenties. Cottage Publishing. ISBN 9781897785010.

=== Articles and book chapters ===
- Madders, Jane (December 1955). "The Harborne Family Club". Health Education Journal. 13 (4): 246–249. doi:10.1177/001789695501300407.
- Hay, K. M.; Madders, Jane (November 1971). "Migraine Treated by Relaxation Therapy". The Journal of the Royal College of General Practitioners. 21 (112): 664–669. PMC 2156594. PMID 5144384.
- Madders, Jane (1979). "Group Relaxation in the Treatment of Migraine: a Multifactorial Approach". In McGuigan, F. J.; Sime, Wesley E.; MacDonald Wallace, J. (eds.). Stress and Tension Control. Plenum Press. pp. 141–145.
- Madders, Jane (1989). "Introducing Relaxation Methods to Young Children". In McGuigan, F. J.; Sime, Wesley E.; MacDonald Wallace, J. (eds.). Stress and Tension Control 3: Stress Management. Plenum Press. pp. 201–208.
