= Joan Bodger =

American writer

- Born: 31 August 1923; San Francisco, California, United States
- Died: 4 July 2002 (aged 78); Tofino, British Columbia, Canada
- Education: Pomona College
- Occupations: Author, storyteller, educator

Joan Bodger (31 August 1923 – 4 July 2002) was an American writer, storyteller and educator.

== Biography ==
Bodger was born Joan Higbee in San Francisco in 1923. During World War II she was a cryptographer in the Signal corps of the Women's Army Corps, rising to the rank of staff sergeant. She married John Charles Bodger in 1947, with whom she had two children, Ian Corfield Bodger and Lucy Stanton Bodger. Their marriage ended in 1963. In 1970, she married Alan Mercer.

From 1963 to 1968, Bodger taught at various institutions in New York. In 1968, she was director of children's services for the State Library of Missouri, but was fired "after being branded a 'communist pornographer' for publicly supporting an underground newspaper." The next year, Bennett Cerf hired her to work as a children's book editor at Random House.

In 1970, she moved to Toronto. From 1970 to 1975, she was program director of the Mini-Skools day care program in Manitoba and Ontario. She helped found the Toronto Storytellers School and was actively involved with the storytelling community in the city.

Bodger's first book was How the Heather Looks: A Joyous Journey to the British Sources of Children's Books (1960), which told of a summer visit to England where she and her family sought the locations of classic children's stories, such as written by Rudyard Kipling, A. A. Milne, Arthur Ransome and others. Soon after, her "daughter, Lucy, died at the age of seven, her first husband became schizophrenic, and their son disappeared in the streets of San Francisco."

== Bibliography ==
- How the Heather Looks: A Joyous Journey to the British Sources of Children's Books (Viking, 1965)
- Clever-Lazy: The Girl Who Invented Herself (Atheneum, 1979)
- Belinda's Bell (Atheneum, 1981)
- The Forest Family (Tundra Books, 1999)
- The Crack in the Teacup: The Life of an Old Woman Steeped in Stories (McClelland & Stewart, 2000)
- Tales of Court and Castle (Tundra Books, 2003)
