= Joanie =

Joanie or Joannie is a feminine given name which may refer to:

People:

- Joanie Bartels (born 1953), American children's music singer and songwriter
- Joanie Keller, American country music singer
- Joanie Mackowski (born 1963), American poet
- Joanie Madden, Irish-American flute and whistle player of Irish traditional music
- Joanne Joanie Mahoney (born 1965), American politician, first woman County Executive of Onondaga County, New York
- Joannie Rochette (born 1986), Canadian figure skater
- Joanie Sommers, American singer and actress born Joan Drost in 1941
- Joanie or Joan Weston (1935–1997), American roller derby skater

Fictional characters:

- Joanie Caucus, in the comic strip Doonesbury
- Joanie Cunningham, on the American TV series Happy Days
- Joanie Taylor, on the British TV series The Catherine Tate Show
- Joanie Wright, on the British soap opera Emmerdale

== See also ==
- Joan (given name)
- Joni (disambiguation)
