= Joan Morgan (entomologist) =

British entomologist

Joan Morgan FRES
- Born: 25 September 1921; Halifax, West Yorkshire, England
- Died: 28 December 1998 (aged 77); Bangor, Gwynedd, Wales
- Other names: Margaret Joan Morgan; M. Joan Morgan; M.J. Morgan
- Education: University of Liverpool
- Occupations: Entomologist; Teacher
- Spouse: Hugh Richard Lloyd Morgan
- Children: 3
- Scientific career
- Workplaces: Douglas High School for Girls (IOM); Bangor University

Margaret Joan Morgan F.R.E.S. (1921–1998), known as Joan Morgan, was a British entomologist. Morgan worked for most of her career at Bangor University and made a comprehensive reference collection of insects from Britain, particularly North Wales, which is now in the care of Museum Wales.

== Biography ==
Morgan was born at Halifax, West Yorkshire on 25 September 1921, to Welsh journalist Trevor Emrys Morgan and Muriel Morgan (née Tillotson), who had married in 1920. Morgan had two younger sisters.

Morgan attended Princess Mary High School in Halifax and then studied for a biology B.Sc. degree at the University of Liverpool, graduating in 1942. Morgan later donated extracts from her wartime diaries to the university's archives.

Morgan began her working life as biology mistress at Douglas High School for Girls on the Isle of Man.

In 1944, at Southowram, Morgan married her cousin, Hugh Richard Lloyd Morgan of the Royal Naval Reserve (1921–2009). The couple had three children. While looking after her young family, Morgan taught part time at her former school in Halifax and also worked towards a Master of Science degree with her specialist subject being water midges (Chironomidae). In 1946, Morgan was made a Fellow of the Royal Entomological Society.

In 1953, the Morgan family relocated to North Wales and Morgan worked as a technical college teacher before moving to the zoology department of Bangor University in the late 1950s. Working with generations of students, Morgan gradually enhanced the university's reference collection of insects and made a record-card system for occurrence data.

Morgan was one of the founder members of the North Wales Wildlife Trust, which began in 1963 as the North Wales Naturalist's Trust. Throughout her life, Morgan advocated that habitat conservation was essential to preserving insect diversity:

"The biggest threat to insects is the destruction of habitats of all kinds. When marshes are drained you lose all the associated plants and animals. The destruction of woodlands in North Wales is also a concern." Joan Morgan, 1987

Morgan was sometimes called for advice concerning public health matters: in May 1966, Morgan prepared testimony to defend a café owner from Conwy who had been accused of baking a pie contaminated by a fly. Morgan, with the assistance of a confectioner, baked her own pies containing dead flies, using the same bakery as the café. The flies in Morgan's cooked pies appeared different compared to the shiny and upturned wings from the fly that was seen in the original pie, suggesting that the food contamination had occurred outside the bakery and may not have been the fault of the café owner. In the end the case was dismissed due to administrative errors, but Morgan's fly-pie baking attracted attention in the press. In 1993, Morgan was consulted about beetles found in dried coriander seeds at Caernarfon which were suspected to be Khapra beetles.

Once she had retired from her teaching job in 1988, Morgan continued to curate, and contribute to, the insect collection at Bangor.

After a period of illness, Morgan died on 28 December 1998.

Morgan's insect collection, comprising around 50,000 specimens with associated data, was transferred from Bangor University to Museum Wales in 2007.

== Selected works ==
- 1949: Notes on the Morphology of Some Species of Tanypodinae (Diptera Chironomidae): Proceedings of the Royal Entomological Society of London. Series A, General Entomology: Volume 24: Issues 4-6: pages 39–45
- 1989: (with William S. Lacey): The Nature of North Wales: The Wildlife and Ecology of Gwynedd and Clwyd Incorporating the Original Counties of Anglesey, Caernarfon, Merioneth, Denbigh and Flint: publisher: Barracuda Books.
- 1990: Insects of Anglesey: part of A New Natural History of Anglesey, ed. Dr Hugh Efion-Jones, pub. Anglesey Antiquarian Society.
- 1994: Morgan was the major contributor of Welsh records (about 95%) to Colin W. Plant's Provisional Atlas of the Lacewings and Allied Insects (Neuroptera, Megaloptera, Raphidioptera, and Mecoptera) of Britain and Ireland: publisher: Biological Records Centre, NERC Institute of Terrestrial Ecology.
