= Joan S. Whitmore =

South African hydrologist (1922-2002)

Joan Sydney Whitmore
- Born: Joan Sydney Whitmore; 1922
- Died: 2002 (aged 79–80)
- Scientific career
- Fields: Hydrologist
- Institutions: University of Pretoria

Joan Sydney Whitmore (1922–2002) was a South African hydrologist specialising in agriculture and water. She wrote a book about drought management on farmland, and many reports on water and agriculture, during her career as a government scientist. She had risen to the rank of Director by 1972, which was an unusual achievement for a woman at that time.

== Career ==
Joan Whitmore worked in the South African Agroclimatological Research Unit from 1946 until 1958, when she joined the Department of Water Affairs hydrological section. She was the driving force behind the formation of the Hydrological Research Institute at Roodeplaat Dam, and was its first director from 1972 until her retirement in 1977. She became a consultant in applied climatology and hydrology and lectured at the University of Pretoria. She was involved with the 1999 International Conference on Drought Management in Pretoria. She became an active member of Soroptimist International

== Works ==
- Whitmore, Joan (1948). Agro-climatology (Technical report). Union of South Africa.
- Whitmore, Joan (1961). "Agrohydrology". South African Geographical Journal. 43 (1): 68–74. Bibcode:1961SAfGJ..43...68W. doi:10.1080/03736245.1961.10559366.
- Whitmore, Joan (1961). The Hydrological Cycle past present and future (Technical report). Vol. TR23. Department of Water Affairs.
- Whitmore, Joan (1967). Effects of catchment management on river flow characteristics (Technical report). Vol. TR39. Department of Water Affairs.
- Whitmore, Joan (1967). The influence of locality factors on mean annual rainfall (Technical report). Vol. TR40. Department of Water Affairs.
- Whitmore, Joan (1971). "South Africa's water budget". South African Journal of Science. 67 (3): 166–176.
- Whitmore, Joan (1975). Land-use planning to improve water yield of catchments (Technical report). Vol. TR54. Department of Water Affairs.
- Whitmore, Joan (2000). Drought management on farmland. Kluwer Academic Publishers.

== Awards ==
- Department of Water Affairs Women in Water Award, 2003, posthumously.

== Legacy ==
The Joan Whitmore bursary for female students registered for postgraduate study in environmental studies at the University of Pretoria
