= Joan Cwaik =

Argentinian Technology essayist (b. 1990)

Joan Milton Cwaik
- Born: June 19, 1990 (age 36); Buenos Aires, Argentina
- Education: Austral University; Universidad Argentina de la Empresa (UADE); Buenos Aires University
- Occupations: Technology communicator, essayist, professor, speaker and marketing strategist
- Known for: Head of Marketing for Latin America at Maytronics Ltd. Professor at San Andrés University
- Notable work: Author of 7R: Seven technological revolutions that will transform our lives The Human Dilemma: From Homo Sapiens to Homo Tech; Post-tech: skills to recover what is human The algorithm: Who decides for us? The fifth power: How digital citizenship can reinvent democracy
- Website: https://joancwaik.com/

Joan Milton Cwaik (born June 19, 1990, in Buenos Aires) is an Argentinian technology communicator, essayist, professor, speaker and marketing strategist. In 2020 he published his first book 7R: Las siete revoluciones tecnológicas que transformarán nuestra vida (7R: The seven tech revolutions that will change our life'). In 2021 he released his second book, El Dilema Humano: Del Homo Sapiens al Homo Tech (The Human Dilemma: From Homo Sapiens to Homo Tech). In 2024 his third book was released. It is called Postecnológicos: Habilidades para recuperar lo humano (Post-tech: skills to recover what is human). In 2025 he published the books El algoritmo: ¿quién decide por nosotros? (The algorithm: Who decides for us?) and El quinto poder: Cómo la ciudadanía digital puede reinventar la democracia (The fifth power: How digital citizenship can reinvent democracy).

== Career ==
Joan Cwaik was born in 1990 and had a BA in Media and Entertainment Management at Universidad Argentina de la Empresa (UADE), where between 2016 and 2020 he was professor, did research and has coordinated its Technologic Communication Center. In 2013 he obtained a postgraduate degree in Multimedia Convergence at Buenos Aires University. He has an MBA from the IAE Business School of the Austral University from Argentina.

In 2013 he was part of the communication team of the Net Party, a political party that proposes an online form of liquid democracy, founded by the entrepreneur Santiago Siri. He is also part of the NGO Bitcoin Argentina, which promotes the blockchain and bitcoin technology in that country.

Since 2025 Cwaik is the Head of Marketing for Latin America at Maytronics Ltd., an Israeli company which develops robotic pool cleaners. When he was Marketing Manager for Latin America, in 2016, he had coordinated the production and staging of the Aquadance, the aquatic acrobatic contest of the TV show Showmatch hosted by Marcelo Tinelli.

In 2016 the President of Argentina Mauricio Macri called him ‘groundbreaker’ and ‘alarmist’ when he said that in the near future new technologies will replace traditional jobs. He affirmed so during an encounter of the J-6, the version for youngsters of the G-6 Group, which unites the main Argentine business entities such as the Argentine Industrial Union, the Buenos Aires Stock Exchange, the Argentine Construction Chamber, the Argentine Chamber of Commerce, and the Argentine Rural Society.

As speaker and lecturer, he has participated in Campus Party Argentina, Red Innova Buenos Aires, eMerge Americas (Miami), Sinergia Latin America (Mexico), The World of Ideas, PechaKucha Night Buenos Aires, Tecnomoda and TEDx, the local edition of the TED talks. In 2015 he was appointed Ambassador of Social Media Day Argentina, an event on social networks and digital communications.

During the 2018 G20 Buenos Aires summit, he was part of the Argentine delegation and one of the speakers of the G20 Young Entrepreneurs Alliance (G20 YEA), a summit that has brought together young entrepreneurs and political leaders from all over the world.

In 2020 Penguin Random House published his first book '7R: Las siete revoluciones tecnológicas que transformarán nuestra vida' ('7R: The seven tech revolutions that will change our life'). The book was declared 'National Interest' by the Argentinean Parliament.

Also in 2020, he became part of the so-called Assembly of the Future, a counsel organised by Perfil Publishing for journalist advice.

In 2021 he released his second book, El Dilema Humano: Del Homo Sapiens al Homo Tech (The Human Dilemma: From Homo Sapiens to Homo Tech) about how technology will change humanity in a post-pandemic world. The book was declared an interest by Buenos Aires City Legislature.

Since 2023, Cwaik has served as coordinator and professor of the Emerging Technologies Program and has taught in the MBA and Master’s in Human Resources programs at the University of San Andrés.

In 2024 he published his third book, Postecnológicos: Habilidades para recuperar lo humano (Post-tech: skills to recover what is human), which analyzes how human beings can improve their relationship with technology in a highly modernized world. This book was also recognized as of interest to Social Communication by Buenos Aires City Legislature.

In 2025, Joan released two books under Planeta. The first, titled El algoritmo: ¿quién decide por nosotros? (The Algorithm: Who Decides for Us?), explores the growing influence of algorithms and artificial intelligence on everyday human decisions and experiences. A review published in the academic journal Divulgatio describes the book as a first-person examination of how algorithms shape social practices, from personal relationships and politics to entertainment and consumption.The book was recognized as of interest to Social Communication by Buenos Aires City Legislature.

The same year was released El quinto poder: Cómo la ciudadanía digital puede reinventar la democracia (The fifth power: How digital citizenship can reinvent democracy), co-written with Argentine politician Martín Yeza and featuring a foreword by Mauricio Macri. The book was recognized as of interest by the Senate of the Mendoza province.

As a technology expert, he collaborates in different media, such as the newspapers Infobae, Clarín, La Nación, Perfil and Uruguay's El Observador, C5N, TN and LN+ TV channels, FM Milenium and FM Rock & Pop radios, #TengoCapturas show at La Casa streaming channel and the news agency Télam.

== Awards and honours ==
In 2015 the Apertura magazine and Red Innova chose him as one of the forty most influential and innovative entrepreneurs in Argentina.

Cwaik was considered in 2017 by Forbes magazine as one of the young people under 35 years of greatest impact in Argentina for his work in exponential and disruptive technologies. The magazine called them the '3i Generation'.

In 2019 he was recognised by the National Institute of Youth of Argentina and the International Youth Organism as one of the most distinguished young men of that year.

In 2020 he was chosen as one of the 120 Spanish-speaking "Future Leaders" by an IA and machine-learning technology developed by the communication agency Llorente y Cuenca.

In October 2026, the Argentine Society for Artificial Intelligence (SAIA) recognized him for his contributions to technology communication.

== Bibliography ==
- 7R: Las siete revoluciones tecnológicas que transformarán nuestra vida (2020)
- El Dilema Humano: Del Homo Sapiens al Homo Tech (2021)
- Postecnológicos: Habilidades para recuperar lo humano (2024)
- El algoritmo: ¿Quién decide por nosotros? (2025)
- El quinto poder: Cómo la ciudadanía digital puede reinventar la democracia (co-written with Martín Yeza) (2025)
