= Joan Wall (field hockey) =

Joan Florence Wall (née Barnett) (10 October 1933 – 5 February 2023) was an English field hockey player, school teacher and sports administrator. She played for the England women's national team on 14 occasions between 1959 and 1960 and was part of the team that won the 1959 Women's IFWHA World Conference in Amsterdam. Wall was an athletics coach in Nottinghamshire and was an athletics county champion in the 100 yards, 220 yards, 440 yards and long jump events. She was a sports administrator, serving as president of the Midlands Women Amateur Athletics Association and Nottinghamshire WAAA and the Midlands WAAA and secretary of the joint men's and women's Nottinghamshire County Hockey Association.

== Biography ==
Wall was born on 10 October 1933, in Rotherhithe, South East London. She was the only child of the electrical engineer Henry Barnett and his wife Florence (née Morrow). In 1939, Wall was evacuated to Rothley, Leicestershire but returned to Orpington near the border with Kent following The Blitz. She was educated at Bromley County Grammar School and later trained to be a teacher at Battersea Teacher Training College in South East London. She took up field hockey after gaining inspiration from her gym teacher in her early adolescent years. and was coached by England international Kathleen Laurie. Wall played for Atalanta club and was selected by the Kent Schools for the 1949–1950 season, East Juniors from 1951 to 1954 and the Kent 1st XI in 1955, playing in a seven-a-side exhibition match at the 1951 Festival of Britain when she was aged 17. She also set county records in the 100 yards, 200 yards and 400 yards athletics events in Kent during the 1950s.

Between 1952 and 1955, Wall represented the London Universities in athletics, competing with a team during the 1954 Whitsuntide in Paris. She later represented Kent as a sprinter from 1954 to 1955. Wall moved to Nottingham, becoming a games and domestic science teacher at Scotholme Secondary Girls' School. She became captain of the Nottingham Athletics Club ladies hockey team and joined the Sherwood Hockey Club. Wall earned awards as coach of the Women's Amateur Athletic Association of England's (AAA) Nottingham Athletics Club for the high jump and relays was coach-manager of the Nottingham City Girls athletics team for those between the ages of 11 and 15. She was a champion in the 100 yards open handicap for women in 1956. In 1958, Wall broke the 220 yards country record and broke the 440 yards county record at that year's Nottingham County Championships. She was secretary of the Nottingham Women's Athletic Association in 1959.

Having played for the England further reserves and the England B teams from 1956 to 1958, she was selected to play for the England women's national team for the squad's tour of West Germany in 1958. Wall taught cooking at Church Drive Secondary School for Girls in North East Nottingham in the same year. She earned her first cap in March 1959, playing against Scotland. Wall later played against South Africa and was a member of the English touring team that won the 1959 Women's IFWHA World Conference (the forerunner of the Women's FIH Hockey World Cup) in Amsterdam. She became champion in the 100 yards, 220 yards, 440 yards and long jump events at the Nottingham Women's AAA County Championships. That same year, Wall was appointed captain of Sherwood Hockey Club. She retained her 220-yard, 440 yard and long jump titles at the 1960 Nottingham Women's AAA County Championships but lost her 100-yard title. Wall earned the 100 yard title at the inter-club athletic contests that same year. Wall stopped playing for England in 1960 after earning 14 caps and was not part of a team that lost a match; she won 13 matches and drew 1. In 1964, she secured her fifth 440 yards county title, and for the sixth time the following year.

She took some time away from teaching in the 1960s to raise her children before returning to the profession. In 1961, Wall founded the Sherwood Juniors hockey club, the first club in England for those between the ages of 15 and 18. In April 1971, she established her second club, Carlton Ladies Hockey Club (later renamed to Redhill Ladies), to play in the Nottingham League. Wall was appointed secretary of the new joint men's and women's Nottinghamshire County Hockey Association when the building of sports halls allowed for the playing of indoor hockey in the 1970s. She was chairman of the Midlands Indoor chairman from 1977 to 1987 and was an England Indoor selector for ten years, seven of them as chairman. Wall was appointed president of the Midlands Women Amateur Athletics Association and Nottinghamshire WAAA and the Midlands WAAA in 1987. She served on the executive committee and the Strategy and Investment Panel of the East Midlands Federation of Sport and Recreation and the East Midlands Regional Sports Council.

Wall took early retirement from teaching in 1989. She was a food advisor for Sainsbury's until 1998. Wall was also a Census official, and volunteered at The Hockey Museum in Woking, Surrey. Wall was the author of indoor hockey and began compiling a list of every field hockey club in England since the first one was established in 1871.

== Personal life ==
She was married to the teacher and sports coach Leslie Wall from 1955 until their divorce in 1988. There were two children of the marriage. Wall died of complications from dementia on 5 February 2023. Her funeral was held at Aldershot Crematorium on 16 March 2023.

== Playing style ==
Wall usually played in the half back position. She was an early adopter of the Indian-head hockey stick, which features a shorter head length and allowed for better control of the ball.
