= Janie (given name) =

Janie is a feminine given name, often a diminutive form of Jane, and a nickname. It may refer to:

== People ==
- Janie Allan (1868–1968), Scottish suffragette
- Janie Porter Barrett (1865–1948), American social reformer, educator and welfare worker
- Janie Bradford (born 1939), American songwriter
- Katherine Jane Bryant (born 1974), American television costume designer known professionally as Janie Bryant
- Janie Dee (born 1962), English actress and singer
- Katherine Ellice (1813–1864), British diarist and artist
- Janie Finlay, Australian politician
- Janie Fricke (born 1947), American country music singer
- Janie Lou Gibbs (1932–2010), American serial killer
- Janie Jones, stage name of English singer Marion Mitchell (born 1941)
- Janie Marèse (1908–1931), French film actress born Jeanne Marie Thérèse Bugnot
- Jane Janie Sell (born 1941), American actress
- Janie Taylor, American ballet dancer, former New York City Ballet principal dancer
- Janie Shores (1932–2017), American retired judge, first woman judge on the Supreme Court of Alabama
- Janie Tienphosuwan (born 1981), Thai actress and model
- Janie Tsao (born Wu Chien in 1953), Taiwanese-born American entrepreneur and hardware engineer, co-founder of Linksys
- Elizabeth Jane Janie Wagstaff (born 1974), American former swimmer
- Janie Ward-Engelking (fl. 2012–present), American politician

== Music ==
- "Janie", a song by Ethel Cain from the album Willoughby Tucker, I'll Always Love You

== Fictional characters ==
- Janie Johnson, the protagonist of the Janie Johnson series of young adult novels
- Janie Mae Crawford, the protagonist of Their Eyes Were Watching God

== See also ==
- Jean (disambiguation)
- Jeannie (disambiguation)
- Jeanine
