= Jane Venis =

New Zealand artist and musician

Jane Venis is a New Zealand multimedia artist, musician and writer. She focuses on the "absurdities and concerns of contemporary popular culture," which she chooses to show through objects, video, sound and performance works.

== Biography ==
Venis gained a Master of Fine Arts from the Dunedin School of Art, and then a PhD in Fine Arts from Queensland College of Art, Griffith University, Australia.

Venis taught 'Music Making' night classes in the 1980s and has made musical instruments since 2001. She is currently Professor of Creative Studies in the School of Design at Otago Polytechnic, and she teaches in undergraduate and postgraduate programmes.

Venis describes her work as "crafted assemblage" and creates musical instruments from reworked scrap and rubbish materials. Her work references the Japanese art of Chindogu - objects freed from the chains of usefulness.

== Notable exhibitions ==
- Dual, 2020 at the CICA Museum. A joint show with Hannah Joynt featuring video, drawing and audio works recorded in real time.
- Drawn to Sound, 2019 at Ashburton Art Gallery. This joint show with Hannah Joynt as part of the Summer Season series featured multimedia and performance-based works. Earlier in 2019 Venis and Joynt undertook a residency in Portugal at the Buinho Creative Hub.
- The Lost Object Ensemble, 2016 at Forrester Gallery in Dunedin. This exhibition featured a collection of musical instruments made from found materials.
- Gymnaseum, 2011 at Dunedin Public Art Gallery.
- Chindogu exhibition as part of the Dunedin Fringe Festival, 2009.
- The Blathering, Gossiping about Gossip, 2003 at Blue Oyster Art Project Space, Dunedin.
