= Joan Gomberg =

American research geophysicist

- Education: Massachusetts Institute of Technology; University of California, San Diego
- Known for: Seismology
- Scientific career
- Workplaces: University of Washington; United States Geological Survey

Joan S. Gomberg (born 1957) is a research geophysicist at the United States Geological Survey. She serves as an adjunct professor at the University of Washington. She is interested in subduction zone science, and studies how earthquakes trigger each other and how faults can slip. Gomberg is a Fellow of the American Geophysical Union. She was the first person to demonstrate how dynamic stress associated with seismic waves can trigger other earthquakes.

== Early life and education ==
Gomberg studied geophysics at Massachusetts Institute of Technology and graduated with a bachelor's degree in 1979. She moved to California for her graduate studies, earning a PhD in 1989. Gomberg held postdoctoral fellowships at University of California, San Diego and University of Nevada, Reno. She was awarded a Gilbert Fellowship in 1993.

== Research and career ==
Gomberg joined the United States Geological Survey in 1988. She completed visiting research projects in New Zealand and Italy. At the United States Geological Survey, Gomberg has worked in Colorado, Memphis, and Seattle. In Memphis Gomberg worked on intraplate earthquakes. When she moved to Seattle, which is on a subduction zones. She specialises in earthquake seismology for the Earthquake Hazards Program in the Pacific Northwest. She uses 1-hertz Global Positioning System to monitor seismic waves, as well as high frequency GPS to study ground motion. Gomberg demonstrated that earthquake aftershock are triggered by dynamic stress. She showed that dynamic stresses do not permanently change the applied load, but trigger earthquakes by changing the mechanical state of a fault zone. Faults that have been weakened by dynamic stresses can fail during seismic activity and trigger further earthquakes. In 2001, Gomberg wrote about the impact of the internet on communicating disaster and coordinating emergency response. It is well known that fast fault slips can trigger earthquakes, but Gomberg identified that slow, aseismic fault motion can also cause earthquakes. Gomberg studies the geological action beneath subduction zones, including submarine landslides. Her work has identified that earthquakes may start as foreshocks with aseismic slip.

Gomberg used state-of-the art characterisation methods to contribute to the first seismic hazard maps for Memphis, Tennessee, incorporating the effect of local geology, including soils.

Gomberg is a member of the faculty at the University of Washington, and a member of the Southern California Earthquake Center.

== Awards and honors ==
- 2013 American Geophysical Union Fellow
- 2015 Association for Women Geoscientists Excellence Award

Gomberg has won several United States Geological Survey Awards, including leadership awards (1998, 2000, 2001, 2004, 2007, 2008, 2016), liaison awards (1999) and participation awards (2016).
