= Women's IFWHA World Conference =

Field hockey competition for women

IFWHA World Conference
- Sport: field hockey
- Founded: 1930; 96 years ago
- Folded: 1979
- Replaced by: FIH Hockey World Cup
- Organizing body: IFWHA
- Continent: International

The IFWHA World Conference was the field hockey World Cup competition for women, whose format for qualification and the final tournament is similar to the men's. It has been held since 1930. The tournament has been organized by the Federation of Women's Hockey Associations (IFWHA).

== Results ==
=== Summaries ===
| Year | Host | Final | | | Third place match | | | Number of teams |
| Year | Host | Winner | Score | Runner-up | Third place | Score | Fourth place | Number of teams |
|---|---|---|---|---|---|---|---|---|
| 1930 | Geneva, Switzerland | | | | | | | |
| 1933 | Copenhagen, Denmark | England | Round-robin | United States | Scotland | Round-robin | Ireland | 8 |
| 1936 | Philadelphia, USA | England | Round-robin | United States | South Africa | Round-robin | Scotland | 8 |
| 1948 | Amsterdam, Netherlands | England | 1–0 | Netherlands | Scotland | 2–2 ^{[1]} | Ireland | 11 |
| 1950 | Johannesburg, South Africa | England | Round-robin | South Africa | United States | | | 6 |
| 1953 | Folkestone, England | Ireland | Round-robin | | England South Africa Australia^{[2]} | | | 16 |
| 1956 | Sydney, Australia | South Africa | Round-robin | England | New Zealand | Round-robin | Australia | 9 |
| 1959 | Amsterdam, Netherlands | England | Round-robin | Australia | South Africa | Round-robin | Netherlands | 15 |
| 1963 | Towson, Maryland, USA | New Zealand | Round-robin | Australia | South Africa | Round-robin | England | 16 |
| 1967 | Leverkusen, West Germany | England | Round-robin | Wales | South Africa | Round-robin | West Germany | 16 |
| 1971 | Auckland, New Zealand | Netherlands | Round-robin | West Germany | Australia | Round-robin | England | 16 |
| 1975 | Edinburgh, Scotland | England | 2–0 | Wales | New Zealand | 1–1 (3–2); Penalty strokes | Netherlands | 22 |
| 1979 | Vancouver, USA | Netherlands | 4–1 | West Germany | United States | 1–0 | Australia | 18 |

^[1] –Scotland declared winner for having more penalty corners.
^{[2]} – Ireland did not play against England, South Africa and Australia.

=== Gallery ===
World Conference 1948 started; The World Women's Hockey Championships are held in the Wagener Stadium in Amstelveen. SHOTS: - the participating teams are standing on the lawn while the national flags are hoisted; - game fragments, including the Netherlands (white blouses) - Spain (5-0), interspersed with shots of spectators; (languages: Dutch)

England win the World Conference 1948; In the Wagner stadium in Wagener Stadium, the deciding match will be played between the Netherlands and England (0-1). Final result: England win the tournament; The Netherlands comes in second; Scotland third. SHOTS: - teams enter the field; teams pose; - game fragments (Dutch ladies in light-colored skirts; English in dark ones); interspersed with shots of spectators; - national flags of England, the Netherlands and Scotland are hoisted; the relevant teams have been appointed;(languages: Dutch)

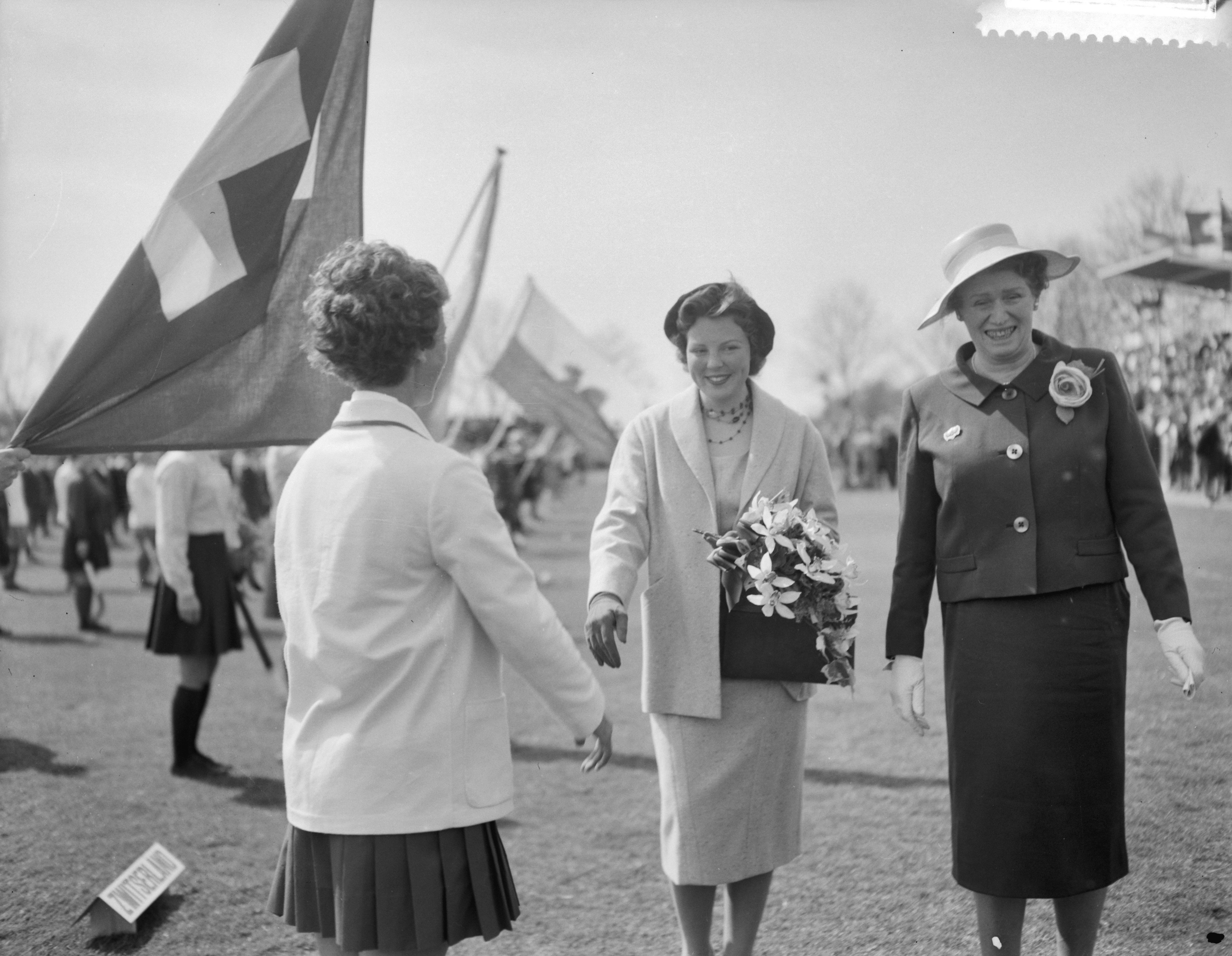
World Conference 1959 in the Wagener Stadium in Amstelveen in the presence of Her Royal Highness Princess Beatrix

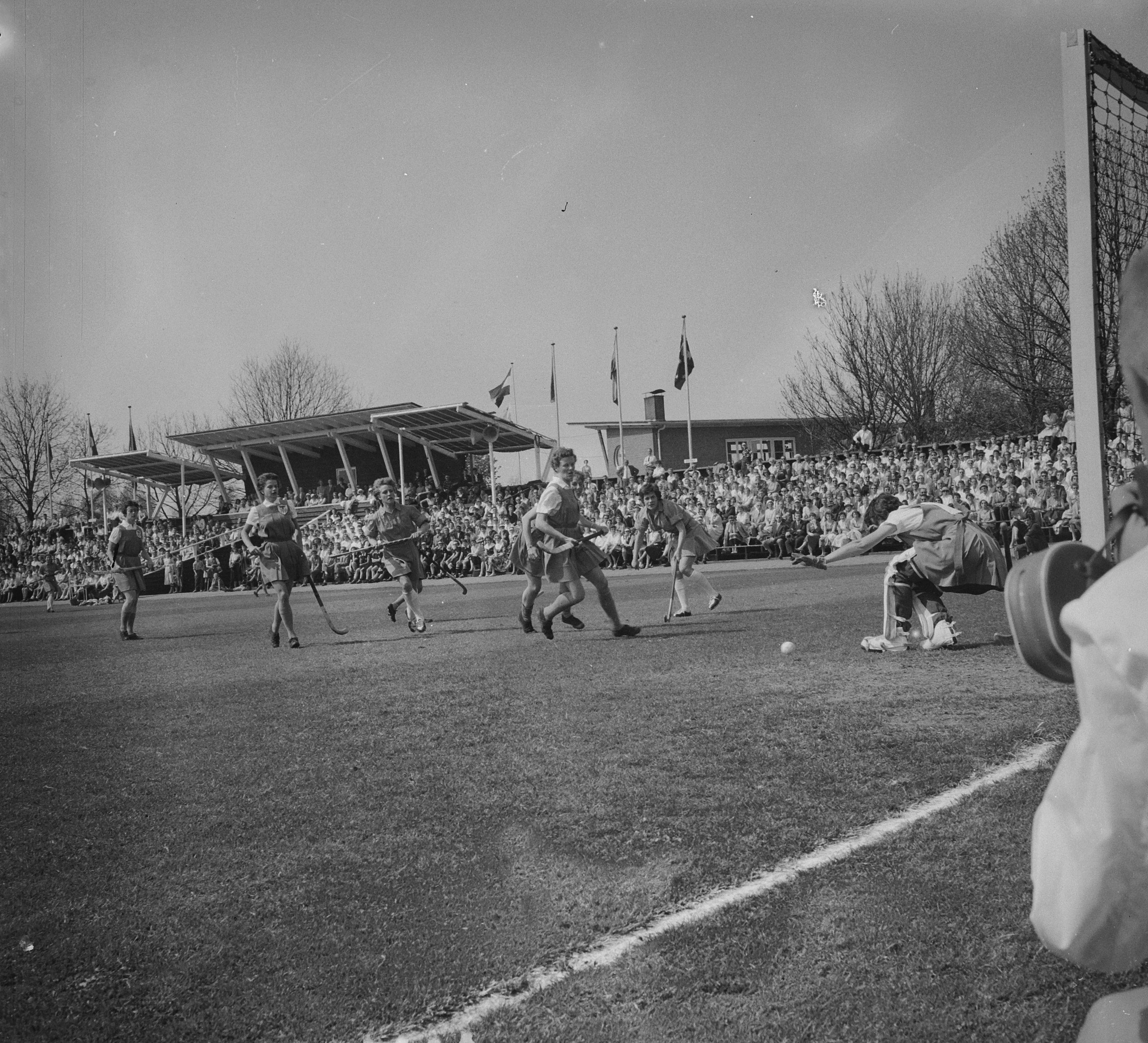
World Conference 1959 in the Wagener Stadium in Amstelveen, women's hockey Netherlands against USA, game moment with Trix Nillessen

=== Successful national teams ===
| Team | Titles | Runners-up | Third places |
|---|---|---|---|
| England | 7 (1933, 1936, 1948, 1950, 1956, 1959, 1967, 1975) | 1 (1953‡) | |
| Netherlands | 2 (1971, 1979) | 1 (1948*) | |
| South Africa | 1 (1956) | 2 (1950*, 1953‡) | 4 (1936, 1959, 1963, 1967) |
| New Zealand | 1 (1963) | | 2 (1956, 1975) |
| Ireland | 1 (1953) | | |
| Australia | | 3 (1953‡, 1959, 1963) | 1 (1971) |
| United States | | 2 (1933, 1936*) | 2 (1950, 1979*) |
| Wales | | 2 (1967, 1975) | |
| West Germany^ | | 2 (1971, 1979) | |
| Scotland | | | 2 (1933, 1948) |

* = host country
^ = includes results representing West Germany between 1974 and 1990
‡ = Ireland did not play against England, South Africa and Australia.

== Team appearances ==
| Team | (Denmark) 1933 | (United States) 1936 | (Netherlands) 1948 | (South Africa) 1950 | (England) 1953 | (Australia) 1956 | (Netherlands) 1959 | (United States) 1963 | (West Germany) 1967 | (New Zealand) 1971 | (Scotland) 1975 | (United States) 1979 | Total |
|---|---|---|---|---|---|---|---|---|---|---|---|---|---|
| Argentina | - | - | - | - | - | - | 12th | 14th | 14th | - | 6th | 10th | 5 |
| Australia | - | 5th | - | - | 2nd | 4th | 2nd | 2nd | 9th | 3rd | 5th | 4th | 9 |
| Austria | - | - | 10th | - | 16th | - | - | - | 15th | - | 19th | - | 4 |
| Belgium | - | - | 7th | - | 8th | - | 8th | - | 5th | 13th | 11th | - | 6 |
| Bermuda | - | - | - | - | - | - | - | - | - | - | 17th | - | 1 |
| Canada | - | - | - | - | - | 9th | 13th | 11th | 11th | 10th | 15th | 8th | 7 |
| Denmark | 7th | - | 8th | - | 14th | - | - | - | - | - | 22nd | - | 4 |
| England | 1st | 1st | 1st | 1st | 2nd | 2nd | 1st | 4th | 1st | 4th | 1st | 6th | 12 |
| Fiji | - | - | - | - | - | - | - | - | - | 16th | - | 14th | 2 |
| France | - | - | 6th | - | 10th | - | 14th | 15th | 12th | - | - | - | 2 |
| Hong Kong | - | - | - | - | - | - | - | - | - | - | - | 16th | 1 |
| India | - | - | - | - | 10th | 9th | - | - | - | 14th | 8th | 13th | 5 |
| Ireland | 4th | 6th | 4th | 5th | 1st | 5th | 9th | 12th | 7th | 12th | 7th | 11th | 12 |
| Great Britain and Ireland (U23) | - | - | - | - | - | - | - | - | - | - | 13th | - | 1 |
| Jamaica | - | - | - | - | - | - | - | 8th | 19th | - | 16th | - | 2 |
| Japan | - | - | - | - | - | - | - | - | - | 11th | 14th | 12th | 3 |
| Malaysia | - | - | - | - | - | - | - | - | - | 15th | 17th | - | 2 |
| Netherlands | 8th | - | 2nd | - | 5th | 5th | 4th | 5th | 10th | 1st | 4th | 1st | 10 |
| New Zealand | - | - | - | - | 6th | 3rd | 11th | 1st | 8th | 5th | 3rd | 9th | 8 |
| New Zealand (U23) | - | - | - | - | - | - | - | - | - | 7th | - | - | 1 |
| Scotland | 3rd | 3rd | 3rd | 4th | 7th | 8th | 10th | 13th | 6th | 6th | 9th | 7th | 12 |
| South Africa | - | 3rd | - | 2nd | 2nd | 1st | 3rd | 3rd | 3rd | - | - | - | 7 |
| Spain | - | - | 11th | - | - | - | - | - | 17th | - | 12th | - | 3 |
| Switzerland | - | - | - | - | 14th | - | 15th | 16th | 16th | - | - | - | 4 |
| Trinidad and Tobago | - | - | - | - | - | - | - | 10th | 13th | - | 18th | 15th | 4 |
| United States | 2nd | 2nd | 5th | 3rd | 10th | 5th | 6th | 7th | 17th | 8th | 10th | 3rd | 12 |
| Wales | 5th | 8th | 8th | - | 10th | - | 5th | 9th | 2nd | 9th | 2nd | 5th | 10 |
| West Germany^ | 6th | - | - | - | 10th | - | 7th | 6th | 4th | 2nd | - | 2nd | 7 |
| Zambia | - | - | - | - | - | - | - | - | - | - | 21st | 18th | 2 |
| Total | 8 | 8 | 11 | 6 | 16 | 9 | 15 | 16 | 16 | 16 | 22 | 18 | |

^ = includes results representing West Germany between 1974 and 1990

== See also ==
- Women's FIH Hockey World Cup
