= Ewing (surname) =

- Pronunciation: /ˈjuːɪŋ/ YOO-ing

Origin
- Language: Scottish English
- Origin: Old Gaelic
- Meaning: "(son of) Eógan"
- Region of origin: Scotland

Other names
- Variant forms: MacEwen and McEwing; Ewan and Ewans; Ewen and Ewens; Ewin and Ewins; Hewin and Hewins; Ewings
- See also: Welsh Owen

The surname Ewing is of Scottish origin, and is an Anglicised form derived from the Gaelic clan name Clann Eóghain meaning "Children of Eógan". The forename Eógan is thought to derive ultimately from the Greek eugenḗs (ευγενής), meaning 'noble' or literally 'well-born'.

The earliest known coat of arms in the name Ewing appears in the Workman Armorial dated 1566.

== Notable people with the surname ==
=== Born before 1800 ===
- Alexander Ewing (soldier) (1768–1827), soldier for the Continental Army during the American Revolutionary War and the War of 1812
- Finis Ewing (1773–1841)
- John Ewing (pastor) (1732–1801), American Presbyterian pastor and university president
- John Ewing (1789–1858), U.S. Representative from Indiana
- John Hoge Ewing (1796–1887), U.S. Representative from Pennsylvania
- Thomas Ewing (1789–1871), U.S. politician
- William Lee D. Ewing (1795–1846), U.S. politician

=== Born in the 19th century ===
- A.C. Ewing (1889–1973), British philosopher
- Alexander Ewing (bishop) (1814–1873), Scottish church leader
- Alexander Ewing (composer) (1830–1895), Scottish composer
- Alfred Ewing (1855–1935), British physicist and engineer
- Andrew Ewing (politician) (1813–1864), American politician
- Sir Archibald Orr-Ewing, 1st Baronet (1818–1893), Scottish politician
- Arthur Henry Ewing (1864–1912), American Presbyterian missionary and academic
- Bob Ewing (1873–1947), American baseball player
- Buck Ewing (1859–1906), American Major League Baseball player
- Charles Lindsay Orr-Ewing (1860–1903), Scottish politician
- Clinton L. Ewing (1879–1953), American farmer, businessman, and politician
- Cornelia Keeble Ewing (1898–1973), American clubwoman
- Dave Ewing (1881–1952), English footballer
- Edwin Hickman Ewing (1809–1902), American politician
- Emma Pike Ewing (1838–1917), American educator, author
- George Clinton Ewing (1810–1888), American politician and founder of Holyoke, Massachusetts
- George Edwin Ewing (1828–1884), Scottish sculptor
- Henry Ellsworth Ewing (1883–1951), American arachnologist
- J. C. Ewing (1875–1965), American college sports coach
- James Ewing (1866–1943), American pathologist
- John Ewing (1863–1895), American baseball player
- John D. Ewing (1892–1952), Louisiana journalist; editor, publisher of Shreveport Times, Monroe New-Star-World
- Juliana Horatia Ewing (1842–1885), English children's writer
- Matthew Ewing (1815–1874), American inventor
- Montague Ewing (1890–1957), British light music composer
- Norman Ewing (1870–1928), Australian politician
- Norman Orr-Ewing (1880–1960)
- Presley Ewing (1822-1854), U.S representative from Kentucky
- Robert Ewing (mayor) (1849–1932), mayor of Nashville, Tennessee, 1915–1917
- Sarah Ann Ewing (1826–1912), American socialite, slaveowner, and Confederate spy
- Thomas Ewing (1856–1920), Australian politician
- Thomas Ewing Jr. (1829–1896), American lawyer, general, and politician
- W. T. Ewing (1823–1891), American politician, physician, postmaster
- Z. W. Ewing (1843–1909), American politician from Tennessee

=== Born between 1900-1949 ===
- Diana Ewing (born 1946), American television actress
- Graviola Ewing (1930–2020), Guatemalan sprinter
- Harry Ewing, Baron Ewing of Kirkford (1931–2007), British politician
- Ian Orr-Ewing (1912–1999), British politician
- James Arthur Ewing (1916–1996), 40th Governor of American Samoa
- James Eugene Ewing (born 1933), American evangelist
- John H. Ewing (1918–2012), member of the New Jersey General Assembly and State Senate
- Margaret Ewing (1945–2006), Scottish politician, wife of Fergus Ewing
- Maurice Ewing (1906–1974), American geophysicist and oceanographer
- Roger Ewing (1942–2025), American film and television actor
- Rufus Ewing (born 1942), politician in the Turks and Caicos Islands
- Streamline Ewing, born John Ewing (1917–2002), American jazz trombonist
- Thomas W. Ewing (born 1935), American politician
- Winnie Ewing (1929–2023), Scottish politician

=== Born after 1950 ===
- Al Ewing (born 1977), British comic writer
- Annabelle Ewing (born 1960), Scottish politician, daughter of Winnie Ewing
- Brandon Ewing (born 1991), American internet personality
- Daniel Ewing (born 1983), American professional basketball player
- Dan Ewing (born 1985), Australian actor
- Fergus Ewing (born 1957), Scottish politician, son of Winnie Ewing
- Fyfe Ewing (born 1970), Irish drummer
- Garen Ewing (born 1969), British comic creator
- Gavin Ewing (born 1981), Zimbabwean cricketer
- Larry Ewing, American computer programmer
- Lynne Ewing, American author and a screenwriter
- Marc Ewing (born 1969), American developer of the Red Hat brand of software
- Maria Ewing (1950–2022), American opera singer
- Mason Ewing (born 1982), Cameroonian producer, director, scriptwriter and fashion designer
- Patrick Ewing (born 1962), Jamaica-born American basketball player and coach
- Patrick Ewing Jr. (born 1984), son of Patrick, American basketball player representing Jamaica internationally
- Reid Ewing (born 1988), American actor
- Skip Ewing (born 1964), American country music singer and songwriter
- Wenika Ewing (born 1985), Turks and Caicos fashion model
- A. J. Ewing (born 2004), American baseball player

== Fictional characters ==
=== Dallas and Knots Landing ===
The surname was used for the central Ewing family in the American primetime soap operas Dallas, as well as its 2012 revival and its spin-off Knots Landing. Listed below are characters who used that surname from all three series.

- Abby Ewing
- Amanda Lewis Ewing
- Ann Ewing
- April Stevens Ewing
- Betsy Ewing
- Bobby Ewing
- Bobby Ewing II
- Cally Harper Ewing
- Christopher Ewing
- (Miss) Ellie Ewing Farlow
- Gary Ewing
- Jack Ewing
- Jamie Ewing Barnes
- Jock Ewing
- John Ross Ewing III
- J.R. Ewing
- Lucy Ewing
- Pamela Barnes Ewing
- Pamela Rebecca Ewing
- Sue Ellen Ewing
- Valene Ewing

== See also ==
- Clan Ewing
- Ewing (given name)
- Ewing (disambiguation)
- Orr-Ewing Baronets
- Adlai Ewing Stevenson I
- Adlai Ewing Stevenson II
- Adlai Ewing Stevenson III
- William Euing, whose surname was occasionally spelled Ewing
