= Richard Wiese (linguist) =

German linguist

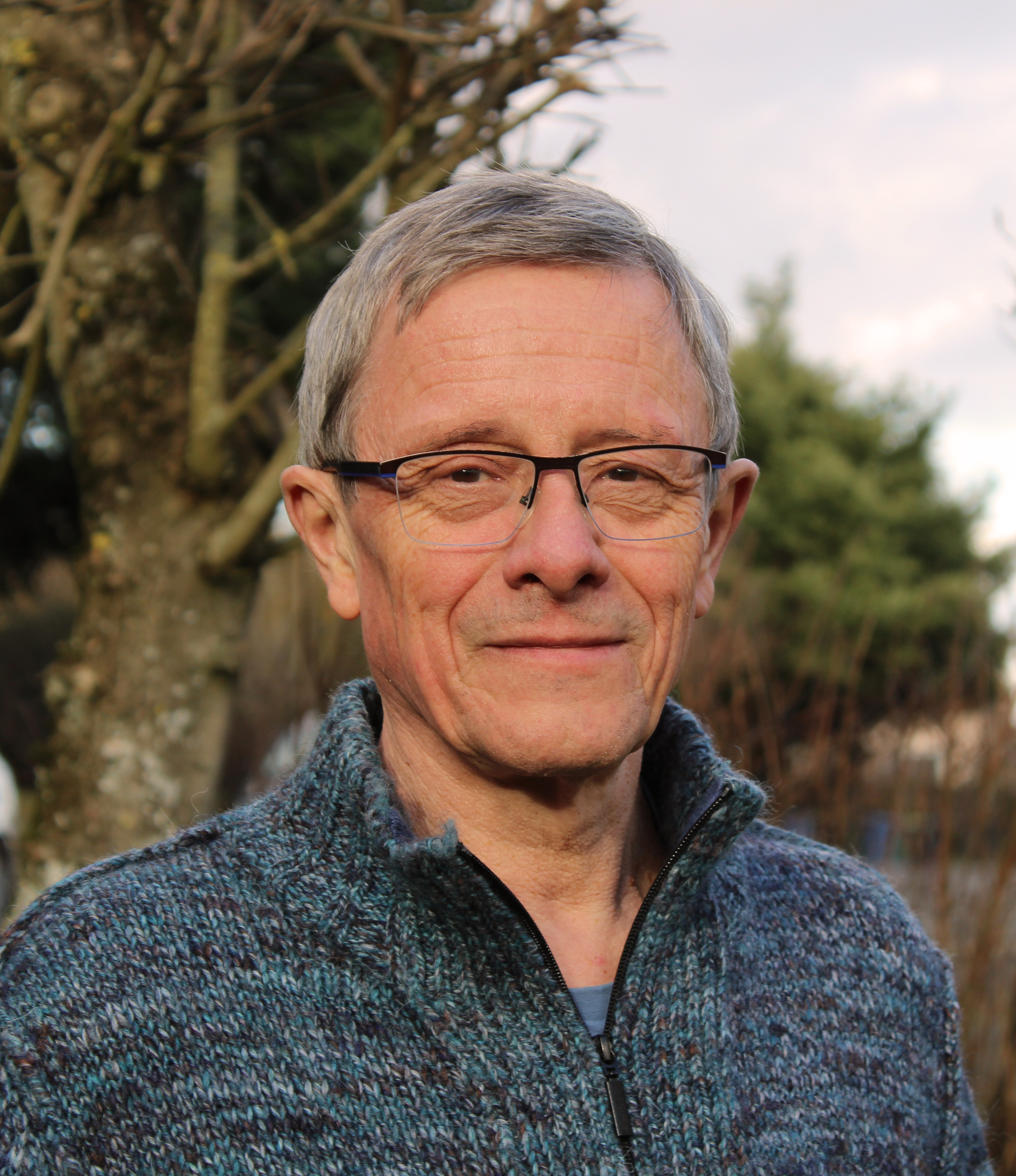
- Richard Wiese in 2022
- Born: 1953 (age 72–73); Meppen, West Germany
- Occupation: Professor of Linguistics
- Title: Prof. Dr.

Academic background
- Education: Universität Bielefeld; HHU Düsseldorf
- Thesis: Psycholinguistische Aspekte der Sprachproduktion: Sprechverhalten und Verbalisierungsprozesse (1983)

Academic work
- Discipline: Linguistics
- Sub-discipline: Phonology; morphology; psycholinguistics; neurolinguistics
- Institutions: Heinrich-Heine-Universität Düsseldorf; Philipps-Universität Marburg
- Website: www.uni-marburg.de/de/fb09/igs/arbeitsgruppen/sprachtheorie-und-psycholinguistik-2

Richard Wiese (German: [ˈʁɪçaʁt ˈviːzə]) is a German linguist, with academic degrees from the universities of Bielefeld and Düsseldorf. Since 1996, he is a professor of German Linguistics at Philipps-Universität Marburg, Germany, now retired. He has also worked at the universities of Bielefeld, Kassel, TU Berlin, and Düsseldorf.

He has done research primarily on the phonology and morphology of German, but also of other languages such as Chinese, and is best known for his book The Phonology of German (Oxford University Press 1996/^{2}2000), the standard work describing the sound system of the language. Other scientific studies address the word structure of German and English, orthographic structure, and the relation between phonology and orthography. The processing of language has been studied in numerous psycholinguistic and neurolinguistic experiments on word stress and phonotactic and rhythmic structure, with a focus on German, English, Polish, Russian, Egyptian Arabic, and Turkish. This research received funding and several grants from the German Research Foundation (DFG).

Besides his work in research and teaching, Wiese has served in various other academic functions, such as dean of the department, elected member of the linguistics board of the German Research Foundation, and president of the German Linguistics Society (DGfS) from 2006 to 2009.

== Publications ==
=== Monographs ===
- Richard Wiese 1983. Psycholinguistische Aspekte der Sprachproduktion: Sprechverhalten und Verbalisierungsprozesse. Buske Verlag, Hamburg. ISBN 3-87118-625-2.
- Richard Wiese 1988. Silbische und Lexikalische Phonologie. Studien zum Chinesischen und Deutschen. Niemeyer Verlag, Tübingen. ISBN 3-484-30211-9.
- Richard Wiese 1996. The Phonology of German. Oxford University Press, Oxford. 2nd edition, 2000. ISBN 0-19-824040-6.
- Richard Wiese 2011. Phonetik und Phonologie. UTB/Wilhelm Fink, Paderborn. ISBN 978-3-8252-3354-9. Open access version.

=== Edited works ===
- Wolfgang Kehrein, Richard Wiese (eds.) 1998. Phonology and Morphology of the Germanic Languages. Tübingen: Niemeyer. ISBN 978-3-484-30386-7.
- Richard Wiese (co-editor) 2006. Encyclopedia of Language and Linguistics (14 volumes). Oxford: Elsevier.
- Christiane Ulbrich, Alexander Werth, Richard Wiese (eds.) 2018. Empirical Approaches to the Phonological Structure of Words. Berlin: de Gruyter. ISBN 978-3-11-054058-1.
- Mathias Scharinger, Richard Wiese (eds.) 2022. How Language Speaks to Music: Prosody from a Cross-domain Perspective. Berlin: de Gruyter. ISBN 978-3-11-077010-0.

=== Selected articles ===
- Richard Wiese 1986. Schwa and the structure of words in German. Linguistics 24, 697–724.
- Gary Marcus, Ursula Brinkmann, Harald Clahsen, Richard Wiese, Steven Pinker 1995. German inflection: The exception that proves the rule. Cognitive Psychology 29, 189–256.
- Richard Wiese: Phrasal compounds and the theory of word syntax. Linguistic Inquiry 27/1, 1996, 183–193.
- Richard Wiese 1996. Phonological vs. morphological rules: on German umlaut and ablaut. Journal of Linguistics 32/1, 113–135.
- Richard Wiese 1997. Underspecification and the description of Chinese vowels. In: Wang Jialing & Norval Smith (eds.): Studies in Chinese Phonology. Berlin: Mouton de Gruyter, 219–249.
- Richard Wiese 1999. On default rules and other rules. Behavioral and Brain Sciences 22/6, 1043–44.
- Richard Wiese 2001. The phonology of /r/. In: Tracy Alan Hall (ed.) Distinctive Feature Theory. Berlin: de Gruyter, 335–368.
- Richard Wiese 2001. Regular morphology vs. prosodic morphology? - The case of truncations in German. Journal of Germanic Linguistics 13/2, 131–177.
- Richard Wiese 2003. The unity and variation of (German) /r/. Zeitschrift für Dialektologie und Linguistik 70, 25–43.
- Richard Wiese 2008. A two-level approach to morphological structure. Journal of Germanic Linguistics 20, 243–274.
- Richard Wiese 2011. The representation of rhotics. In: The Blackwell Companion to Phonology, vol. 1. Ed. by Marc van Oostendorp, Colin Ewen, Elizabeth Hume, and Keren Rice. John Wiley & Sons, 711–729.
- Paula Orzechowska, Richard Wiese 2015. Preferences and variation in word-initial phonotactics: A multi-dimensional evaluation of German and Polish. Folia Linguistica 49/2, 439–486.
- Richard Wiese, Augustin Speyer 2015. Prosodic parallelism explaining morphophonological variation in German. Linguistics 53/3, 525–559.
- Katerina D. Kandylaki, Arne Nagels, Sarah Tune, Tilo Kircher, Richard Wiese, Matthias Schlesewsky, Ina Bornkessel-Schlesewsky 2016. Predicting „When“ in discourse engages the human dorsal stream: an fMRI study using naturalistic stories. Journal of Neuroscience 36, 12180–12191.
- Richard Wiese 2016. Prosodic Parallelism – comparing spoken and written language. Frontiers in Psychology – Language Sciences 7.
- Richard Wiese, Paula Orzechowska, Phillip Alday, Christiane Ulbrich 2017. Structural principles or frequency of use? An ERP experiment on the learnability of consonant clusters. Frontiers in Psychology – Auditory Cognitive Neuroscience 7.
- Katerina D. Kandylaki, Karen Henrich, Arne Nagels, Tilo Kircher, Ulrike Domahs, Matthias Schlesewsky, Ina Bornkessel-Schlesewsky, Richard Wiese 2017. Where is the beat? The neural correlates of lexical stress and rhythmical well-formedness in auditory story comprehension. Journal of Cognitive Neuroscience 29, 1119–1131.
- Richard Wiese 2022. Rhythmic structure – parallels between language and music. In: How language speaks to music: prosody from a cross-domain perspective. Ed. by Mathias Scharinger, Richard Wiese. Berlin: de Gruyter, 135–159.
- Richard Wiese, Paula Orzechowska 2023. Structure and usage do not explain each other: an analysis of German word-initial clusters. Linguistics 61/5, 1259–1284.
- Gunnar Ólafur Hansson, Richard Wiese 2024. Umlaut in the Germanic languages. In: Nancy A. Ritter & Harry van der Hulst (eds.) The Oxford Handbook of Vowel Harmony. Oxford: Oxford University Press, 864–871.
- Paula Orzechowska, Richard Wiese 2024. Allophonic variation and its consequences: A lexical decision study on <qu> words in German. Lingua 307, 1–18.
- Heba El Shanawany, Richard Wiese 2026. Transfer or universal principles? – Final Devoicing in second language German by speakers of Arabic. Linguistische Berichte 286, 163–177.
