= Jeroen van de Weijer =

Dutch linguist (born 1965)

- Born: August 29, 1965 (age 61); Nijmegen, The Netherlands
- Education: Radboud University Nijmegen, Leiden University
- Awards: Oriental Scholar - Magnolia Award (Silver), awarded by the City of Shanghai
- Scientific career
- Fields: Linguistics, Phonology
- Workplaces: Shenzhen University
- Doctoral advisor: Colin J. Ewen, Harry van der Hulst

Jeroen van de Weijer (born August 29, 1965 in Nijmegen) is a Dutch linguist who teaches phonology, morphology, phonetics, psycholinguistics, historical linguistics and other courses at Shenzhen University, where he is Distinguished Professor of English linguistics at the School of Foreign Languages. Before, he was Full Professor of English Linguistics at Shanghai International Studies University, in the School of English Studies.

== Career ==
After his first degree in English at Radboud University Nijmegen, he worked at the Max Planck Institute for Psycholinguistics in Nijmegen and obtained his PhD in linguistics at Leiden University. He taught for brief periods at Radboud University Nijmegen, University College London and for over ten years at Leiden University. He is a Fellow of the Royal Netherlands Institute for Advanced Study. Van de Weijer specializes in phonological theory, the phonology-morphology interface, varieties of English, and East Asian languages. He helped edit the journal of Latin and Romance linguistics Probus (Mouton de Gruyter, Editor-in-chief: Leo Wetzels) from 1986 until 2009, and published many edited collections, on a number of topics such as Optimality Theory, Japanese and Dutch. His current research is focused on combining models of theoretical phonology with psycholinguistics.

== Selected publications ==
- "Gender identification in Chinese names". 2020. Lingua 234, 102759. Co-authors: Ren Guangyuan, Joost van de Weijer, Wei Weiyun & Wang Yumeng.
- "Where now with Optimality Theory?" 2019. Acta Linguistica Academica 66.1, 115-135.
- "Dependency Phonology". 2018. In S. J. Hannahs & Anna R. K. Bosch (eds.), The Routledge Handbook of Phonological Theory, 325-359. Routledge, London. Co-author: Harry van der Hulst. ISBN 978-1-13-802581-3
- "What can adult speech tell us about child language acquisition?". 2015. Canadian Journal of Linguistics 60.1, 75-83. Co-author: Marjoleine Sloos.
- "The Origin of OT Constraints". 2014. Lingua 142, 66-75.
- Grammar as Selection. Combining Optimality Theory and Exemplar Theory. 2012. Kougaku, Nagoya. ISBN 978-4-903742-20-5.
- "Secondary and double articulation". 2011. In Marc van Oostendorp, Colin J. Ewen, Elizabeth V. Hume and Keren Rice (eds.) The Blackwell Companion to Phonology, 694-710. Wiley Blackwell, London. ISBN 978-1-4051-8423-6
- "Morphological Variation in Japanese". 2010. Co-editor: Tetsuo Nishihara. Lingua 120, 2319-2423.
- "Optimality Theory and Exemplar Theory". 2009. Phonological Studies 12, 117-124. Kaitakusha, Tokyo. ISBN 978-4-7589-0532-9.
- "An X-bar approach to the syllable structure of Mandarin". 2008. Lingua 118, 1416-1428. Co-author: Jason Zhang.
- Voicing in Dutch. 2007. Current Issues in Linguistic Theory 286. John Benjamins, Amsterdam and Philadelphia. Co-editor: Erik-Jan van der Torre. ISBN 978-90-272-4801-5.
- Linguistics in the Netherlands 2006. John Benjamins, Amsterdam and Philadelphia. Co-editor: Bettelou Los. ISBN 978-90-272-3166-6.
- Voicing in Japanese. 2005. Studies in Generative Grammar 84. Mouton de Gruyter, Berlin. Co-editors: Kensuke Nanjo and Tetsuo Nishihara. ISBN 978-3-11-018600-0.
- The Internal Organization of Phonological Segments. 2005. Studies in Generative Grammar 77. Mouton de Gruyter, Berlin. Co-editor: Marc van Oostendorp. ISBN 978-3-11-018295-8.
- Linguistics in the Netherlands 2005. John Benjamins, Amsterdam and Philadelphia. Co-editor: Jenny Doetjes. ISBN 978-90-272-3165-9.
- Usage-Based Approaches to Dutch - Lexicon, Grammar, Discourse. 2003. LOT Occasional Publications 1. Netherlands Graduate School of Linguistics, Utrecht. Co-editor: Arie Verhagen. ISBN 90-76864-47-0.
- "Patterns of Segmental Modification in Consonant Inventories: A Cross-Linguistic Study". 2003. Linguistics 41, 1041-1084. Co-author: Frans Hinskens.
- The Phonological Spectrum. Volumes I and II. Current Issues in Linguistic Theory 233 and 234. 2003. John Benjamins, Amsterdam and Philadelphia. Co-editors: Harry van der Hulst and Vincent J. van Heuven. ISBN 978-90-272-4746-9 (set).
- "An Optimality Theoretical Analysis of the Dutch Diminutive". 2002. In Hans Broekhuis and Paula Fikkert (eds.) Linguistics in the Netherlands 2002, 199-209. John Benjamins, Amsterdam and Philadelphia.
- Issues in Japanese Phonology and Morphology. 2001. Studies in Generative Grammar 51. Mouton de Gruyter, Berlin. Co-editor: Tetsuo Nishihara. ISBN 978-3-11-016958-4.
- Optimality Theory: Phonology, Syntax and Acquisition. 2000. Oxford University Press, Oxford. Co-editors: Joost Dekkers and Frank van der Leeuw. ISBN 978-0-19-823844-7.
- "Analogical Change in Optimality Theory". 1999. Phonological Studies 2, 145-52. Kaitakusha, Tokyo. ISBN 978-4-7589-0532-9.
- Segmental Structure and Complex Segments 1996. Niemeyer, Tübingen. ISBN 978-3-484-30350-8.
- "Vowel Harmony". 1995. In John Goldsmith (ed.) The Handbook of Phonological Theory, 495-534. Basil Blackwell, Oxford. Co-author: Harry van der Hulst. ISBN 978-0-631-20126-7.
