= Ewin =

Ewin is both a surname and a given name. Notable people with the name include:

== Surname ==
- David Floyd Ewin (1911–2003), English administrator of St Paul’s Cathedral
- Donna Ewin (born 1970), English former glamour model and actress
- Paula Ewin (born 1965), Australian wheelchair basketball player
- Stuart Ewin, OAM (born 1967), Australian wheelchair basketball player
- Wayne Ewin (born 1953), former Australian rules footballer
- William Ewin (1808–1886), American artisan, lawyer, civil servant and State Senator
- William Howell Ewin (1731?–1804), English usurer

== Given name ==
- Ewin L. Davis (1876–1949), American politician, member of the United States House of Representatives
- Ewin Ryckaert, film editor with more than seventy film credits
- Ewin Tang, computer scientist

== See also ==
- Glen Ewin jams and preserves, founded by George McEwin (1815–1885), gardener and orchardist in the early days of South Australia
- Erin (disambiguation)
- Ewing (disambiguation)
- Erwin (disambiguation)
- Ewan (disambiguation)
- Ewen (disambiguation)
- Edwin (disambiguation)
- Evin (disambiguation)
