= Ewen (surname) =

Ewen is a surname, and may refer to:

- Aaron Ewen (born 1996), New Zealand alpine skier
- Colin J. Ewen, British linguist
- David Ewen (1884–1957), New Zealand businessman, soldier and politician
- David Ewen (writer) (1907–1985), American writer on music
- Dickie Ewen (born 1937), Scottish footballer
- Donald Ewen (1922–2005), Canadian politician
- Elizabeth Ewen (died 2012), American scholar of women's history, immigration and film
- Ettore Ewen, better known as Big E (Langston), American professional wrestler
- Frederic Ewen (1899–1988), American professor of English
- Günter Hermann Ewen (1962–1999), German spree shooter
- Harold Irving Ewen (1922–2015), American radio astronomer
- Herbert L'Estrange Ewen (1876–1912), British stamp dealer and philatelist
- Ian Ewen-Street (born 1949), New Zealand politician
- Jade Ewen, British singer
- Jean Ewen (1911–1987), Canadian nurse
- Joe Medew-Ewen, Australian cricketer
- John Ewen (1741–1821), Scottish songwriter
- Maggie Ewen (born 1994), American shot putter
- Mathias Ewen (born 1941), Luxembourgish footballer
- Mortimer Ewen (1816–1887), English cricketer
- Paterson Ewen, Canadian painter
- Patrik Ewen, Breton story-teller and musician
- Richard Ewen, English priest in the 15th century
- Stuart Ewen, American historian
- Todd Ewen, Canadian ice hockey player
- William Ewen, Governor of Georgia, United States

== See also ==
- Ewan (surname)
- Ewin
