= Eógan =

Éogan is an early Irish male given name, which also has the hypocoristic and diminutive forms Eoganán, Eóghainin, Eóghain and Eóghainn. The Modern Irish form of the name is Eoghan (pronounced [ˈoː(ə)nˠ]).

In Scottish Gaelic, the name is Eòghann or Eòghan. All of the above are often anglicised as Euan, Ewan, Ewen or, less often, Owen. The name in both Goidelic languages is generally considered a derivative of the Greek and Latin name Eugenes, meaning "noble born".

== Etymology ==
The Corpus Inscriptionum Insularum Celticarum derives Eógan from the Primitive Irish *Iwagenas, while others such as Tomás Ua Concheanainn (Mion-chomhradh, in 1903) have stated that Eóghan equates to Owain and Eugene; Rachel Bromwich has commented that Eoghan is a derivation of the Latin Eugenius, making these names long-attested in Gaelic areas, yet still based on loan-words. Morgan notes that there are less likely alternative explanations and agrees with Rachel Bromwich that Welsh Owein “is normally latinized as Eugenius," and "both the Welsh and Irish forms are Latin derivatives".

Eoghan has also been translated into English as "well born", in an example c. 1923, due to this Latin derivation, with the note that in common usage it is usually anglicised to "Eugene". The name corresponds to the Welsh Owain, often spelt Owen in English; as well to Ewen, Ewan and Euan. The most likely and widely accepted origin of the Old Welsh Owain is, like the Old Irish Eogan also from Latin Eugenius.

== List of people ==
=== Celtic nobility ===
- Éogan mac Durthacht, king of Fernmag in the Ulster Cycle of Irish mythology
- Eógan mac Muiredaig, king of Dál Riata
- Eógan mac Néill, son of Niall of the Nine Hostages, eponymous founder of the Cenél nEógain and Inis Eógain
- Éogan Mór, eponymous ancestor of the Eóganachta
- Éogan of Ardstraw (6th century), Irish saint
- Eóganan mac Óengusa (died 839), king of Fortriu
- Éogan of Argyll (Eóghan MacDubhgaill) (died in or after 1268)
- Eoghain Ó Cianáin, harper and a servant of the 9th Earl of Kildare
- Mug Nuadat, sometimes known as Éogan
- Owain ap Dyfnwal (fl. 934), King of the Cumbrians
- Owain ap Dyfnwal (died 1015), King of the Cumbrians
- Owain Foel (fl. 1018), King of the Cumbrians

=== Recent times ===
- Eoghan Corry, Irish journalist and historian
- Eoghan Fitzsimons, former Attorney General of Ireland
- Eoghan Harris, Irish politician
- Eoghan Hickey, rugby player
- Eoghan Kenny, Irish politician
- Eoghan McDermott (MacDiarmada), TV broadcaster
- Eoghan McGettigan, Gaelic footballer
- Eoghan Quigg, Singer

== See also ==
- Eòghann and Eòghan at List of Scottish Gaelic given names
- Egan, Eoin, Euan, Evan, Ewan, Ewen, Ewin, Ewing
- Tír Eoghain
  - List of rulers of Tír Eoghain
- Cenél nEógain
- McEwan (MacEòghainn)
- MacEwen, Clan MacEwen
- McCown (Mac Eòghain)
- Clan MacCowan
- Clan Ewing
- Clan Ewen of Otter
- Eóganachta
- Irish name
