= Ewing =

Ewing may refer to:

== People ==
- Ewing (surname)
- Ewing (given name)

== Places ==
United States

- Ewing Township, Boone County, Arkansas
- Ewing, Illinois, a village
- Ewing Township, Franklin County, Illinois
- Ewing, Indiana, an unincorporated community
- Ewing, Kentucky, a city
- Ewing Township, Michigan
- Ewing, Missouri, a city
- Ewing, Nebraska, a village
- Ewing Township, Holt County, Nebraska
- Ewing Township, New Jersey
  Ewing (unincorporated community), New Jersey, an unincorporated community within the township
- Ewing/Carroll, Trenton, New Jersey, a neighborhood in the city of Trenton
- Ewing, Ohio, an unincorporated community
- Ewing, Angelina County, Texas. a ghost town
- Ewing, Virginia, a census-designated place
- Ewing Yard, a rail yard on the St Louis MetroLink

Elsewhere

- Ewing Island (Antarctica)
- Ewing Island (New Zealand)
- Ewing Seamount, in the south Atlantic Ocean

== Other uses ==
- Ewing Public Schools, a school district serving Ewing Township, Mercer County, New Jersey
- Ewing High School (disambiguation), multiple schools
- USRC Ewing, a United States Revenue Cutter Service vessel built in 1841

== See also ==
- E-wing, a fictional Star Wars spacecraft
- Alexander Ewing House, historic house in Tennessee, USA
- Ewing's sarcoma, a type of bone cancer
- Ewing Theory
- Ewing v. California, a U.S. Supreme Court case upholding the use of three strikes laws
- Ewing v. Goldstein, a landmark court case that helped to define the ethical duties of mental health professionals with respect to potentially violent individuals
