= Euan =

- Pronunciation: /ˈjuːən/
- Gender: Male

Origin
- Origin: Scottish, Pictish
- Meaning: Born of the Yew Tree, Born of the Mountain, Youth
- Region of origin: Scotland

Other names
- Cognate: John
- Derivative: Eòghann
- Related names: Ewan, Eòghann, John, Evan, Ewen, Eoghan, Eoin, Iwan, Owen, Eugene

Euan is a Scottish, male given name, most common throughout the United Kingdom, Canada and Australia, due to the influence of Scots in both nations. It is usually an anglicisation of the Scottish Gaelic names Eòin as a cognate for John (see Eoin) or Eòghann, "noble born" and therefore derived ultimately from Latin Eugenius (Eugene). It is also a derivative of the Pictish name, Uuen (or 'Wen'), which is the Pictish British cognate of Eòghann in Gaelic.

It is also the source of surnames, mostly connected to Clan MacEwen and including MacEwan and MacEwen.

The English equivalent of the name is John.

Owain is the predominant Welsh spelling of the name (or Owen when Anglicized), but Iwan and Iuan are also found, as they are in Cornish. Ouen can be considered the French or Breton spelling of the name.

Euan is also a Latin word meaning Bacchus.

== People with the given name ==
=== In the arts and media ===
- Euan Heng (born 1945), Scottish-Australian painter
- Euan Kerr, editor of The Beano
- Euan Lloyd (1923–2016), British film producer
- Euan Macleod (born 1956), New Zealand painter
- Euan Morton (born 1977), Scottish singer and actor
- Euan Uglow (1932–2000), English painter
- Euan Guthrie (born 1996), Scottish filmmaker

=== In sports ===
- Euan Aitken (born 1995), Australian rugby league footballer
- Euan Burton (born 1979), British judoka
- Euan Byers (born 1974), Scottish curler
- Euan Dale (born 1985), Scottish swimmer
- Euan Henderson (snooker player) (born 1967), Scottish snooker player
- Euan McLean (born 1986), Scottish footballer
- Euan Norris (born 1977), Scottish football referee
- Euan McCabe (born 2005), English diver
- Euan Murray (born 1980), Scottish rugby union footballer

=== In politics ===
- Euan Geddes, 3rd Baron Geddes (born 1937), peer and politician
- Euan Howard, 4th Baron Strathcona and Mount Royal (1923–2018), British politician
- Euan Robson (born 1954), Scottish Liberal Democrats politician
- Euan Stainbank (born 2000), Scottish Labour politician
- Euan Wallace (1892–1941), British Conservative politician

=== In other fields ===
- Euan Mason (born 1953), New Zealand forestry academic
- Euan Sutherland (born 1969), Scottish businessman

== Characters ==
- Euan Pierce, the lead character from the TV series Off Centre

== See also ==
- Eógan
- Eógan (given name)
- Iwan (name)
- Evan
- Ewan
- MacEwen
