= Edwin (disambiguation) =

Edwin is a given name.

Edwin may also refer to:

== Arts and entertainment ==
- Edwin (film), a 1984 British television film starring Alec Guinness
- Edwin (play), a 1724 tragedy by George Jeffreys

== People and fictional and mythical characters ==
- Edwin (surname), a list of people and fictional and mythical characters
- Edwin (director) (born 1978), Indonesian filmmaker
- Edwin (musician), Canadian musician Edwin Ghazal (born 1968)

== Other uses ==
- Edwin, Alabama, United States, an unincorporated community
- 1046 Edwin, an asteroid
- Edwin (company), a Japanese garment brand
- The Edwin, a building, formerly a hotel, in Toronto, Ontario, Canada
- Edwin (ship), a 15-ton schooner wrecked near Cape Hawke, New South Wales, Australia, in late June 1816
- Edwin, an Emacs-like editor built into MIT/GNU Scheme

== See also ==
- Edwin or Eadwine Psalter, a 12th century psalter
