= Charles Edwin =

Charles Edwin may refer to:

- Charles Edwin (died 1756), Welsh politician, MP for Westminster 1741–47, for Glamorgan 1747–56
- Charles Edwin (died 1801), Welsh politician, MP for Glamorgan 1780–89

== See also ==
- Edwin (surname)
