= Ellen Kaisse =

American linguist

Ellen M. Kaisse

Academic background
- Education: Harvard University
- Thesis: Hiatus in Modern Greek (1977)

Academic work
- Discipline: Linguistics
- Sub-discipline: Phonology
- Institutions: University of Washington

Ellen M. Kaisse (born 1949) is an American linguist. She is professor emerita of linguistics at the University of Washington, best known for her research on the interface between phonology, syntax, and morphology.

== Career ==
Kaisse earned her PhD in linguistics in 1977 from Harvard University, with a dissertation entitled Hiatus in Modern Greek. In 1976 she took up a position at the University of Washington, where she stayed for 40 years, until her retirement.

Over the course of her career, she worked on a wide range of issues in theoretical phonology and particularly on the phonology of Modern Greek, (Argentinian) Spanish and Turkish. She has published on topics ranging from lexical phonology to the phonology-syntax interface to vowel harmony to featural phonology.

== Honors and distinctions ==
Kaisse served as president of the Linguistic Society of America from January 6, 2013 – January 5, 2014. She was inducted as a Fellow of the Linguistic Society of America in 2015.

Kaisse has co-edited the journal Phonology (Cambridge University Press) with Colin Ewen (Leiden University) since 1988.

== Selected publications ==
- Kaisse, Ellen M. (1985). Connected Speech: The Interaction of Syntax and Phonology. Academic Press.
- Kaisse, Ellen M.; Zwicky, Arnold, eds. (1987). Phonology Yearbook 4: Syntactic Conditions on Phonological Rules.
- Kaisse, Ellen M. (1990). "Toward a typology of postlexical rules". In Inkelas, S.; Zec, D. (eds.). The Syntax-Phonology Connection. CSLI Publications. pp. 123–138.
- Kaisse, Ellen M. (1992). "Can [consonantal] spread?". Language. 68 (2): 313–332. doi:10.2307/416943. JSTOR 416943.
- Kaisse, Ellen M. (1993). "Rule generalization and rule reordering in Lexical Phonology: a reconsideration". In Hargus, S.; Kaisse, E. (eds.). Studies in Lexical Phonology. Academic Press. pp. 343–363.
- Kaisse, Ellen M.; McMahon, April (2011). "Lexical phonology and the lexical syndrome". In van Oostendorp, M.; et al. (eds.). The Wiley-Blackwell Companion to Phonology.
- Kaisse, Ellen M. (2011). "The stricture features". In van Oostendorp, M.; et al. (eds.). The Wiley-Blackwell Companion to Phonology.

== See also ==
- Emily M. Bender
- Michael Brame
