= Sarah Ewing Sims Carter Gaut =

Confederate spy and socialite

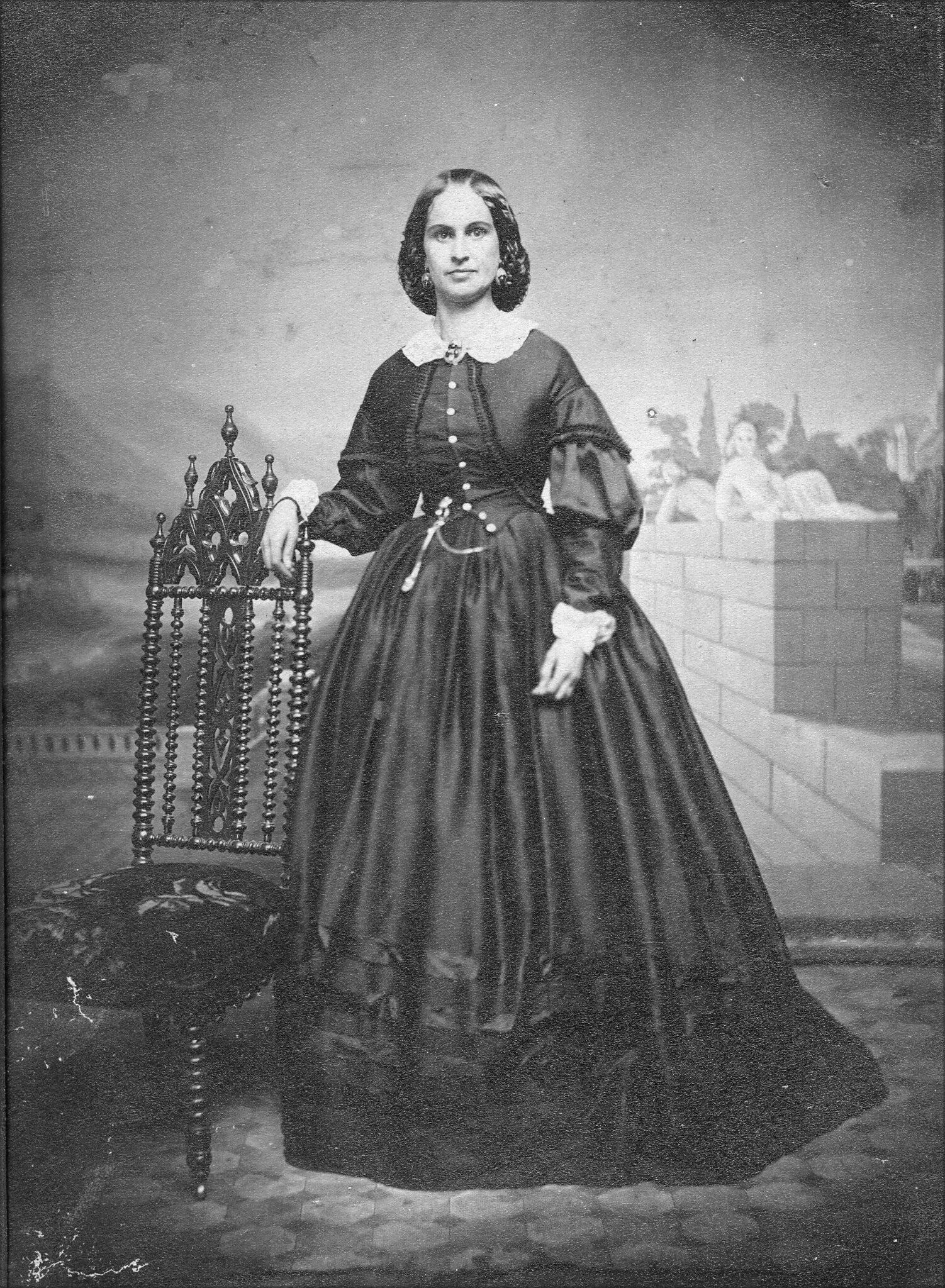
- Born: Sarah Ann Ewing; July 12, 1826; Ewingville, Tennessee, U.S.
- Died: August 21, 1912 (aged 86); Franklin, Tennessee, U.S.
- Resting place: Mount Hope Cemetery (Tennessee)
- Other name: Sallie Ewing Sims Carter Gaut
- Occupations: socialite, spy
- Spouse(s): Boyd McNairy Sims; Joseph W. Carter; John M. Gaut
- Children: 5
- Parent(s): Alexander C. Ewing; Chloe Saunders
- Relatives: Adelicia Acklen (cousin); Alexander Ewing (grandfather)

Sarah Ann Ewing Sims Carter Gaut (July 12, 1826 – August 21, 1912), usually known as Sarah Ewing Carter, was an American socialite, secessionist, and Confederate spy. She is purported to have hung the first Confederate flag in Franklin, Tennessee and became famous during the American Civil War for assisting her cousin, Adelicia Acklen, in smuggling cotton out of the country to sell in Europe. She entertained both Confederate and Union Army officers and soldiers in her home, gathering information to provide to Confederate troops. Gaut was the founder of the Franklin and South Pittsburg chapters of the United Daughters of the Confederacy.

== Early life ==
Gaut was born Sarah Ann Ewing on July 12, 1826, to Alexander C. Ewing, a descendant of Clan Ewing, and Chloe Saunders Ewing. She was known as "Sallie" by her family. The family home, on the Murfreesboro Pike in Nashville, had been given to her grandfather, Colonel Alexander Ewing, in 1787 for his services during the American Revolution. After her parents died, she was raised by a relative, Sallie McGavock.

== Adult life ==
In 1842, when she was fifteen years old, Gaut married her first husband, Boyd McNairy Sims, who was a wealthy lawyer. She and Sims had three children. Her husband died at the age of twenty-seven and was buried in Hightower Cemetery near Brentwood.

She married a second time, to Joseph W. Carter, a member of the Tennessee State Legislature from Winchester, with whom she had two children.

In 1860, she moved from her father's estate to a house on Third Avenue North in Franklin. At her home, she enslaved multiple people who had been left to her in her father's will, including Millie Simpkins and Andrew Ewing, the latter of whom would later serve as a 1st Sergeant of the 12th United States Colored Infantry Regiment. Simpkins later stated in an interview that her "misses was very rich" and had "two slave women to dress her every morning". Simpkins also said that she would serve Gaut every morning with breakfast on a silver waiter.

=== Civil War ===
Gaut, then Mrs. Carter, supported the Confederate Cause to secede from the Union during the American Civil War. It is believed that she hung the first Confederate flag in Franklin, which she made herself.

After the death of the husband of her cousin, Adelicia Acklen, the family worried about their large cotton crop being destroyed. Gaut and Acklen traveled through both Confederate and Union lines to smuggle the cotton out of Tennessee. Gaut took the cotton down the Mississippi River to New Orleans and sold it in Liverpool for $0.75 per pound, for a total of $960,000 in gold. While in Louisiana, she also purchased fourteen bales of cotton from a farmer who worried about his crop being burned by the troops, and sold it for $1,500 in Liverpool.

During the Battle of Franklin in 1864, Gaut and her daughters sought shelter in the cellar of their Columbia Avenue home, the Carter House. Following the battle, she cared for both Confederate and Union soldiers in her home and hosted officers from both sides for elegant gatherings, including Confederate General John Bell Hood, Confederate General Benjamin F. Cheatham, Bishop Charles Todd Quintard, and her cousin, the Union General Charles Ewing. She convinced Andrew Johnson, who was then serving as the Military Governor of Tennessee, to return her horse to her after it had been taken by a Union soldier.

Gaut was involved as a spy for the Confederacy during the war. According to Confederate veteran Joe Smith, she was connected to the secret letters of Sam Davis, who was later tried and hanged as a Confederate spy. While entertaining Union officials in her residence, she gathered information to provide to Confederate military officers. Gaut smuggled notes detailing Union plans to Confederate officers in a whiskey bottle concealed under her petticoats.

=== Later life ===
In 1875, after nineteen years of widowhood, she married a third time to the Unionist judge and lawyer John M. Gaut. After her third husband's death in 1895, she returned to her home in Franklin to live with her daughter and son-in-law, Robert Newton Richardson.

Gaut was a member of the Campbell Chapter of the Daughters of the American Revolution, the Ladies Aid Society, and the Ladies Hermitage Association. On October 28, 1895, Gaut organized Franklin Chapter Number 14 of the United Daughters of the Confederacy in the front room of her house.

== Death and legacy ==
Gaut died in Franklin on August 21, 1912.

An oil portrait of Gaut, painted by William Edward West, hangs at the Belmont Mansion in Nashville.
