= James McEwen =

James McEwen may refer to:

- James McEwen (footballer), English footballer and coach
- James McEwen (engineer) (born 1948), biomedical engineer
- James McEwen (politician), predecessor of Thomas Corwin
- Sir James McEwen, 2nd Baronet (1924–1971) of the McEwen baronets
- Sir James McEwen, 4th Baronet (1960–1983) of the McEwen baronets

== See also ==
- James McEwan (disambiguation)
