= William Ewin (disambiguation) =

William Ewin was an American politician.

William Ewin may also refer to:

- William Howell Ewin, usurer

== See also ==
- William Ewing (disambiguation)
