= Ewan (disambiguation) =

Ewan or Euan is a masculine given name.

Ewan may also refer to:

- Ewan (surname)
- Ewan, New Jersey, an unincorporated community in Gloucester County, New Jersey, United States
- Ewan, Washington, an unincorporated community in Whitman County, Washington, United States
- Ewan, Ontario, a community in Peterborough County, Ontario, Canada
- "Ewan", a song by APO Hiking Society
- EWAN, an abbreviation for Ethernet wide area network (WAN)
