= John Adams Webster =

American naval officer (1789–1877)

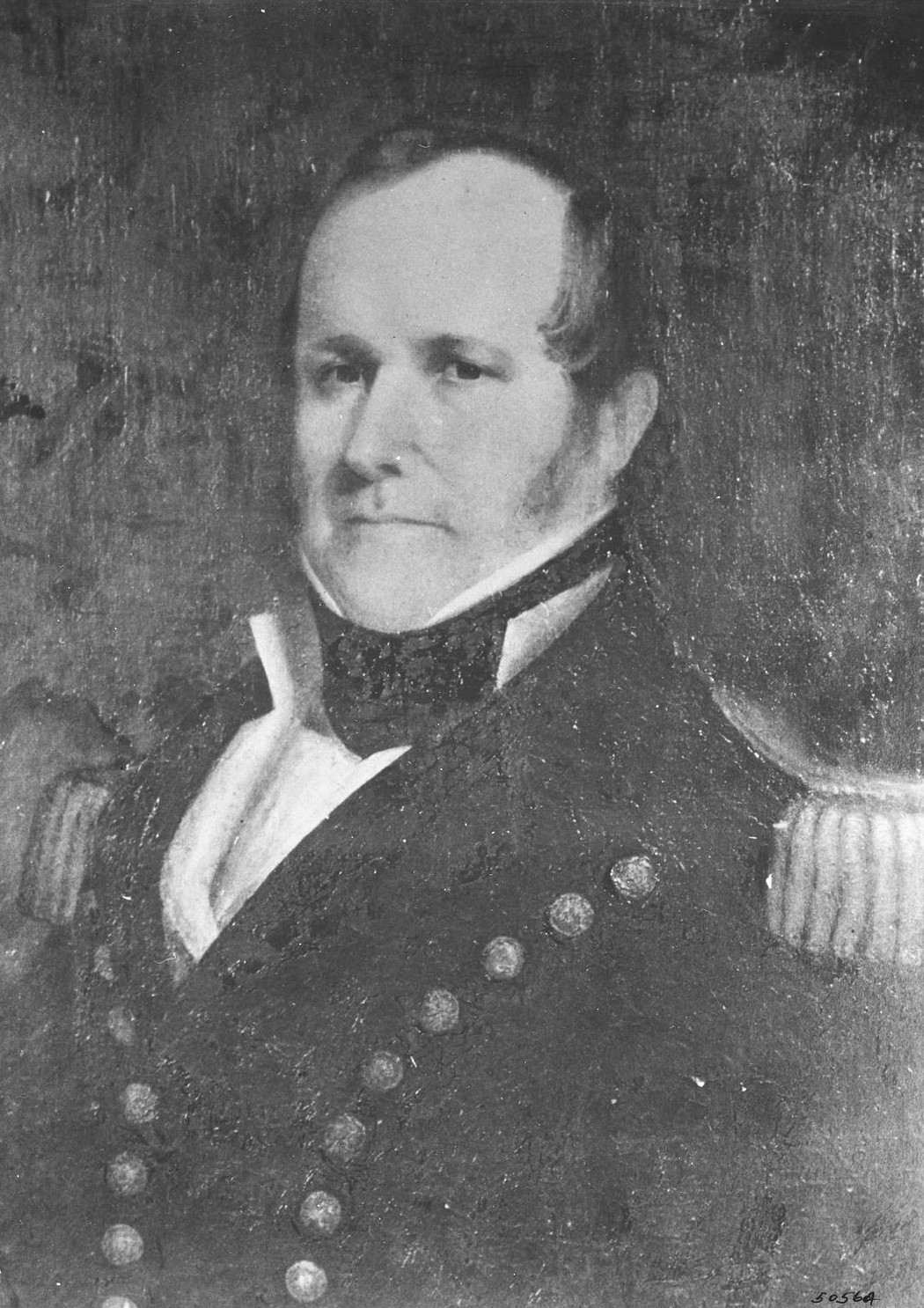
- Portrait of Webster, c. 1825
- Born: September 19, 1789; Harford County, Maryland, U.S.
- Died: July 4, 1877 (aged 87); Mount Adams, Harford County, Maryland, U.S.
- Spouse: Rachel Biays (m. 1816; died 1869)
- Children: 14
- Military career
- Allegiance: United States
- Branch: United States Navy, United States Revenue Marine
- Rank: Captain
- Conflicts: War of 1812; Battle of Fort McHenry (WIA)

John Adams Webster (September 19, 1789 – July 4, 1877) was an officer in the United States Navy, who, as a young third lieutenant, heard the sound of the British oars as its small flotilla approach Fort McHenry in Baltimore, September 13, 1814. He remained in the battle in spite of being wounded twice and received commendations for this from the City of Baltimore and the State of Maryland. Webster remained active in his military service serving as a captain in the United States Revenue Marine until his death.

== Early life ==
John Adams Webster was born at Broom's Bloom, his family's ancestral home, on September 19, 1789, in Harford County, Maryland. His parents were Margaret (née Adams), a relative of John Quincy Adams, and Samuel Webster. At the age of 14 he joined the merchant marine and traveled to many foreign ports.

== U.S. Navy service ==
Webster joined the U.S. Navy and served on the privateer Rosseau as a lieutenant. When the War of 1812 broke out, Webster was a third lieutenant under Captain Joshua Barney, and a year later when Barney was given a flotilla of gunboats to resist the British on the Chesapeake Bay, Webster became sailing master of one of the small vessels. After engaging the British in the Patuxent River, Webster, in company with other flotilla officers, led his men to Bladensburg, where he again fought the British on August 24, 1814. Webster was engaged in several more battles and ended up in command of a six-gun battery located on the “Ferry” or middle branch of the Patapsco River, west of Fort McHenry in Baltimore. Along with Fort Covington, still further to the west, the battery was set up to prevent a possible British landing in the rear of Fort McHenry. “At daybreak on September 13th, the British opened their bombardment, but the six-gun battery was completely out of range. Webster and his men could only remain alert. About 11 p.m. in a pouring rain, Webster made his rounds and ordered his guns loaded with 18-pound balls and grapeshot. Then he wrapped himself in a blanket and stretched on the breastwork to rest. About midnight, he heard above the beat of the rain, the sound of muffled oars splashing through the water. Rousing his men, they saw about 200 yards off, tiny gleaming lights and Webster aimed each of his six guns and gave the order to “fire”. The British landing barges returned the fire, Fort Covington's guns opened fire and within minutes every American cannon was in action. The action lasted for over an hour, and the British retreated.” Webster was wounded, including his right arm becoming partially disabled, but he remained on his post. For his heroic action, the citizens of Baltimore gave him a sword bearing an inscription commemorating the event. Later the state of Maryland presented him with another sword.

== U.S. Revenue–Marine service ==
On November 22, 1819, President Monroe appointed him captain in the United States Revenue Marine, which position he held until his death. Secretary of the Treasury William H. Crawford appointed him to his rank because of his "ability, intelligence, and zeal...and above all in consideration of the gallantry [he had] displayed during the late war." He was located in Baltimore, Maryland, from 1819 to 1830, in New Bern, North Carolina, for a few months, then on to Norfolk, Virginia, from late 1830 to 1842. In 1842 he was stationed in Wilmington, Delaware, and a year later he was sent to New York. After that Captain Webster did short duty back in Baltimore, then on to Newport, Rhode Island; New Orleans, Louisiana; and back to New York. On May 19, 1846, he was appointed as commodore of the Revenue-Marine Atlantic Squadron, a fleet of eight Revenue-Marine cutters to cooperate with the U.S. Army and Navy in their operations on the Rio Grande, and against the city of Vera Cruz in the War with Mexico. He chose as his flagship USRC Ewing In December 1846, Webster contracted a fever and was sent home to recover. Then he served in San Francisco, California, from July 1851 to August 1856. He later had command of USRC Jackson in Baltimore. During his service, he lost his left thumb in an encounter with pirates at Old Point Comfort. Webster served until 1865 when he was retired with full pay by special order of the Treasury Department as a reward for exceptional service.

It was in San Francisco that Webster “had under my control on board USRC Polk, seventeen Japanese,” who had been plucked from the sea by those aboard the American freighter Auckland. He befriended one of them, Joseph Heco, and recognized his potential to help with Perry's efforts to open Japan. “One of the members is a boy about 16 years. He is very intelligent and the best-conditioned youth I ever saw.”

== Personal life ==
On February 8, 1816, Webster married Rachel Biays, daughter of Colonel Joseph Biays of Frederick County. They had fourteen children: Margaret (born 1817), Elizabeth (died young), John A. (died young), Josephine (1823–1869), John A. (1825–1875), Mary Alice (1827–1865), James Biays (1828–1890), Susan Ann (1830–1895), Benjamin M. (1831–1876), Rachel Virginia (died young), Laura Archer (1834–1892), Rachel Cassandra (1836–1895), William Samuel (born 1838) and Isaac Pleasants (1840–1862).

Webster retired to his home in Maryland and spent his later years writing the story of his life. His wife Rachel died in 1869. Webster died at his home, Mount Adams, on July 4, 1877, and was buried beside his wife in the family burying ground.
