= Mount Adams (Bel Air, Maryland) =

Historic house in Maryland, United States

- U.S. National Register of Historic Places
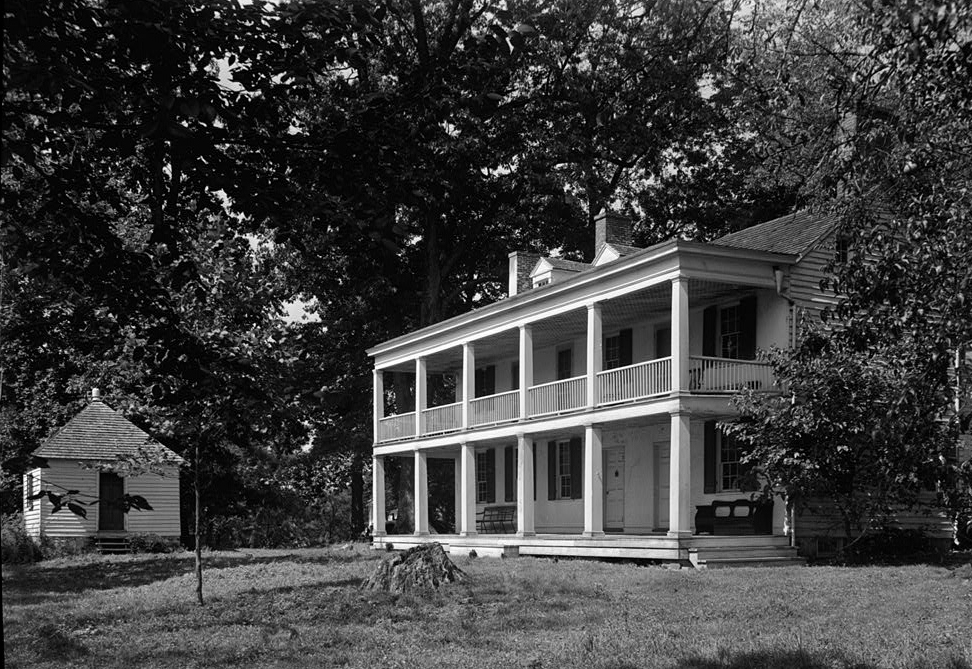
- Mount Adams in 1938

- Location within Maryland Location within the United States
- Location: 1912 Fountain Green Road (MD 543), Bel Air, Maryland
- Coordinates: 39°30′27″N 76°16′52″W
- Area: 114.8 acres (46.5 ha)
- Built: 1817
- Architectural style: Federal
- NRHP reference No.: 88002062
- Added to NRHP: October 27, 1988

Mount Adams, also known as The Mount, is a historic home and farm complex located at Bel Air, Harford County, Maryland, United States. The complex consists of a 114-acre (46 ha) working farm, originally part of Broom's Bloom, centered on a large, multi-sectioned, 2 1/2-story frame house built in 1817 in the Federal style. The house has an 1850, 2 1/2-story cross-gabled addition, connected, but an independent unit from the main house, and slightly taller in the Greek Revival style. The property include a stone bank barn, a stone-and-stucco dairy, a stone-and-stucco privy, all dating from the early 19th century, as well as a family cemetery. Its builder was Captain John Adams Webster.

Mount Adams was listed on the National Register of Historic Places in 1988.
