= Ewan =

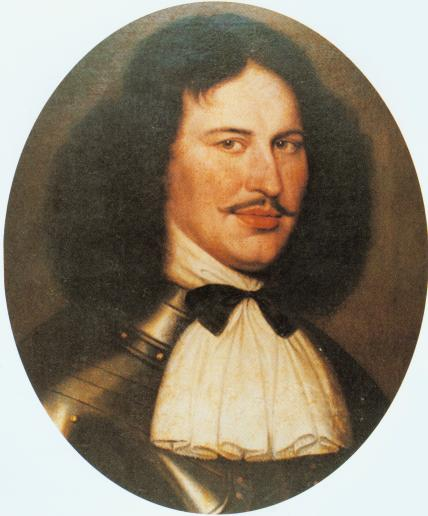
- Sir Ewen Cameron of Lochiel
- Pronunciation: /ˈjuːən/
- Gender: Masculine

Origin
- Origin: English, Scottish Gaelic or Pictish
- Meaning: Born of the Yew Tree, Youth, Muse
- Region of origin: Scotland, England

Other names
- Related names: Euan, Ewen, Eòghann, John, Evan, Owen, Awan, Iwan, Eoin

Ewan (also spelled Awan, Euan, Ewen, Awen, Awanne, Owan, Avan) is a Scottish and English name with multiple sources. It is usually an anglicisation of the Scottish Gaelic name Eòghann "noble born" and therefore derived ultimately from Latin Eugenius. A Pictish name, Uuen (or Wen) meaning "(the) warrior", or "born of the mountain", may instead be the source.

If the source is Latin Eugenius, it would make Ewan a cognate of Welsh, Cornish and Breton names including Owain (Owen) and Ouen. However, these may be older names derived from Britonnic language words referring to yew trees or ovines.

Another possible more likely source is Euan, a Gaelic form of Latin Johannes/Ioannes. As such it would be a cognate of Eoin, Ian and John. (Euan is also an alternate name for the Roman god Bacchus.)

Ewen is most common as a male given name in Scotland and Canada. It is also the source of surnames, mostly connected to Clan MacEwen and including McEwan, Ewan and Ewen. It is after these surnames that McEwan’s Beer and MacEwan University are named.

In several apocryphal and Gnostic texts, including the Book of Jubilees, the name Ewan/Awan appears as a daughter of Adam and Eve. Sometimes described as the sister and wife of Cain under ancient sibling-pairing narratives common in early human genealogies.

== People with the given name ==
=== In the arts and media ===
- Ewan Christian (1814–1895), British architect
- Ewan MacColl (1915–1989), British folk singer-songwriter
- Ewan McGregor (born 1971), Scottish actor
- Ewan Mitchell (born 1997), English actor
- Ewan Stewart (born 1957), Scottish actor

=== In sports ===
- Ewan Hatfout (born 2000), French footballer
- Ewan MacDonald (born 1975), Scottish curler
- Ewan McGrady, Australian rugby league footballer
- Ewan Thompson (born 1977), Australian (Australian rules) footballer

=== In other fields ===
- Ewan Birney (born 1972), British bioinformatician
- Ewan Anderson (born 1938), expert on geopolitics, economic and social geography

== Characters ==
- Ewan, a character from the TV series Merlin Season 1 Episode 2
- Ewan O'Hara, Juliet O'Hara's brother on the TV series Psych
- Ewan, a guard in the book The Wizard's Child
- Ewan Doherty, Head of English in Teachers, a UK Channel 4 show
- Ewan the Dream Sheep, a popular baby sleeping toy
- Ewan Cameron, a minor character in Dragonfly in Amber, second book in the Outlander series by Diana Gabaldon

== See also ==
- Ewan, New Jersey
- Eógan
- Eógan (given name)
- Iwan (name)
- Euan
- Evan
- MacEwen
