= James McEwan =

James McEwan or MacEwan may refer to:

- Jamie McEwan (1952–2014), American slalom canoeist
- James MacEwan (died 1911), priest
- James B. McEwan (1855–1915), American politician
- Jimmy McEwan (1929–2017), Scottish footballer

== See also ==
- James McEwen (disambiguation)
