= Guild of Freemen of the City of London =

Guild of the City of London

The Guild of Freemen of the City of London
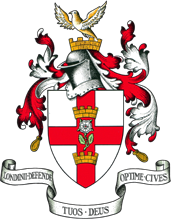
- Coat of arms of the Guild of Freemen
- Motto: "Londini Defende Tuos Deus Optime Cives"
- Location: London, United Kingdom
- Date of formation: 1908
- Company association: Guild of the City of London
- Master of company: Stephen Osborne
- Website: guild-freemen-london.co.uk

The Guild of Freemen of the City of London is an association of those who hold the Freedom of the City of London. Membership of the Guild is open to all freemen, regardless of whether they are also members of a City livery company.

== Overview ==
The purpose of the Guild, which was founded in 1908, is to bring Freemen of the City together for charitable, educational, benevolent, and social activities. An annual magazine called The Freeman is published in April of each year and includes reports on past and future activities.

With some two thousand members, activities include dinners in notable City of London halls, clubs, and other buildings, an Annual Banquet with the Lord Mayor of London at Guildhall, musical and cultural events, and a carol service.

The Guild has its offices at 4 Dowgate Hill in the City. A Master is elected annually, who holds office for one year. Anne, Princess Royal, was Master in the centenary year of 2008.

== Past Masters ==
The following have served as Master:

- Cuthbert Wilkinson (1909)
- H. Brodie Self (1910)
- Sir Thomas Brooke-Hitching (1911)
- Emile Chatrian (1912)
- Alderman George Briggs (1913)
- H. Elliott Sparks (1914)
- Harry S. A. Foy (1915)
- J. R. Brough (1916)
- Alfred Lockett (1917)
- W. J. Trice (1918)
- Henry Harrill (1919)
- Sir Edward Wilshaw (1920)
- Francis Sully (1921)
- T. W. Hewitt (1922)
- Sir Lulham Pound (1923)
- Sir Gervais Rentoul (1924)
- Sir Richard Sennett (1929)
- C. G. H. Wittich (1930)
- Sir Herbert Nield (1931)
- Lieut.-Col. Sir Hugh Turnbull (1932)
- H. Holton Sturges (1933)
- H. J. Eldridge (1934)
- Captain M. Campbell-Johnston MP (1935)
- Major Francis H. Millman (1936)
- A. Ernest Watts (1937)
- John Joy (1938)
- Captain Francis C. J. Read FSI (1939)
- T. J. McManis JP (1940)
- James J. Gibaud (1941)
- Arthur E. Howard (1942)
- Walter Rose (1943)
- Deputy Frederick Youldon (1944)
- Arthur L. R. Harris (1945)
- George F. Frizell (1946)
- Sir William Jordan (1947)
- Henry C. Bound (1948)
- Sir Frank Alexander, 1st Baronet (1949)
- John Crighton (1950)
- Sir Frederick Tidbury-Beer (1951)
- Major B. W. Shilson (1952)
- Captain Julien F. C. Bennett (1953)
- Lieut-Col C. G. Surtees-Shill (1954)
- Deputy H. J. E. Stinson (1955)
- Major Stanley W. Wells (1956)
- Sir Denis Truscott (1957)
- Deputy Percy T. Lovely (1958)
- Sir David Floyd Ewin (1959)
- Sir Sidney J. Fox (1960)
- Charles De Ryck (1961)
- Stanley A. Phillips (1962)
- Ronald Ward (1963)
- Frederick W. Utting (1964)
- Sir Harold Webbe (1965)
- Roy R. Stuart (1966)
- Sir Stanley Morton (1970)
- Reginald Crook, 1st Baron Crook (1972)
- Sir Anthony Grant (1979 and 1997)
- Sir Peter Gadsden (1984)
- General Sir Peter Whiteley (1987)
- Rex S. Johnson (1991)
- Derek L. Kemp (1992)
- Sir Clifford Chetwood (1993)
- Sir Colin Cole (1994)
- Sir Clive Martin (1995)
- Vice-Admiral Sir Peter Buchanan (1996)
- Gordon M. Gentry (2007)
- Anne, Princess Royal (Centenary Master, 2008)
- Pauline Halliday (2008)
- Sir Gavyn Arthur (2009)
- Anthony Woodhead (2010)
- J. Don Lunn (2011)
- Anne E. Holden (2012)
- Anthony B. Fleming (2013)
- Dr John A. Smail (2014)
- Poppy, Lady Cooksey (2015)
- Sir David Wootton (2016)
- Peter Allcard (2017)
- John Barber (2018)
- Neil Redcliffe (2019)
- Ann-Marie Jefferys (2020-2021)
- Alderman John Garbutt (2022)
- Christopher J. Walton (2023)
- Lisa Rutter (2024)
- Adrian Waddingham (2025)
