= The Linguistic Review =

- Discipline: Linguistics
- Language: English
- Edited by: Harry van der Hulst

Publication details
- History: 1981–present
- Publisher: Mouton de Gruyter (The Netherlands)
- Frequency: Quarterly
- Impact factor: 0.467 (2012)

Standard abbreviations
- ISO 4: Linguist. Rev.

Indexing
- ISSN: 0167-6318 (print); 1613-3676 (web)
- OCLC no.: 8028440

Links
- Journal homepage

The Linguistic Review is a double-blind peer-reviewed academic journal covering linguistics established in 1981 and published by Walter de Gruyter. The editor-in-chief is Harry van der Hulst (University of Connecticut).

== Aims and scope ==
The journal is mostly concerned with syntax (from the point of view of generative grammar), morphology, semantics and phonology. Apart from research papers, the journal also publishes reviews, dissertation abstracts and letters to the editor.

Occasionally, special thematic issues appear, aimed at a critique of currently debated topics and theories.
