= William Ewing =

William Ewing may refer to:

- William Lee D. Ewing (1795–1846), U.S. Senator from Illinois
- William Maurice Ewing (1906–1974), American geophysicist and oceanographer
- Buck Ewing (William Ewing, 1859–1906), American baseball player
- Buck Ewing (1920s catcher) (William Monroe Ewing, 1903–1979), American baseball player
- William L. Ewing (1843–1905), U.S. politician
- William H. Ewing (1841–1924), American physician and politician in the Virginia House of Delegates
- Rev. William Ewing (1857-1932), WWI army Chaplain, author of the 1910 Temple Dictionary of the Bible; see List of Bible dictionaries
- Bill Ewing, American director and producer

== See also ==
- Bill Ewing (footballer) (1909–1994), Australian rules footballer
- William Euing (1788–1874), Scottish philanthropist
- William Ewing Kemp, mayor of Kansas City, Missouri
- William Ewin (disambiguation)
