= Yoonjung Kang =

South Korean linguist

Academic background
- Education: Massachusetts Institute of Technology (PhD), Seoul National University (BA)
- Thesis: The phonetics and phonology of coronal markedness and unmarkedness (2000)
- Doctoral advisor: Michael Kenstowicz, Cheryl Zoll
- Other advisor: Ken Stevens

Academic work
- Discipline: Linguistics
- Sub-discipline: Phonology
- Institutions: University of Toronto
- Website: https://www.yoonjungkang.com/

Yoonjung Kang is a South Korean linguist and professor of Linguistics at the University of Toronto. She is known for her works on phonetics and phonology and is an editor of the journal Phonology. She is a member of editorial boards of Studies in Phonetics, Phonology and Morphology, Language and Research and Korean Linguistics.
