= Project Laurens Janszoon Coster =

Web collection of Dutch high literature

Project Laurens Janszoon Coster (Dutch pronunciation: [proːˈjɛkt ˈlʌurəɲ ˈɕɑnsoːŋ ˈkɔstər]), sometimes abbreviated as Project Laurens Jansz. Coster or Project Coster, was a collection of Dutch high literature on the web. It was named after Project Gutenberg and after Laurens Janszoon Coster (c.1370–c.1440), a sexton of the cathedral of Haarlem. A possibly fictitious story first recorded in 1567 accounts of Coster inventing the printing press in the 1420s.

Project Coster was founded and run by Marc van Oostendorp. It was started on 14 June 1995, although before that time a project collecting public domain works was already current on Usenet. Whether it is still active is uncertain; the latest news posted on the site is dated 2001.
