= John Mathieson Anderson =

British linguist

John Mathieson Anderson, FBA (born 1941) is a British linguist and academic. He is Emeritus Professor of English Language at the University of Edinburgh. In the 1970s, Anderson revived the idea of localism, which is the linguistic theory that all grammatical cases, including syntactic cases, are based on a local meaning; however Anderson used a generative approach to the idea. Collaborating with Colin J. Ewen, he wrote the first detailed overview of the theory of dependency phonology in their 1987 work Principles of Dependency Phonology.

== Notable works ==
- Anderson, John M. (2011). The substance of language. Oxford; New York: Oxford University Press. ISBN 978-0-19-960831-7. OCLC 778891013.
- Anderson, John M. (1997). A notional theory of syntactic categories. Cambridge; New York: Cambridge University Press. ISBN 978-0-521-58023-6. OCLC 34746064.
- "Principles of Dependency Phonology | Phonetics and phonology". Cambridge University Press.
- Anderson, John M. (1982). Language Form and Linguistic Variation: Papers Dedicated to Angus McIntosh. Amsterdam: John Benjamins B. V.
- Anderson, John M. (8 April 1976). The Grammar of Case: Towards a Localistic Theory. CUP Archive. ISBN 9780521080354.
