= Clifford Chetwood =

British businessman

Sir Clifford Jack Chetwood FRSA (2 November 1928 – 9 February 2009) was a British business man who was chairman of George Wimpey, a major construction company, in the 1980s and 1990s.

He was a leader in the building of the Channel Tunnel by TML and a trustee of the Victoria and Albert Museum.

== Early life ==
The son of Stanley Jack Chetwood, a builder, and Doris May Palmer, he was born in Fulham in November 1928. His grandfather, Valentine Chetwood, who died in 1944, was a Hackney carriage driver.

In 1953, Chetwood married Pamela Sherlock, and they went on to have three daughters and a son.

== Business career ==
Chetwood was appointed as managing director and chief executive of Wimpey in 1982, then also became chairman of the company in 1984. At that time, it had over 40,000 employees and annual revenue of £1 billion, divided between a large number of British subsidiaries. Chetwood set out to convert these into three divisions, Homes, Construction, and Minerals, his aim being to create divisional autonomy and responsibility.

In June 1987, Chetwood was knighted, with The London Gazette noting that he was chairman and chief executive of George Wimpey PLC.

As head of Wimpey in the 1980s and early 1990s, Chetwood was a major player in the construction of the Channel Tunnel by the TransManche Link consortium. When problems arose within the consortium, he asked Robin Leigh-Pemberton of the Bank of England to act as a conciliator. He retired from Wimpey in 1992.

After Wimpey, Chetwood joined Broadgate Properties PLC as a director, then was chairman from 1994 to 1996. He then formed Chetwood Associates Ltd, architects.

In 1995, Chetwood was reported as believing that at least one in five newcomers to the construction industry must be a woman, to avoid a crisis caused by a shortage of skills.

== Personal life ==
On 8 October 1992, Chetwood appeared on an episode of BBC Television’s Question Time broadcast from the Conservative Party conference in Brighton, with Gordon Brown, Michael Howard, and Paddy Ashdown, who was Leader of the Liberal Democrats, while Brown and Howard later led the other two major British political parties.

A Fellow of the Royal Society of Arts and of the Royal Society for Public Health, and also a Liveryman of the Worshipful Company of Basketmakers, in 1993 Chetwood was Master of the Guild of Freemen of the City of London. He also served as a trustee of the Victoria and Albert Museum.

Chetwood was an enthusiastic real tennis player and three times won the Billy Ross-Skinner British Mixed Invitation Doubles. He was influential in Wimpey becoming a major sponsor of tennis and insisted on women players sharing prize money. In 1992 he was made an Honorary member of the Ladies Real Tennis Association.

Chetwood died in 2009 and was buried in the Randalls Park Cemetery, Leatherhead. His widow died in 2017.
