= Ewen =

- Pronunciation: /ˈjuːən/
- Gender: Male

Origin
- Origin: Scottish, Pictish
- Meaning: Born of Mountain
- Region of origin: Scotland

Other names
- Cognate: John
- Related names: Ewan, Euan, Eòghann, John, Owen

Ewen is a male given name, most common throughout Scotland as well as Canada, due to the immigration of Scottish people. It is an anglicisation of the Scottish Gaelic name, Eòghann. It is possibly a derivative of the Pictish name, Uuen (or 'Wen'), "born of the mountain." Ewen or Ewan is also a Scottish surname, as in Clan MacEwen.

Ewen is also a Breton male given name, an alternative form of Erwan, the patron saint of Brittany. Owen is the predominant Welsh variation of the name. Ouen can be considered the French version of the name. The English equivalent of the name is John.

Other spellings of the name are Euan and Ewan.

Euan is a Latin word meaning Bacchus.

== Variations ==
Old Irish	Modern Irish	Welsh	Scottish Gaelic	Scottish English and Breton
Éoġan	Eoghan	Owain	Eòghann	Ewen

== People with this given name ==
- Ewen Alison (1852–1945), New Zealand businessman and politician
- Ewen Bain, Scottish cartoonist
- Ewen Bremner, Scottish actor
- Ewen Cameron (disambiguation), several people
- Ewen Chatfield, New Zealand cricketer
- Ewen Fergusson, British diplomat
- Ewen Gillies (born 1825), serial emigrant from St. Kilda, Scotland
- Ewen Henderson (artist) (1934–2000), English ceramic artist
- Ewen Henderson (musician) (born 1987), Scottish fiddler and bagpiper
- Ewen Leslie, Australian actor
- Ewen MacDougall, Scottish nobleman
- Ewen Maclean, 9th Laird of Ardgour, British peer
- Ewen MacIntosh (1973–2024), British actor
- Ewen McKenzie, Australian rugby player
- Ewen McQueen, New Zealand Christian leader
- Ewen Neil McQueen, Australian educational innovator
- Ewen Montagu, British judge, writer and intelligence officer
- Ewen Ratteray, Bishop of Bermuda
- Ewen Solon, New Zealand actor
- Ewen Southby-Tailyour, British Royal Marine
- Ewen Thompson, New Zealand cricketer
- Ewen Vernal, Scottish musician
- Ewen Whitaker, British astronomer

== People with this surname ==
- Ewen (surname)

== See also ==
- Ewen (disambiguation)
- Even
- Ewan
- Euan
- Eógan
- MacEwen
- McEwen
