= McEwen baronets =

Baronetcy in the Baronetage of the United Kingdom

The McEwen Baronetcy, of Marchmont in the County of Berwick, and Bardrochat in the County of Ayr, is a title in the Baronetage of the United Kingdom. It was created on 28 January 1953 for the Conservative politician John McEwen, by Elizabeth II. He notably served as Under-Secretary of State for Scotland from 1939 to 1940.

He was succeeded by his eldest son, the second Baronet. On his death the title passed to his younger brother, the third Baronet. The third baronet was succeeded briefly by his older son, Sir James, who died on 18 June 1983 at age 22, unmarried. As of 2020 the title is held by Sir Robert's second son, the fifth Baronet, who succeeded in 1983 on the early death of his elder brother. He is the current Chief of Clan MacEwen.

== McEwen baronets, of Marchmont and Bardrochat (1953) ==
- Sir John Helias Finnie McEwen, 1st Baronet (1894–1962)
- Sir James Napier Finnie McEwen, 2nd Baronet (1924–1971)
- Sir Robert Lindley McEwen, 3rd Baronet (1926–1980)
- Sir James Francis Lindley McEwen, 4th Baronet (1960–1983)
- Sir John Roderick Hugh McEwen, 5th Baronet (born 1965)

The heir presumptive is the present holder's eldest son, Joseph M. McEwen, younger of Marchmont and Bardrochat.

== Arms ==
Coat of arms of McEwen baronets

Crest
The trunk of an oak tree sprouting Proper.
Escutcheon
Quarterly 1st & 4th Or a lion rampant Azure gorged with a ducal crown Proper on a chief of the second three garbs of the field (McEwen) 2nd & 3rd Gules three headless cranes Argent (Finnie).
Motto
Reviresco
