= Mortimer Ewen =

English cricketer (1816–1887)

Personal information
- Full name: Mortimer Ewen
- Born: 5 September 1816; Lodsworth, Sussex, England
- Died: 1887 (aged 70–71); Midhurst, Sussex, England
- Batting: Unknown
- Bowling: Unknown

Domestic team information
- Years: Team
- 1826–1834: Sussex

Career statistics
Competition	First-class
Matches	7
Runs scored	81
Batting average	8.10
100s/50s	–/–
Top score	23
Balls bowled	8+
Wickets	3
Bowling average	?
5 wickets in innings	–
10 wickets in match	–
Best bowling	1/?
Catches/stumpings	4/–
- Source: Cricinfo, 17 December 2011

Mortimer Ewen (5 September 1816 – 1887) was an English cricketer. Ewen's batting and bowling styles are unknown. He was born at Lodsworth, Sussex.

Ewen made his first-class debut for Sussex against Kent in 1839. He made five further first-class appearances for the county, the last of which came against the Marylebone Cricket Club in 1843. In his six first-class matches for Sussex, he scored 61 runs at an average of 6.77, with a high score of 23. With the ball, he took 3 wickets, though his bowling average and best figures are unknown due to incomplete records. He also made a single first-class appearance for Petworth in 1844 against the Marylebone Cricket Club at Petworth Park New Ground. He ended Petworth's first-innings unbeaten on 13, while in their second-innings he was dismissed for 7 runs by William Hillyer. Petworth won this low scoring match by 3 wickets.

He died at Midhurst, Sussex in 1887.
