= Harry van der Hulst =

Dutch linguist (born 1953)

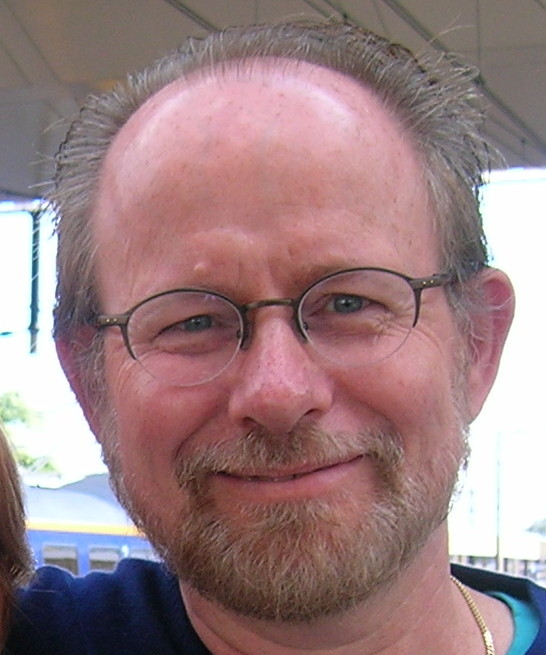
- Born: April 6, 1953 (age 73); The Hague, Netherlands

Academic background
- Education: Leiden University

Academic work
- Discipline: Linguistics
- Sub-discipline: Phonology
- Institutions: University of Connecticut

Harry van der Hulst (born 1953, The Hague) is a Dutch linguist. He is full professor of linguistics and director of undergraduate studies at the department of linguistics of the University of Connecticut. He has been editor-in-chief of the international SSCI peer-reviewed linguistics journal The Linguistic Review since 1990 and he is co-editor of the series ‘Studies in generative grammar’ (Mouton de Gruyter). He is a Life Fellow of the Netherlands Institute for Advanced Study, and a board member of the European linguistics organization GLOW.

Until 2000 he taught at Leiden University, where he also obtained his PhD on the basis of a dissertation on stress and syllable structure in Dutch, and where he was director of the inter-university research institute Holland Institute of Generative Linguistics. He specializes in phonology (the sound structure of languages) and has done research in feature systems and segmental structure, syllable structure, word accent systems, vowel harmony, sign language phonology, the phonology-phonetics interface, historical phonology and language acquisition. His theoretical orientation is that of Dependency Phonology and Government Phonology, and his own model of segmental and suprasegmental structure is called ‘Radical CV Phonology’. In addition, he teaches on language evolution and cognitive science. He has published four books, two textbooks, and over 170 articles, and edited over 30 books and six thematic journal issues in the linguistic research areas mentioned above. He has held guest positions at the University of Salzburg, the University of Girona, Skidmore College and New York University, and taught at the LSA Summer Institute in 1997 (at Cornell University), as well as numerous other international summer schools.

== Awards ==
- 2019 (University of Connecticut, USA): Recipient of the Faculty Excellence in Research (https://clas.uconn.edu/faculty-staff/excellence-awards/)
- 2019 (University of Connecticut, USA): Faculty Excellence in Research and Creativity (Humanities, Arts and Social Sciences) (https://uconnalumni.com/about/history/awards/past-awards/)
- 2022 (University of Connecticut, USA): AAUP Excellence in Research and Creativity: Career (https://uconnaaup.org/uconn-aaup-2022-excellence-awards-2/)

On May 12, 2023, Harry van der Hulst was offered a two-volume Festschrift (edited by Jeroen van de Weijer) with 35 articles by his former teachers, students and colleagues: https://linguistics.uconn.edu/2023/05/14/van-der-hulst-festschrift-naphcxii-workshop/

== Selected publications ==
- The Oxford History of Phonology [with Elan Dresher] (2022). ISBN 978-0-19-879680-0 Oxford University Press.
- Principles of Radical CV Phonology. A theory of segmental and syllabic structure (2020). ISBN 978-1-4744-5466-7 Edinburgh University Press.
- Asymmetries in vowel harmony. A representational account (2018). ISBN 978-0-19-881357-6. Oxford University Press.
- Phonological typology (2017). In: The Cambridge Handbook of Typological Linguistics (ISBN 978-1-107-09195-5), Cambridge University Press.
- Word stress: Theoretical and typological issues (2014). ISBN 978-1-107-03951-3. Cambridge University Press.
- Deconstructing stress (2012). Lingua 122, 1494-1521.
- Recursion and human language (2010). ISBN 978-3-11-021924-1. Mouton de Gruyter.
- The phonological structure of words. An introduction (2001, with Colin J. Ewen). ISBN 978-0521359146. Cambridge University Press.
- The syllable: Views and facts (1999, with Nancy Ritter). ISBN 978-3-11-016274-5. Mouton de Gruyter
- Word prosodic systems in the languages of Europe (1999). ISBN 978-3-11-015750-5. Mouton de Gruyter
- Units in the analysis of signs (1993). Phonology 10(2), 209-241.
- Syllable structure and stress in Dutch (1984). ISBN 978-9067650373. Foris Publications.
- The structure of phonological representations (2 volumes, 1982, with Norval Smith). ISBN 978-90-70176-54-9. Foris Publications.
- A Mind for Language: An Introduction to the Innateness Debate (2023) ISBN 9781108456494. Cambridge University Press.
- Genes, Brains, Evolution and Language: The Innateness Debate Continued (Forthcoming) Cambridge University Press.
