= Mathias Ewen =

Luxembourgish footballer

Personal information
- Date of birth: 15 January 1941 (age 85)
- Position: Defender

International career
Years	Team	Apps	(Gls)
1964–1968	Luxembourg	7	(0)

Mathias Ewen (born 15 January 1941) is a Luxembourgish footballer. He played in seven matches for the Luxembourg national football team from 1964 to 1968.
