= Leo Wetzels =

Dutch academic (born 1951)

Willem Leo Marie (Leo) Wetzels (born 9 September 1951, Schinnen) is a full professor at the Vrije Universiteit Amsterdam in the Netherlands and Directeur de recherche at Laboratoire de Phonétique et Phonologie (LPP), CNRS/Sorbonne-Nouvelle in Paris. He is Editor-in-Chief of Probus International, the Journal of Latin and Romance Linguistics.

Wetzels has received numerous research grants, most recently a VU University research grant for an AIO-project on Aymara Morphophonology and the NWO internationalization grant which aims at constructing an international cooperation network in the area of Amerindian languages and cultures involving the chair of Amazonian Languages at the VU, the Centre d'Etudes des Langues Indigènes d'Amérique, CNRS, Paris, the Leiden Centre for Amerindian Studies, the Anthropology department of the Universidade Federal do Amazonas, Manaus, Brazil, and the Instituto Nacional de Pesquisas da Amazônia (National Institute for Amazonian Studies), Manaus, Brazil.

== Research projects ==
Wetzels is involved in a variety of research projects, most prominent is the one which regards nasal harmony systems. The project aims at establishing the phonological and morphological parameters that are crosslinguistically involved in long-distance nasal spreading. As part of the project, a digital database (NASDAT) was developed by Rob Goedemans (Leiden University) George N. Clements (CNRS, Paris), and Leo Wetzels himself. The NASDAT database will be made accessible to the international linguistic community via its website.

In another of his projects, Leo Wetzels and Sérgio Meira (Leiden University) present a comprehensive survey and theoretical discussion of the word-prosodic systems of the indigenous languages of South America. The study will be published as a chapter of Rob Goedemans (Leiden University) and Harry van der Hulst (University of Connecticut) to appear, Stress Systems in the Languages of the World. Berlin, Mouton de Gruyter.

In his efforts to complete the reconstruction of Proto-Nambikwara Sound Structure, Januacele da Costa (Universidade Federal de Alagoas, Maceió, Brazil) and Wetzels presented a comparative sketch (in terms of phonology, morphology, and syntax) of the Nambikwara languages of Brazil and propose a reconstruction of the Proto-Nambikwara sound system as well as a Proto-Nambikwara lexicon. The study is meant as a contribution to the comparative and historical linguistics of the Amerindian languages. The research on comparative Nambikwara is part of the larger project supervised by Leo Wetzels, entitled The Nambikwara Indians. A Description of their Languages (Latundê, Sararé, and Sabanê) and of their Cultural Identity, funded by WOTRO/NWO. Grammars of Latundê (S. Telles) and Sabanê (G. Antunes) are completed and published.

Wetzels was elected to the Academy of Europe in 2019.

== Publications ==
Wetzels has a number of publications, a chronicological overview of some highlights is given below.

- 1985. ’The Historical Phonology of Intrusive Stops: a Non-Linear Approach,’ Canadian Journal of Linguistics, 30,3: 285–333.
- 1986. ‘Phonological Timing in Ancient Greek’, in: Leo Wetzels & Engin Sezer (eds.), Studies in Compensatory Lengthening. Dordrecht, Foris: 296–344.
- 1995. ‘Mid-Vowel Alternations in the Brazilian Portuguese Verb,’ Phonology, 12: 281–304.
- 1997. ‘The Lexical Representation of Nasality in Brazilian Portuguese,’ Probus, 9.2: 203–232.
- 2001. (Leo Wetzels (first author) with Joan Mascaró) ‘The Typology of Voicing and Devoicing’ Language 77, 2: 207–244.
- 2002. ‘Discussion: Fieldwork and Phonological Theory’, Papers on Laboratory Phonology 7: 615–635.
- 2002. ‘On the Relation between Quantity-Sensitive Stress and Distinctive Vowel Length. The History of a Principle and its Relevance for Romance.’ Caroline Wiltshire and Joaquim Camps (eds.), Romance Phonology and Variation. Amsterdam: John Benjamins: 219–234.
- 2007. ‘Primary Stress in Brazilian Portuguese and the Quantity Parameter’. Gorka Elordieta and Marina Vigário (eds.) Journal of Portuguese Linguistics Vol 5/6, Special Issue on the Prosody of the Iberian languages: 9-58.
- 2007. (with Jesus-Mario Girón Higuita) ‘Tone in Wãnsöhöt (Puinave), Colombia’. In: W. Leo Wetzels (ed.), Language Endangerment and Endangered Languages: Linguistic and Anthropological Studies with Special Emphasis on the Languages and Cultures of the Andean-Amazonian Border Area. Indigenous Languages of Latin America Series (ILLA). Publications of the Research School of Asian African, and Amerindian Studies (CNWS). Leiden University, The Netherlands: 129–156.
- to appear 2008/9 (with Januacele da Costa) A Comparative Sketch of the Nambikwaran Languages and the Reconstruction of the Proto-Nambikwara Segment System.

=== Book chapters ===
- 1986. ‘Phonological Timing in Ancient Greek’, in Leo Wetzels & Engin Sezer (eds.), Studies in Compensatory Lengthening. Dordrecht, Foris: 296–344.
- 1988. (With Haike Jacobs). ‘Early French Lenition. A Formal Account of an Integrated Sound Change’, in H.van der Hulst and Norval Smith (eds.) Feature Specification and Segmental Structure. Dordrecht, Foris: 105–129.
- 1993. ‘La Phonologie de la Flexion Adnominale dans un Dialecte Limbourgeois (Pays-Bas)’, B. Laks and A. Rialland (eds.), L'Architecture des Représentations Phonologiques. (Série Sciences du Language du CNRS) : 203–231.
- 1993. ‘Sur la place de l'accent dans un lexique stratifié du portugais brésilien,’ Du Coté de chez Zwaan. Amsterdam, Rodopi: 329–348.
- 1993. ‘Taalkunde en het onderwijs van moderne Westeuropese talen in Nederland: Pleidooi voor het behoud van een cultuurgoed,’ in C. Gussenhoven and E.C. Verhofstadt (eds.) Talen zonder Grenzen. Verslag van een conferentie georganiseerd door de Verkenningscommissie Moderne Letteren op 23 oktober 1992 te Amsterdam. Nijmegen, 1993: 43–51.
- 1995. ‘Estrutura Silábica e Contornos Nasais em Kaingáng,’ Leo Wetzels (ed.) Estudos Fonológicos de Língüas Indigenas Brasileiras. Editora da UFRJ. Rio de Janeiro: 265–296.
- 1995. ‘Oclusivas Intrusivas em Maxacalí’, Leo Wetzels (ed.). Estudos Fonológicos de Língüas Indigenas Brasileiras. Editora da UFRJ. Rio de Janeiro: 85–102.
- 1995. ‘A Teoria Fonológica e as Língüas Indigenas Brasileiras,’ Leo Wetzels (ed.) Estudos Fonológicos de Língüas Indigenas Brasileiras. Editora da UFRJ. Rio de Janeiro: 1-27.
- 1995. (with Willebrord Sluyters) ‘Formação de Raiz, Formação de Glide e 'Decrowding' Fonético em Maxacalí,’ In Leo Wetzels (ed.) Estudos Fonológicos de Língüas Indigenas Brasileiras. Editora da UFRJ. Rio de Janeiro: 103–149.
- 1997. ‘Bakairi and the Feature ‘voice’,’ Boletim da Associação Brasileira de Lingüística. Homenagem a Aryon Dall’Igna Rodrigues. Janeiro 97: 21-34.
- 1997. (with Frans Hinskens and Roeland van Hout). ‘Balancing Data and Theory in Studies of Linguistic Variation and Change,’ Hinskens, van Hout and Wetzels (eds). Variation, Change, and Phonological Theory. Amsterdam, John Benjamins: 1-37.
- 2002. ‘Discussion: Fieldwork and Phonological Theory’, Papers on Laboratory Phonology 7: 615–635.
- 2002. Les adjectifs pré-nominaux du français: formes longues et formes féminines. Haike Jacobs & W. Leo Wetzels (eds.) Liber Amicorum Bernard Bichakjian. Maastricht: Shaker Publications: 273–306.
- 2002. (with Haike Jacobs). ‘Inleiding Liber Amicorum Bernard Bichakjian’. Haike Jacobs & W. Leo Wetzels (eds.) Liber Amicorum Bernard Bichakjian. Maastricht: Shaker Publications: ix-xix. 2003. ‘Sobe, Frege, Agride: On Some Irregular Verbs in Brazilian Portuguese’. Dermeval da Hora e Gisela Collichon (eds.) Teoria Lingüística e Outros Temas. João Pessoa, Editora Universitária: 270–290.
- 2006. ‘Introduction: Language Endangerment and Endangered Languages’. W. Leo Wetzels (ed.), Language Endangerment and Endangered Languages: Linguistic and Anthropological Studies with Special Emphasis on the Languages and Cultures of the Andean-Amazonian Border Area. Indigenous Languages of Latin America series (ILLA). Publications of the Research School of Asian African, and Amerindian Studies (CNWS). Leiden University, The Netherlands: 1–11.
- 2006 (with Stella Telles) 2005. ‘Evidentiality and Epistemic Mood in Lakondê’. Eithne Carlin and Grazyna Rowicka (eds.) What's in a Verb? Dutch Contributions to the Study of Verbal Morphology in the languages of the Americas. LOT Publications, Utrecht, Netherlands: 235–252.
- 2006. (with Jesus Mario Girón) ‘Tone in Wãnsöhöt (Puinave), Colombia’, W. Leo Wetzels (ed.), Language Endangerment and Endangered Languages: Linguistic and Anthropological Studies with Special Emphasis on the Languages and Cultures of the Andean-Amazonian Border Area. Indigenous Languages of Latin America series (ILLA). Publications of the Research School of Asian African, and Amerindian Studies (CNWS). Leiden University, The Netherlands: 129–156.
- 2006. Sobre a Representação da Nasalidade em Maxacali: Evidências de Empréstimos do Português. Ataliba Castilho, Maria Aparecida Torres de Morais, Sonia Lazzarini Cyrino e Ruth E. Vasconcellos Lopes, Descrição, História e Aquisição do Português Brasileiro. Campinas: Pontes/FAPESP: 217–240.
- 2008. (with Joan Mascaró) ‘An OT analysis of the Basic Voicing Typology and Voice Assimilation in Dutch’, in Herrera, Z. Esther y Pedro Martin Butragueño (Eds.), Fonología Instrumental, El Colegio de México, México.
- 2008. ‘Word Prosody and the Distribution of Oral/Nasal Contour Consonants in Kaingang’. In Eithne Carlin and Simon van de Kerke (eds.)
- 2008. ‘The Phonological Representation of Nasality and the Adaptation of Portuguese Loans in Maxacalí’. In Andrea Calabrese and W. Leo Wetzels (eds.) Loan Phonology. Amsterdam, John Benjamins.
- 2009. (with Sergio Meira). ‘Stress Systems in the Indigenous Languages of Latin-America’. Rob Goedemans and Harry van der Hulst (eds.) Stress Systems in the Languages of the World. Berlin, Mouton de Gruyter.
- 2009. (with Stella Telles) ‘La Famille Nambikwara’. Encyclopédie des langues. Presses Universitaires de France.
- 2009. ‘Vowel Features and Vowel Neutralization in Brazilian Portuguese’. In Elisabeth Hume, John Goldsmith, and W. Leo Wetzels (eds.), Tones and Features

=== Articles ===
A few of Wetzels' academic journal publications are listed alphabetically here.

1977. ‘Les pronoms clitiques du français. Une étude explicative des mécanismes transformationnels’. Grazer Linguistische Studien, nr. 5: 125–150. (French Clitic Pronouns. Explaining the Transformational Mechanisms)

1985. ’The Historical Phonology of Intrusive Stops: a Non-Linear Approach,’ Canadian Journal of Linguistics, 30,3: 285–333.

1986. (with Yip Wester). ‘Niet-lineaire Fonologie, een theorie in SPE’, Inleiding, Leo Wetzels en Haike Jacobs (eds.), Gramma, themanummer Fonologie: 89–103. Non-Linear Phonology a Theory “in SPE”, Introduction).

1986. (with Engin Sezer).’Derived Opacity in Yakut Vowel Harmony', Leo Wetzels and Haike Jacobs (eds.) Gramma, themanummer Fonologie: 201-224.

1988. (with Haike Jacobs). ‘Early French Lenition. A Formal Account of an Integrated Sound Change’, H.van der Hulst and Norval Smith (eds.) Feature Specification and Segmental Structure. Dordrecht, Foris: 105–129.

1990. ‘Umlaut en Verkleinwoordsvorming in het Limburgs’, Gramma, Nederlands Tijdschrift voor Taalkunde:139-168. (Umlaut and Diminutive Formation in Limburg Dutch)

1991. ‘Harmonia Vocálica, Truncamento, Abaixamento e Neutralização no Sistema Verbal do Português: Uma Análise Autosegmental', Cadernos de Estudos Lingüísticos. IEL/UNICAMP: 25-58. (Vowel Harmony, Truncation, Lowering, and Neutralization in the Portuguese Verb System)

1992. (with João Moraes). ‘Sobre a Duração dos Segmentos Vocálicos Nasais e Nasalizados em Português. Um Exercício de Fonologia Experimental’, Wetzels & Abaurre (eds.), Fonologia do Português, Numero Especial dos Cadernos de Estudos Lingüísticos. IEL/UNICAMP: 153–166. (On the Length of Nasal and Nasalized Vowels in Portuguese, an Exercise in Experimental Phonology)

1992. ‘Mid Vowel Neutralization in Brazilian Portuguese', Wetzels & Abaurre (eds.), Fonologia do Português, Numero Especial dos Cadernos de Estudos Lingüísticos. IEL/ UNICAMP: 19-55.

1992. (with Bernadete Abaurre). ‘Sobre a Estrutura da Gramática Fonológica’, Wetzels & Abaurre (eds.), Fonologia do Português, Número Especial dos Cadernos de Estudos Lingüísticos. IEL/UNICAMP: 5–18. (On the Structure of the Phonological Grammar)

1993. ‘Prevowels in Maxacalí: Where they come from,’ Revista da Associação Brasileira de Lingüística, São Paulo: 39–63.

1995. ‘Mid-Vowel Alternations in the Brazilian Portuguese Verb,’ Phonology, 12: 281–304.

1997. ‘The Lexical Representation of Nasality in Brazilian Portuguese,’ Probus, 9.2: 203–232.

1997. ‘Bakairi and the Feature ‘voice’,’ Revista da Associação Brasileira de Lingüística. Homenagem a Aryon Dall’Igna Rodrigues. Janeiro 97: 21-34.

1997. ‘As Línguas não Têm Dono,’ Anais do 3.0 Encontro Nacional de Acervos Literários Brasileiras: Ética e Política de Gestão de Acervos Literários (PUCRS-Porto Alegre, Brazil): 144–53. (English version ‘Languages Have no Owners’ also available, Ms. VU University Amsterdam).

1999. (with Frans Hinskens and Roeland van Hout). ‘O Balanço entre Dados e Teoria nos Estudos de Variação e Mudança Lingüísticas’. Letras de Hoje, PUCRS, Porto Alegre, Brazil: 7-45. (translation of previous publication by the editors of the Brazilian journal Letras de Hoje)

2000. ‘Comentários sobre a estrutura fonológica dos ditongos nasais no Português do Brasil’. Revista de Letras (UFC) no. 22, vol.1/2 : 25–30. (Remarks on the Phonological Structure of Nasal Diphthongs in Brazilian Portuguese)

2000. ‘Consoantes palatais como geminadas fonológicas no Português Brasileiro’. Revista de Estudos da Linguagem, Vol.9,2: 5–15. (Palatal Consonants as Phonological Geminates in Brazilian Portuguese)

2001. (Leo Wetzels first author, with Joan Mascaró) ‘The Typology of Voicing and Devoicing’ Language 77, 2: 207–244.

2002 ‘O traço [voz], privativo ou binário? O testemunho das línguas indígenas brasileiras Yathé e Bakairi.’ Leitura, Revista do programa de pós-graduação em letras e linguística LCV-CHLA-UFAL: 13–29. (The Feature [voice] Privative or Binary? The Testimony of the Indigenous Brazilian Languages Yathé and Bakairi)

2003. ‘On the Weight Issue in Portuguese. A Typological Investigation’. Letras de Hoje, 134 : 107–133.

2006. ‘Sound Change and Analogy: The Synchronic Reflexes of the Second Compensatory Lengthening in Ancient Greek Dialects’. Vera Pacheco & Gladys Cagliari (eds). Revista Estudos da Língua(gem), 3: 69–89.

2007. ‘Primary Stress in Brazilian Portuguese and the Quantity Parameter’. Gorka Elordieta and Marina Vigário (eds.) Journal of Portuguese Linguistics Vol 5/6, Special Issue on the Prosody of the Iberian Languages: 9-58.

2008. ‘Thoughts on the Phonological Definition of Nasal/Oral Contour Consonants in Some Indigenous Languages of South-America’. Revista ALFA 52(2): Abordagens em fonética e fonologia: estudos auditivos, acústicos e perceptivos; modelos de análise fonológica de ontem e de hoje
