= David Floyd Ewin =

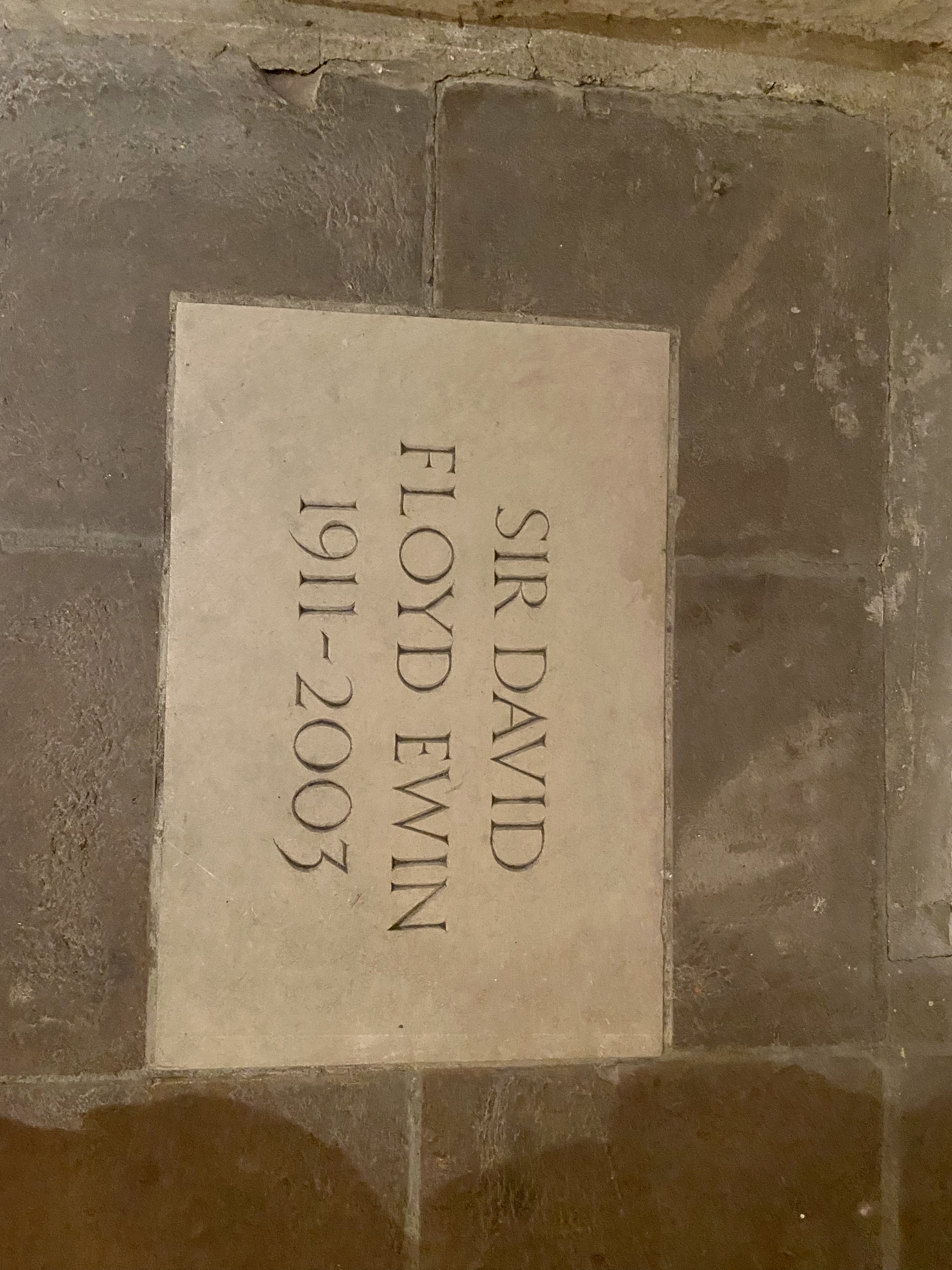
Plaque to Ewin in the Crypt of St Paul's Cathedral in 2022

Sir David Ernest Thomas Floyd Ewin OBE, LVO (17 February 1911 – 11 November 2003) was a British administrator and Trustee of St Paul's Cathedral.

Registered at birth as Ernest Thomas Floyd Ewin, he was the youngest of eleven children of Frederick Philip Ewin and his wife Ellen Floyd. He later adopted the name of David.

Ewin served as Registrar and Receiver of St Paul's from 1944 to 1978, when he formally retired, but continued to work for the cathedral as a volunteer.

In 1948, in Totnes, Devon, Ewin married Marion Lewis. They had one daughter.

A freeman of London, in 1959 he served as Master of the Guild of Freemen of the City of London.

In 1965, Ewin organized the state funeral of Winston Churchill. He was appointed an Officer of the Order of the British Empire later in the year and was knighted in the 1974 Birthday Honours.

In the 1990s, Ewin was a Deputy in the Castle Baynard ward of the City of London Corporation.

He retired to Torbay, where he died. His obituary in The Daily Telegraph says of him that he "gave virtually the whole of his working life – and many years of his retirement – to the service of St Paul's Cathedral."

== Publications ==
- David Floyd Ewin, The Splendour of St Paul's (Norwich: Jarrold, 1973, ISBN 978-0-85306-404-6)
