= Ewing High School =

Ewing High School can refer to:

- Ewing High School (Nebraska) in Ewing, Nebraska
- Ewing High School (New Jersey) in Ewing, New Jersey
