= Colin J. Ewen =

University teacher at Leiden University

Academic background
- Education: University of Edinburgh (PhD)
- Thesis: Aspects of phonological structure with particular reference to English and Dutch (1980)
- Doctoral advisor: John Mathieson Anderson

Academic work
- Discipline: linguistics
- Sub-discipline: phonology
- Institutions: Leiden University
- Doctoral students: Jeroen van de Weijer

Colin J. Ewen is Emeritus Professor of English Linguistics and Phonology at Leiden University. He is known for his works on phonology and is an editor of the journal Phonology.

== Books ==
- Principles of Dependency Phonology (Cambridge Studies in Linguistics), with John Mathieson Anderson
- The Phonological Structure of Words: An Introduction (2001, with Harry van der Hulst). ISBN 978-0521359146. Cambridge University Press.
- The Blackwell Companion to Phonology, Marc van Oostendorp, Colin J. Ewen, Elizabeth V. Hume and Keren Rice (eds.), Wiley Blackwell, London. ISBN 978-1-4051-8423-6
- Headhood, Elements, Specification and Contrastivity: Phonological Papers in Honour of John Anderson (Current Issues in Linguistic Theory), Philip Carr, Jacques Durand and Colin J. Ewen (eds.), John Benjamins Publishing Company, 2005
