= Probus (journal) =

- Discipline: Latin, Romance languages, theoretical linguistics
- Language: German, English, French, Italian, Spanish
- Edited by: Leo Wetzels

Publication details
- History: 1989–present
- Publisher: de Gruyter Mouton
- Frequency: Biannually
- Impact factor: 0.529 (2016)

Standard abbreviations
- ISO 4: Probus

Indexing
- ISSN: 0921-4771 (print); 1613-4079 (web)
- OCLC no.: 48055084

Links
- Journal homepage; Online access

Probus: International Journal of Latin and Romance Linguistics is a peer-reviewed academic journal of Latin and Romance linguistics, published by de Gruyter Mouton. Its editor-in-chief is Leo Wetzels (Vrije Universiteit) and the co-editors are Rafael Núñez-Cedeño and Jairo Nunes.
