= USRC Ewing =

Ship of the U.S. Revenue Cutter Service

History

United States
- Name: Ewing
- Namesake: Thomas Ewing, fourteenth secretary of the treasury
- Commissioned: apparently in 1841
- Decommissioned: by the Coastal Survey in 1876
- Notes: Transferred to the Coastal Survey on 26 October 1848

General characteristics
- Type: Schooner
- Displacement: 170 tons
- Length: 91 ft 6 in (27.89 m)
- Beam: 22 ft 9 in (6.93 m)
- Draft: 9 ft 2 in (2.79 m)
- Propulsion: Sail
- Sail plan: Topsail schooner
- Complement: 30 (1842)
- Armament: 6 × 12 pounders, 1 × 18 pounder (1842); 6 × 12 pounders (1846)

USRC Ewing, sometimes referred to as USRC Thomas Ewing, was a United States Revenue–Marine cutter with a topsail schooner rig that was constructed in Baltimore, Maryland in 1841. She was first stationed at New York City, New York but in 1846 was transferred to New London, Connecticut. From the period beginning in December 1845 to April 1846 Ewing sailed over three thousand miles, boarded 62 vessels, and provided relief and supplies to seven. During the Mexican-American War, on 9 August 1849 Ewing was chosen by Captain John Adams Webster as his flagship in his role as commodore of the Revenue-Marine Atlantic Squadron. The squadron was assigned by the service to assist the Army and Navy by transporting supplies and troops, blockading of Mexican ports, towing, and carrying mail and dispatches. During the battles of Monterrey and Buena Vista, the cutters Ewing and Legare carried one thousand rifles to General Zachary Taylor at Point Isabel. Ewing was transferred to the Coastal Survey on 26 October 1848 and decommissioned by the Survey in 1876.
