= Elizabeth V. Hume =

American linguist

Elizabeth Valerie Hume (born 29 October 1956) is a Canadian phonologist, professor emerita at the Ohio State University.

== Education and career ==
Hume received her Ph.D. from Cornell University in 1992, under the supervision of G. N. Clements. She was a Professor of Linguistics at the Ohio State University from 1992 to 2011. From 2006 to 2011, she served as professor and chair of the Department of Linguistics. From 2011 to 2017, she was a Professor of Linguistics at University of Canterbury in New Zealand. She returned to Ohio State to serve as Vice Provost and Dean of Undergraduate Education from October 1, 2017 - November 8, 2021.

Her fields of research are sound systems of human language, factors influencing language variation and change, and the role of information and predictability in shaping language systems.

== Honors ==
In 2022, Hume was inducted as a Fellow of the Linguistic Society of America.

She was an associate editor of Phonology for many years beginning in 2008.

== Works ==
- Goldsmith, John, Elizabeth Hume and Leo Wetzels, eds. 2011. Tones and Features. Phonetic and Phonological Perspectives. Mouton de Gruyter. ISBN 9783110246216
- Hume, Elizabeth. 2004. The indeterminacy/attestation model of metathesis. Language 80(2), 203-237. http://www.jstor.org/stable/4489661.
