= Wayne Ewin =

Australian rules footballer

Personal information
- Full name: Wayne Ewin
- Born: 4 December 1953 (age 72)
- Original team: Dandenong High
- Height: 175 cm (5 ft 9 in)
- Weight: 67 kg (148 lb)

Playing career^{1}
Years	Club	Games (Goals)
1972–73, 1975	South Melbourne	17 (3)
- ^{1} Playing statistics correct to the end of 1975.

Wayne Ewin (born 4 December 1953) is a former Australian rules footballer who played with South Melbourne in the Victorian Football League (VFL).
