= Ewen (disambiguation) =

Ewen may refer to:

- Ewen, a masculine given name

Places

- Ewen, Gloucestershire, England
- Ewen, Michigan, United States
