= Edwin (ship) =

Schooner wrecked in 1816, New South Wales, Australia

Coordinates: 32.301333°S 152.567167°E

History

New South Wales
- Name: Edwin
- Fate: Wrecked, June 1816

General characteristics
- Type: Schooner
- Tons burthen: 15 (bm)
- Crew: 3

Edwin was a ship that was wrecked near Cape Hawke, New South Wales, Australia in late June 1816.

Edwin was a schooner of 15 tons and owned by John Palmer in Sydney. It was under the command of Captain R. Matthews when it sailed from Sydney for the Hawkesbury on 10 June 1816. A violent gale blew the ship off course, destroyed the ships rigging and sails and drove it into a huge surf eighty miles North of Port Stephens. Here it was driven ashore near Cape Hawke, in late June or early July 1816. Matthews with his wife, young child and two crew made it to shore but the local aborigines took their clothes and provisions. Forced to live on shellfish and grass they walked southwards towards Newcastle getting to within fifteen miles before Mrs Matthews and the child collapsed from exhaustion. The others made Newcastle and sent out a rescue party who brought in the two exhausted people.
