= Alexander Ewing (soldier) =

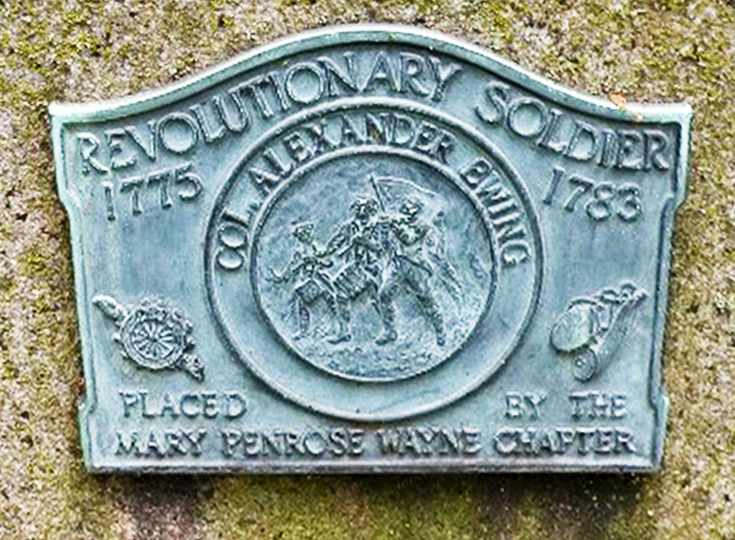
- Gravestone placard
- Born: May 28, 1768; Ashford, Connecticut
- Died: January 1, 1827 (aged 58); Fort Wayne, Indiana
- Resting place: Lindenwood Cemetery
- Occupations: Soldier, merchant, official
- Height: 6 ft 0 in (1.83 m)
- Spouse: Charolette Griffith
- Children: Sophia C. Ewing Noel b. 1796; Charles W. Ewing b. 1798; William G. Ewing b. 1801; Alexander H. Ewing b. 1803; George W. Ewing b. 1804; Louisa Ewing Sturgis b. 1819
- Parents: Alexander Ewing II b. 1732; Lydia Howe b. 1736

Alexander Ewing (May 28, 1768 – January 1, 1827) was a soldier for the Continental Army during the American Revolutionary War and a colonel in the War of 1812. He later was a founding resident of Fort Wayne, Indiana.

== Biography ==
Alexander Ewing was born in Connecticut in 1768 and most likely grew up in Northumberland County, Pennsylvania; his ancestors are believed to have descended from Clan Ewing. Ewing enlisted as a private in the First Company, Fourth Battalion of the Cumberland County Militia, serving from 10 August 1780 until the end of the war. After the war Ewing joined a trading expedition, eventually setting up a trading post in a remote wilderness that would later become Buffalo, New York. After losing his farm to debt, Ewing moved new wife Charolette and his young family to join his brothers Samuel and William in the River Raisin in Frenchtown, Michigan Territory (present-day Monroe, Michigan). The family later moved to Piqua, Ohio.

In the War of 1812 Ewing became a colonel in the Miami County militia which joined General Harrison in his relief expedition to Fort Wayne in 1812. Colonel Ewing served with the army in a detachment of spies under his brother-in-law, Captain William Griffith, who was a survivor of the Ford Dearborn Massacre. In the aftermath of the Battle of the Thames, Ewing helped to identify Tecumseh's body, whom he knew well from his days as a trader. In the spring of 1822 Ewing moved his family to Fort Wayne, Indiana, and built the city's first tavern, later known as Washington Hall, at the corner of Barr and Columbia streets. It was here that Allen County was formed in 1824. Ewing's sons would later flourish financially by establishing one of the West's largest fur trading operations.

In 1838, Ewing's brother, William, the first man to be admitted to the Allen County bar, built the Ewing Homestead at the northwest corner of Berry Street. Although no longer standing, it was considered to be a leading example of Greek Revival architecture in the area.
