= Wang Jialing =

Chinese phonologist

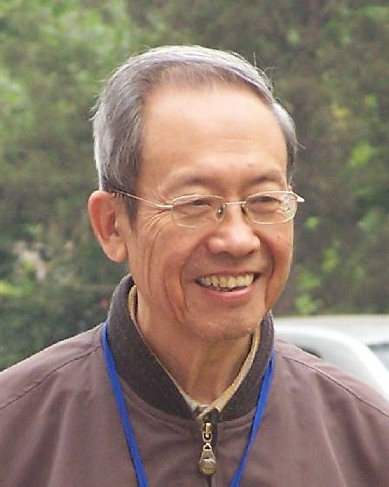
- Jialing Wang (1934-2008)
- Education: Nankai University

Wang Jialing (simplified Chinese: 王嘉龄; traditional Chinese: 王嘉齡; pinyin: Wáng Jiālíng; November 28, 1934 – June 23, 2008) was a Chinese theoretical linguist specializing in phonology.

== Education ==
Wang graduated from the Department of Foreign Languages at Nankai University in 1954.

== Career ==
He started his career teaching at Tianjin #28 Middle School from 1954-1960. In 1960. Wand then joined the English Department (later Foreign Languages College) of Tianjin Normal University.

In the early 1980s, when in his fifties, Wang started his interest in theoretical linguistics and particularly generative phonology. In the following 20 years, he devoted himself to the introduction of phonological theories in Mainland China. He served as the editor of many major linguistics journals in Mainland China and he co-edited with Norval Smith the book Studies in Chinese Phonology (Mouton de Gruyter 1997).

Wang's research applied phonological theories to the analysis of Chinese phonological phenomena. His main research was in phonology with a special focus on "neutral tone", i.e. syllables without or losing lexical tone. At the time of his death, he was near the completion of his project on the analysis of neutral tones across Chinese dialects (National Social Science Foundation of China).

== Books ==
- Wang, Jialing & Norval S.H. Smith (eds.) (1997) Studies in Chinese Phonology. Berlin/New York: Mouton de Gruyter.
- Lu, Jilun & Jialing Wang (eds.) (2003) Studies in Modern Phonetics and Phonology. Tianjin Shehui Kexue Yuan Press [Tianjin Social Sciences Academy Press]. (In Chinese)
- Lu, Jilun & Jialing Wang (eds.) (2012) An Optimality Analysis of Neutral Tone in Chinese Dialects. Tianjin: Tianjin University Press.

== Selected publications ==
- Wang, Jialing (1997) The representation of the neutral tone in Chinese Putonghua. In Wang, Jialing & Norval S.H. Smith (eds.) (1997) Studies in Chinese Phonology. Berlin/New York: Mouton de Gruyter. 157-184.
- Wang, Jialing (2002a) An OT analysis of neutral tone in three Chinese dialects. Yuyan Kexue [Linguistic Sciences] 1.1:78–85. (In Chinese)
- Wang, Jialing (2002b) OT and the Tone Sandhi and tone neutralization in Tianjin Dialect. Zhongguo Yuwen [Studies of the Chinese Language] 4.289:363–371. (In Chinese)
