= Lingua (journal) =

- Discipline: General linguistics
- Language: English
- Edited by: Lise Fontaine

Publication details
- History: 1949–present
- Publisher: Elsevier
- Frequency: 16/year
- Open access: Hybrid
- Impact factor: 1.6 (2025)

Standard abbreviations
- ISO 4: Lingua

Indexing
- ISSN: 0024-3841
- LCCN: 52036290
- OCLC no.: 1755938

Links
- Journal homepage; Online archive

Lingua: An International Review of General Linguistics is a peer-reviewed academic journal covering general linguistics that was established in 1949. It is published by Elsevier and the editor-in-chief is Lise Fontaine (University of Quebec).

== History ==
In October 2015 the editors and editorial board resigned en masse to protest their inability to come to an agreement with Elsevier regarding fair pricing models for open access publishing. They subsequently started a new journal, Glossa since Elsevier refused to relinquish the rights on the name Lingua.

Elsevier has continued Lingua under new leadership. Within the linguistics community, some consider Glossa as having inherited the reputation of the earlier journal. Elsevier's continuation is referred to (by some linguists) as Zombie Lingua and is regarded as a new journal. Following a statement from their linguistics faculties, the University of California Libraries requested that Elsevier cancel their subscription to post-2015 volumes of Lingua. In a joint post on Language Log in 2016, Eric Baković and Kai von Fintel noted lower quality standards at the new Lingua which included a paper withdrawn due to plagiarism.

== Abstracting and indexing ==
The journal is abstracted and indexed in:

- Arts and Humanities Citation Index
- Current Contents/Arts & Humanities
- EBSCO databases
- FRANCIS
- International Bibliography of Periodical Literature
- L'Année philologique
- Linguistic Bibliography
- Linguistics & Language Behavior Abstracts
- Modern Language Association Database
- Scopus
- Social Sciences Citation Index

According to the Journal Citation Reports, the journal has a 2025 impact factor of 1.6.
