= Phonology (journal) =

- Discipline: Phonology
- Language: English
- Edited by: Colin J. Ewen; Ellen Kaisse; Daniel Currie Hall; Yoonjung Kang

Publication details
- History: 1984–present
- Publisher: Cambridge University Press (United Kingdom)
- Frequency: Triannual
- Impact factor: 1.08 (2012)

Standard abbreviations
- ISO 4: Phonology

Indexing
- ISSN: 0952-6757 (print); 1469-8188 (web)

Links
- Journal homepage

Phonology is a British peer-reviewed journal of phonology published by Cambridge University Press devoted exclusively to this subfield of linguistics. The current editors are Colin J. Ewen (Leiden University), Ellen Kaisse (University of Washington), Daniel Currie Hall (Saint Mary's University) and Yoonjung Kang (University of Toronto). The volumes from 1997 on are available electronically with subscription via the site of the publisher.

Now published three times a year, in its first three years (1984–1987) it appeared once a year under the name Phonology Yearbook.

== Most cited articles ==
As of January 2011, the top 5 most cited articles were (The years indicate "online publication"; so Clements 2008 is, for example, actually Clements 1985, when it was first published in paper format):

1. Clements, G. N. (2008). "The geometry of phonological features". Phonology. 2: 225–252. doi:10.1017/S0952675700000440.
2. Kiparsky, P. (2008). "Some consequences of Lexical Phonology". Phonology. 2: 85–138. doi:10.1017/S0952675700000397.
3. Archangeli, D. (2008). "Aspects of underspecification theory". Phonology. 5 (2): 183–207. doi:10.1017/S0952675700002268.
4. Kaye, J.; Lowenstamm, J.; Vergnaud, J. R. (2008). "The internal structure of phonological elements: a theory of charm and government". Phonology. 2: 305–328. doi:10.1017/S0952675700000476.
5. Browman, C. P.; Goldstein, L. (2008). "Articulatory gestures as phonological units". Phonology. 6 (2): 201–251. doi:10.1017/S0952675700001019.
