= Eoin =

Eóin (pronounced [oːnʲ]) is a masculine Irish-language given name. The Scottish Gaelic equivalent is Eòin (pronounced [jɔːɲ]) and both are closely related to the Welsh Ioan. It is also cognate with the Irish Seán and English John. In the Irish language, it is the name used for all Biblical figures known as John in English, including John the Baptist and John the Apostle.

Eóin and Eòin are different names from Eoghan/Eòghan. The Old Irish name Eógan is generally considered to be a derivation of the Greek and Latin name Eugenes, meaning "noble born".

== Political figures ==
- Eoin an Ile or John of Islay, Earl of Ross (15th century)
- Eoin Mac Neill (1867–1945), Irish nationalist politician and scholar
- Eoin Ó Broin (born 1972), Irish Sinn Féin politician
- Eoin O'Duffy (1890–1944), Irish revolutionary, leader of the Blueshirts
- Eóin Tennyson (born 1998), Northern Irish politician

== Artists ==
- Eoin Colfer, Irish author of the Artemis Fowl series
- Eoin McNamee, Irish author
- Eoin O'Broin, Irish DJ and producer under the stage name Noisestorm
- Eoin O'Keeffe, Irish composer
- Eoin Scolard, Irish author
- Marcus Eoin Sandison, Scottish musician of the duo Boards of Canada
- Eoin McCarthy, Irish actor
- Eoin Macken, Irish actor

== Sportsmen ==
=== Gaelic Athletic Association ===
==== Gaelic footballers ====
- Eoin Bradley, a Derry player
- Eoin Brosnan, a three-time All Ireland winning Kerry player
- Eoin Cotter, a Cork player
- Eoin Donnelly, a Fermanagh player
- Eoin Liston, a Kerry Gaelic football legend
- Eoin McHugh (born 1994/5), a Donegal player

==== Hurlers ====
- Eoin Cadogan, a Cork hurler and footballer
- Eoin Kelly (Tipperary hurler), an All-Ireland winning Tipperary player
- Eoin Kelly (Waterford hurler), a three-time Munster Championship winning Waterford player
- Eoin Larkin, a seven-time All-Ireland winning Kilkenny hurler
- Eoin McGrath, a three-time Munster championship winning Waterford hurler
- Eoin Murphy, a three-time Munster Championship winning Waterford hurler
- Eoin Quigley, a Wexford hurler and former Bohemians soccer player

=== Soccer players ===
- Eoin Doyle, a Cardiff City player
- Eoin Hand, soccer analyst and former manager of the Irish Soccer Team
- Eoin Jess, a former Scottish international and Aberdeen player
- Eoin Reid, a Celtic reserves player
- Eoin Mullen, a Bohemian FC player

=== Other ===
- Eoin Collins, a former Irish tennis player
- Eoin Kennedy, an All-Ireland winning handballer
- Eoin Morgan, an Irish cricketer who now represents England
- Eoin Murray, an Irish British Touring Car Championship driver
- Eoin Reddan, an Irish Rugby international
- Eoin Reilly, a junior champion sculler and rower from New Zealand
- Eoin Rheinisch, an Irish canoeist
- Eoin Ó Siochrú, an Irish motorcyclist

== Others ==
- Eoin Cameron, an Australian radio personality
- Eoin B. B. Kennelly, an Irish serial killer
- Eóin Mac Suibhne, fourteenth-century Scottish nobleman
- Eoin McKiernan, an academic in the field of Irish Studies
- Eoin McLove, a fictional character in the sitcom Father Ted
- Eóin Doyle, fictional character from "the JFKs" song of the same name.
- Eoin McGonigal, founding member of the British SAS

== See also ==
- Alternate forms for the name John
- Eoghan
- Eugene (given name)
- Iain
- List of Irish-language given names
- Owen (name)
