= William Howell Ewin =

William Howell Ewin (c. 1731 – 1804) was a usurer. He was the son of Thomas Ewin, formerly a grocer, and latterly a brewer in partnership with one Sparks of St. Sepulchre's, Cambridge, by a daughter of a coal merchant named Howell of St. Clement's in the same town.

== Education and early career ==
He was educated at St John's College, Cambridge, taking the degrees of B.A. 1753, M.A. 1756, and LL.D. 11 June 1766. He is said to have received a diploma of LL.D. from the University of Edinburgh in or about 1778, but his name does not occur in the Catalogue of Graduates, 1858. On the death of his father he inherited his share of the brewing business and a handsome fortune, which he largely increased by private usury.

He was placed on the Commission of the Peace for the town and county of Cambridge. In 1769 he joined his old college tutor, Dr. William Samuel Powell, in opposing the act for better paving, lighting, and watching the town, by which the design was hindered for a time. William Cole wrote:

"Being much of his father's turn, busy and meddling in other people's concerns, got the ill will of most persons in the town and university. …The gownsmen bore him a particular grudge for interfering much in their affairs. … They often broke the doctor's windows, as they said he had been caught listening on their staircases and doors. … Dr. Ewin, as did his father, squinted very much, hence his nickname of "Dr. Squintum"

== The "usurious affair" ==
In January 1777 a report was current at Cambridge that he had been detected in lending money at an enormous interest in 1775 and 1776 to a scholar of Trinity College named William Bird, then a minor, and without a father, whom he had also caused to be imprisoned in a sponging-house. The sum advanced was £750, for which he took notes to the amount of £1,090. This "usurious affair", as Cole terms it, came to light at a very unlucky time, for he had been promised the chancellorship of the Diocese of Ely, which fell vacant in the following May. Eighteen months, however, were allowed to elapse before the university took action. The trial came on in the Vice-Chancellor's court 14 October 1778, when Ewin made but a sorry defence. On 21 October, he was sentenced to be suspended from all degrees taken, or to be taken, and expelled from the university. The delegates on his appeal confirmed the suspension, but revoked the expulsion. He thereupon applied to the court of king's bench for a mandamus to restore him to his degrees. The court after full argument awarded the writ in June 1779, on the ground that there being no express statute of the university forbidding usury or the lending of money to minors, the Vice-Chancellor's court had no jurisdiction in the case. Lord Mansfield, however, censured Ewin's conduct in the strongest terms, stigmatised him as "a corrupter of youth and an usurer", and suggested that a statute to meet such cases in future should be passed, and that he might be struck out of the Commission of the Peace. On 20 October 1779 he was restored to his degree of LL.D., but was put out of the county commission in 1781.

== Later career ==
Eventually he fixed himself at Brentford, Middlesex, where "his strict attention to the administration of parochial concerns, quick to discern and severe to condemn every species of idleness and imposition, created him many enemies, particularly among the lower orders of people" (Gent. Mag. vol. lxxiv. pt. ii. p. 1174). He died at Brentford Butts on 29 Dec. 1804, aged 73, and was buried in the chapel of New Brentford, where a monument by Flaxman records his many virtues (Lysons, Environs of London, Supplement, p. 103). He was supposed to have left property amounting to over £100,000.

== Portraits ==
No portrait of Ewin is known to be extant, but there is a print dated 1773 representing Mr. Stanley, grandson of the Earl of Derby, spitting in his face, for which affront the doctor prosecuted him. He was the subject of many effusions of undergraduate hate in both Latin and English, some of which were printed and hawked by ballad mongers about the town. Two are given by Cole.
