= Ewan (surname) =

Ewan is a surname. Notable people with the surname include:

- Caleb Ewan (born 1994), Australian cyclist
- Chris Ewan (born 1976), British writer
- Gregor Ewan (born 1971), Scottish wheelchair curler
- Joseph Ewan (1909–1999), American botanist, naturalist, and historian of science
