= Edwin (surname) =

Edwin is a surname. Notable people with the surname include:

- Sir Humphrey Edwin (1642–1707), English merchant and Lord Mayor of London
- Charles Edwin (died 1756), Welsh politician, MP for Westminster 1741–47, for Glamorgan 1747–56
- Charles Edwin (died 1801), Welsh politician, MP for Glamorgan 1780–89
- Samuel Edwin (1671–1722), British politician, MP for Minehead 1717
