= Marc van Oostendorp =

Dutch linguist and Esperantist, professor at Radboud University

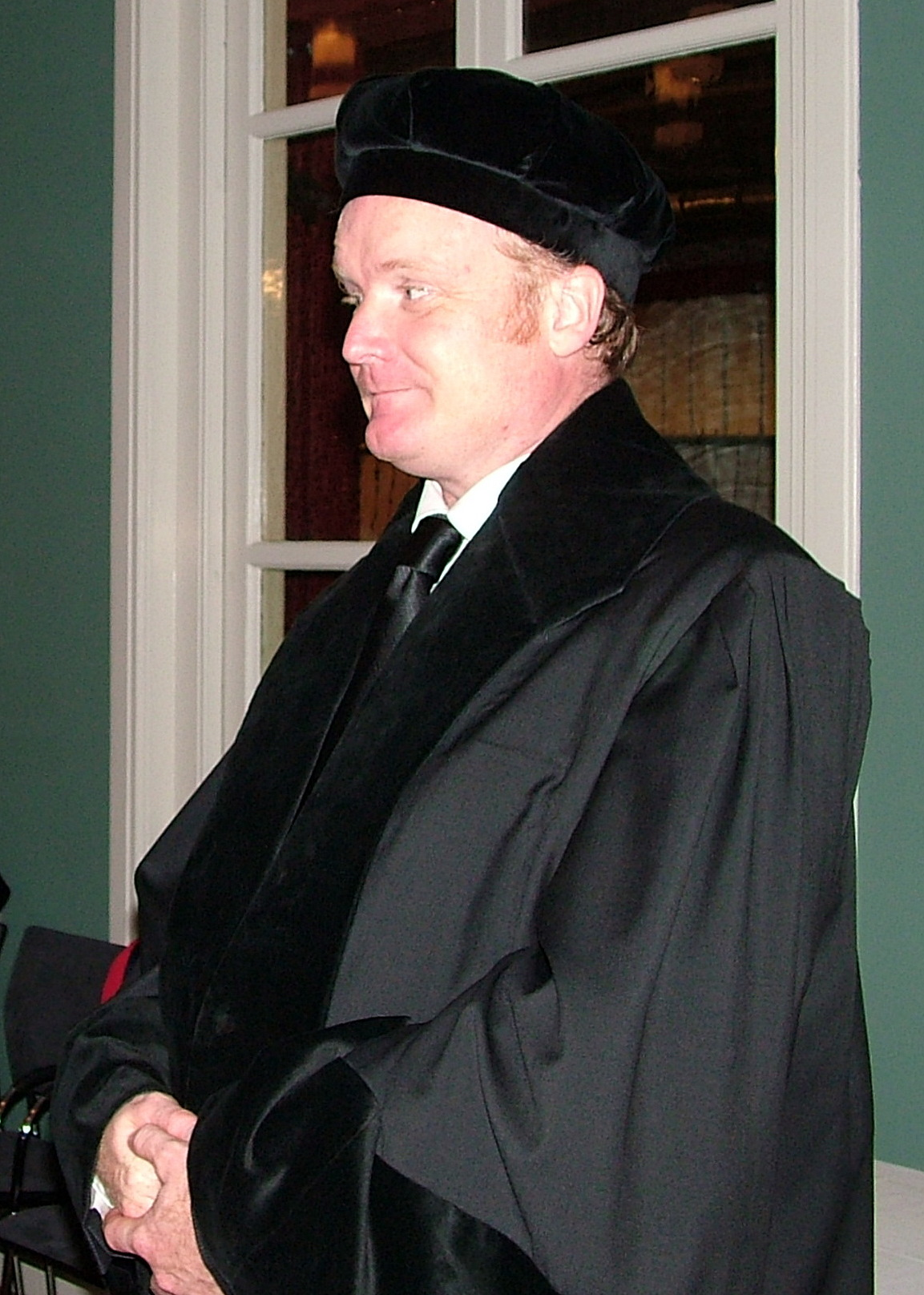
Marc van Oostendorp is introduced at the Academiegebouw, 2008

Marc van Oostendorp (Dutch pronunciation: [ˈmɑr(ə)k fɑn ˈoːstə(n)dɔr(ə)p]; (Note: Van in isolation: [vɑn].) born 15 December 1967 in Rotterdam) is a Dutch linguist and Esperantist. From 2004 he has served as a weekly commentator on linguistics for Radio Noord-Holland. Since 2007, he has researched phonological microvariation, dialectology and interlinguistics. He is currently attached to the Radboud University in Nijmegen.

In Flanders and the Netherlands, van Oostendorp is known as a contributor to Genootschap Onze Taal ("Society for our language"). He collaborates with Belgian copywriter Erik Dams to produce Taalpost, a thrice-weekly e-mailed newsletter on the topic of language in general and Dutch in particular.

== Brief biography ==
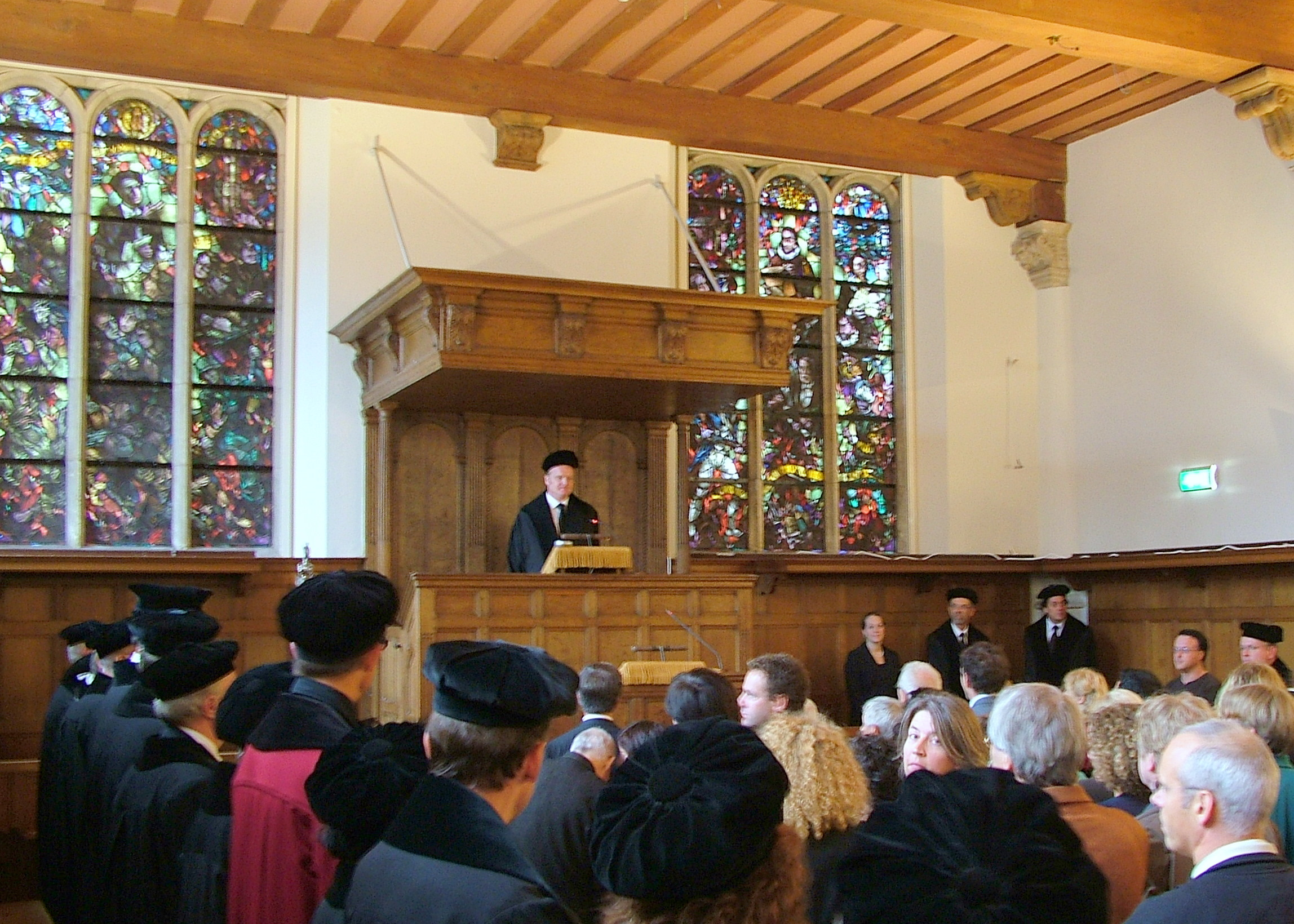
Inaugural speech of Marc van Oostendorp at the Leiden University in 2008

Oostendorp received his BA in Dutch literature and linguistics from Leiden University in 1987. From Tilburg University he earned both his master's degree in computational and general linguistics (1991) and his doctorate in linguistics (1995).

In 1995, on the Project Gutenberg model, he founded Project Laurens Janszoon Coster, a free library of electronic editions of classical Dutch literature. To help disseminate linguistic knowledge, among other things, in 1996 he compiled a guide to help people create their own home pages on the Internet.

From September 1997 to January 2001 he was associate professor of interlinguistics and Esperanto at the University of Amsterdam. It so happens that his birthday (15 December) is the same as that of Esperanto creator L. L. Zamenhof. Since 1999 he has been a senior researcher for the Meertens Institute, a group concerned with research and documentation into Dutch language and culture. He also held visiting lectureships at universities in Essex; Toronto; Amherst, Massachusetts; Tromsø, Trondheim, Verona and Barcelona.

== Selected works ==
- 2011: The Blackwell Companion to Phonology. Ed. by Marc van Oostendorp [et al.]. 5 vols. Malden, MA, Wiley-Blackwell. ISBN 978-1-4051-8423-6
- 2005: The Internal Organization of Phonological Segments. Ed. by Marc van Oostendorp and Jeroen van de Weijer. Berlin, Mouton De Gruyter. ISBN 3-11-018295-5
- 2000: Phonological Projection. A Theory of Feature Content and Prosodic Structure Berlin, Mouton De Gruyter, 396 pages. ISBN 9783110154221
