= Ewing (given name) =

Ewing, as a given name, may refer to:

- Ewing Y. Freeland (1887–1953), American football and baseball player and college coach of football, basketball and baseball
- Ewing Galloway (1880–1953), American journalist and photography agency owner
- Ewing Kauffman (1916–1993), American pharmaceutical entrepreneur, philanthropist and Major League Baseball team owner
- Ewing Mitchell (1910–1988), American actor
- Ewing Young (1799–1841), American fur trapper and trader

== See also ==
- R. Ewing Thomason (1879–1973), American politician
