= Clan MacEwen =

Scottish clan

- MacEòghainn (Son of Ewen)
- Motto: Reviresco (I grow strong again)

Profile
- District: Cowal, Galloway, Lennox and Perthshire
- Clan MacEwen no longer has a chief, and is an armigerous clan
- Last Chief: Swene MacEwen
- Died: 1493

Clan MacEwen or Clan MacEwan is a Scottish clan recorded in the fifteenth century as Clan Ewen of Otter.

Historically, there have been several different MacEwen clans and septs, with some distinct, and some interrelated, origins for the modern surname. Each of these historical clans could be described by the name, "Clan MacEwen" or, at times, "Clan Ewen". Since the death of Swene MacEwen in 1493, the clan has not had a chief recognized by either the members, or the Lord Lyon King of Arms, and as such Clan MacEwen is considered an Armigerous clan.

As of 2020, members of Clan MacEwen Society, UK have agreed to elect a Commander, Sir John Roderick Hugh McEwen, 5th Baronet (born 1965), of Marchmont and Bardrochat, who is proposed as the first Chief to potentially be recognized by the Lord Lyon since the death of Swene MacEwen. The McEwen Baronet title was created in 1953 by Queen Elizabeth II for his father, Conservative politician Sir John McEwen, 1st Baronet. Historically, these McEwens held lands in Bardrochat in Carrick. These modern McEwen Baronets may not have any historical connection with Clan MacEwen of Otter.

There are also other clan societies organized under the Ewen, Ewing, and MacEwan names.

== Historical MacEwen Clans and Septs ==
The name "MacEwen" comes from one of the many anglicised spellings of the Scottish Gaelic name, MacEòghainn, which means, "son of Eòghann", and could have arisen independently at different times throughout history. There are dozens of spelling variations of the original MacEòghainn name that have been recorded. Several possible clans and septs have likely taken their surname from men named Eòghann. The origins below can be found in Scotland, while others can be found in Ireland.

Clan Ewen of Otter

The MacEwen lords of Otter appear sporadically in fourteenth- and fifteenth-century records. The genealogy of the clan is recorded in MS 1467, now held by the National Library of Scotland. The last MacEwen of Otter was Swene MacEwen, on whose death in 1493 the barony passed into Campbell overlordship.

MacEwens in Galloway

There have been MacEwens in Galloway since 1331 (apparently before the first MacEwens of Otter), when one Patrick McEwyn was Provost of Wigtown. According to tradition, these McEwens fought alongside the Sheriff of Wigtown's clan, the Agnews of Lochnaw, against the Black Douglas in a feud over the Sheriffdom of Galloway in the middle of the fifteenth century.

MacEwens of MacDougall

Many MacEwens still preserve a tradition of descent from Clan MacDougall, and a MacEwen sept has been acknowledged by the MacDougall chiefs. In particular, it is known that MacEwan of Muckley (the first armiger with the MacEwen name) was descended from Ewen Mor MacDougall, brother of the MacDougall of Lorne. MacEwens in the area of Perthshire and Loch Tay were therefore considered to be a part of Clan MacDougall.

MacEwens of Clan Cameron

During the sixteenth century, a group of Camerons were also known as 'Clan Ewyne'. The leader of this clan was Donald Mac Ewen Vic Ewen Cameron of Erracht who was killed in 1570, and his followers took the MacEwen name. The Gaelic name for this sept is Sliochd Eoghain 'ic Eoghain. MacEwens who took part in the Moyness Raid of 1598 were members of this clan.

MacEwan bardic family

The MacEwan bardic family was a prominent learned kindred that practiced classical Gaelic poetry, recognized as one of the "families of the filidh." The family served the MacDougalls of Lorne, and later the Campbells of Argyll. The MacEwans, like other prominent bardic families employed by Scottish lords, were likely of Irish origin. Their use of the rare personal name Athairne suggests that they were a branch of the Irish O'Hosey (Ó hEoghusa) bardic family. A branch of the MacEwan bardic family may have been the MacEwan family of harpers, recorded in the mid-sixteenth century.

== Dubious historical traditions ==
It is frequently stated that an Act of Parliament of 1602 lists MacEwens beside MacLachlans and McNeils, as vassals of the Earl of Argyll and answerable to him for their behaviour.

Highland lore among Clan MacLachlan is that after Sween MacEwen's death, Clan MacLachlan offered to serve in the role as protectorate to their MacEwen cousins, as the two clans have historically been allies and relatives. In this spirit, Clan Maclachlan traditionally extends membership to MacEwens.

According to the 19th-century historian James Logan, in General Wade's statement of the Highland forces engaged in the Jacobite rising of 1715, the MacEwens of the Isle of Skye were recorded to have summoned 150 men.

The McEwen baronets

The McEwen Baronet title was created by Elizabeth II on 28 January 1953 for the Conservative politician John McEwen, who served as Under-Secretary of State for Scotland from 1939 to 1940. Historically, these McEwens held lands in Bardrochat in Carrick. These modern McEwen Baronets may not have any historical connection with Clan MacEwen of Otter. It is from this line that Sir John Roderick Hugh McEwen, 5th Baronet (born 1965), who has been nominated as Commander by the UK clan society, descends.

== Modern clan symbolism ==
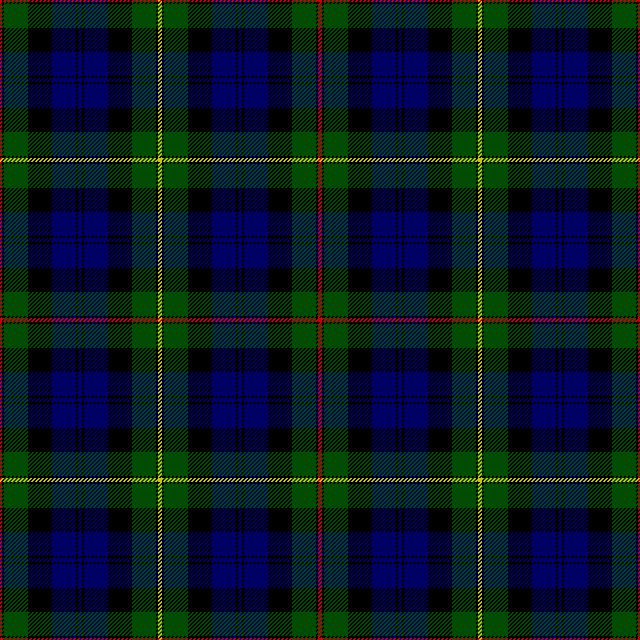
The MacEwen tartan is very similar to the tartans of the Campbells.

Crest badge

Many clansfolk today wear a crest badge to show allegiance to their particular clan. Crest badges usually consist of strap-and-buckle surrounding the clan chief's heraldic crest, with the chief's motto written within the strap. Since the clan revival of the early nineteenth century, many MacEwens have adopted the crest of a large oak stump, clearly the base of what was once a large oak tree, that despite having been cut down is now sprouting new branches. The banner accompanying the image bears the Latin motto REVIRESCO ("I grow green / verdant / strong again"). This crest badge is not derived from the arms of a previous chief of the clan, but appears to have been in use among the Galloway McEwens from an early date. This crest and motto are recorded in the Arms of the McEwen Baronets (McEwen of Marchmont and Bardrochat). These McEwens held lands in Bardrochat in Carrick. The McEwen Baronets may not have any connection with Clan MacEwen of Otter.

Tartan

MacEwen tartan closely resembles Farquharson and MacLeod of Harris. The sett is similar to Campbell of Loudon tartan except that a red stripe is substituted for white. MacEwen tartan also strongly resembles the Clan Colquhoun tartan except that the Colquhoun tartan has all red stripes instead of the yellow McEwen stripe and Colqhoun plaid has white border stripes around the blue and green squares.

== Current moves to appoint a chief ==
On 27 February 2012, the Lord Lyon announced his intention to appoint a Supervising Officer to oversee a future Family Convention or Derbhfine "for those of the [MacEwen] name, broadly defined . . . with a view to the recognition of a Commander." On 11 October 2012, the Lord Lyon announced the appointment of the Honourable Adam Bruce, Marchmont Herald of Arms, as Supervising Officer for the Family Convention.

As of 2020, members of the Clan MacEwen Society, UK have elected a Commander, Sir John R.H McEwen, 5th Baronet of Marchmont and Bardrochat, who is line to become the first Chief since the death of Swene MacEwen, in 1493. Sir John the 5th inherits his Baronet title from his grandfather, Sir John McEwen, 1st Baronet, for whom the modern McEwen Baronet title was created by the Queen of the United Kingdom in 1953. These modern McEwen Baronets may not have any historical connection with Clan MacEwen of Otter. Clan Ewing has chosen to go their own way and form their own organisation.

== See also ==
- Scottish clan
- Clan Ewen of Otter
