= Clan Ewing =

Scottish clan

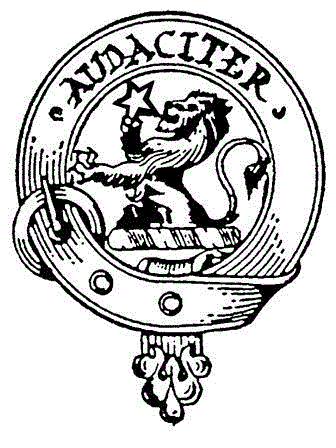
- Motto: AUDACITER

Profile
- Region: Scottish Highlands
- District: Cowal, Dunbartonshire, Stirling

Chief
- John Thor Ewing
Allied clans
Clan Lamont
Clan MacLachlan
Clan MacSween
Clan Campbell

Clan Ewing is a Highland clan which was historically based both in Dunbartonshire & Stirlingshire in the Lennox, and also in Cowal in Argyll, and which claims descent from Clan Ewen of Otter. In 2024 John Thor Ewing was invited by Lord Lyon King of Arms to petition undifferenced Arms of the Chief of the Name of Ewing.

== See also ==
- Scottish clan
- Clan MacEwen
