= Iwan (name) =

- Pronunciation: /ˈjuːən/ Welsh pronunciation: [ˈi.wan]
- Gender: Male

Origin
- Origin: Welsh; Slavic languages; Iranic languages
- Meaning: God is gracious.

Other names
- Related names: Euan, Ewen, Eoghan; Ivan, John

Iwan is a masculine given name and a surname.

It is a Welsh and Cornish name related to Ifan and derived from the Latin Johannes, which means, "God is gracious". There are numerous other Welsh/Cornish derivatives of Johannes, including Ioan, Ieuan, Iefan (or Ievan), Ifan, Evan and Sion.

It is also found in Germanic and Slavic languages as a variant of Ivan (name), which has a common origin.

== People (given name) ==
- Iwan (musician) (born 1985), Ghanaian reggae and dance hall performer
- Iwan (singer) (born 1980), Lebanese singer
- Iwan Arnold (born 1991), Swiss ski mountaineer
- Iwan Baan, Dutch architectural photographer
- Iwan Babij, Ukrainian educator and activist
- Iwan Bloch, Berlin dermatologist, sexologist and Marquis de Sade scientist
- Iwan Edwards, Canadian choral conductor
- Iwan Fals, Indonesian singer, commercial star, and songwriter
- Iwan Gilkin, Belgian poet
- Iwan Griffiths, Welsh drummer
- Iwan Gronow, British bass guitarist
- Iwan Iwanoff, Bulgarian architect
- Gwilliam Iwan Jones, Welsh photographer and anthropologist
- Iwan Knorr, German teacher of music
- Iwan Müller, Estonian-born German clarinetist
- Iwan Pylypow, the first Ukrainian immigrant to Canada
- Iwan Redan, Dutch footballer
- Iwan Rheon, Welsh actor
- Iwan "Iwcs" Roberts, Welsh actor, lyricist and singer
- Iwan Roberts, Welsh footballer
- Iwan Serrurier, Dutch-born electrical engineer, inventor of Moviola
- Iwan Thomas, Welsh athlete
- Iwan Tirta, Indonesian batik fashion designer
- Iwan Tukalo, Scottish rugby union footballer
- Iwan Tyszkiewicz, Socinian Unitarian executed for blasphemy and heresy by the Polish-Lithuanian Commonwealth
- Iwan Wirth, Swiss contemporary art dealer and gallery owner

== People (surname) ==
- Andrzej Iwan (1959–2022), retired Polish football player
- Bartosz Iwan (born 1984), Polish footballer, son of Andrzej Iwan
- Bret Iwan (born 1982), American illustrator and voice artist
- Dafydd Iwan (born 1943), Welsh folk singer and politician
- Emrys ap Iwan (1848–1906), Welsh literary critic and writer on politics and religion
- Llion Iwan, Welsh journalist, documentary producer, and author
- Tomasz Iwan (born 1971), retired Polish football player
- Wilhelm Iwan (1871–1958), German author, historian, and theologian
