= Ifan =

Ifan may refer to:

== People ==
- Ifan (given name), list of people with this name
- Jacob Ifan (born 1993), Welsh actor
- Tecwyn Ifan (born 1952), Welsh singer and songwriter
- Wil Ifan, Welsh poet
- Ifan Nanda Pratama, Indonesian footballer
- The nickname of Riefian Fajarsyah of a former Seventeen member, disbanded by 2018 Sunda Strait tsunami.

== Places ==
- Betws Ifan, a small village located in Ceredigion, Wales
- Cadair Ifan Goch, a crag in North Wales
- Ifan, Nigeria, a city in southern Nigeria
- Pentre Ifan, an ancient manor in Nevern, North Pembrokeshire, West Wales
- Ysbyty Ifan, a small but historic village in Conwy, north Wales

== Other ==
- IFAN Museum of African Arts in Dakar, Senegal is one of the oldest art museums in West Africa
- The Institut Fondamental d'Afrique Noire, academic centers in Francophone West Africa
- Independent Food Aid Network, UK network of independent food aid providers
