= John (given name) =

Given name

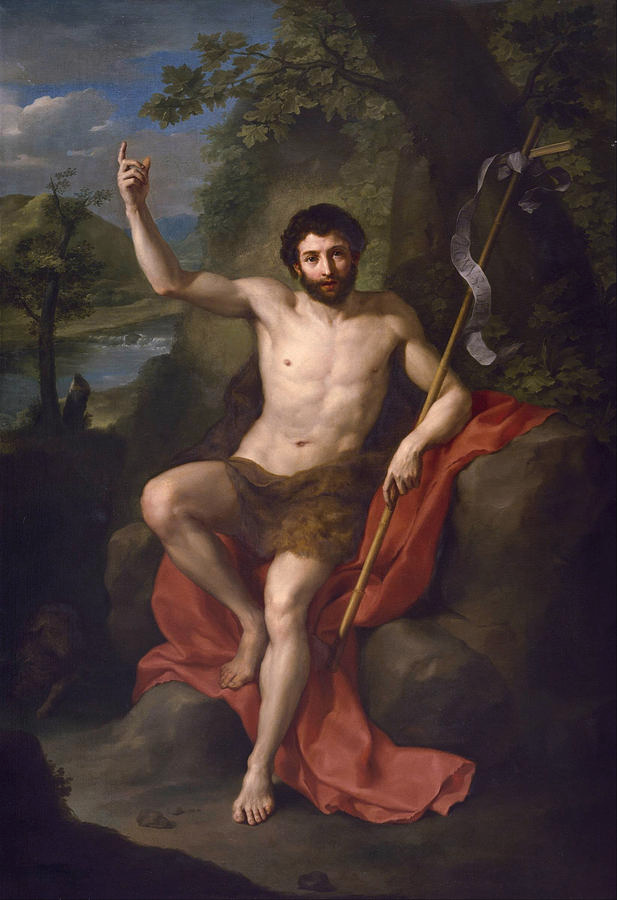
- 18th-century painting of John the Baptist by Anton Raphael Mengs
- Pronunciation: /ˈdʒɒn/ JON
- Gender: Male
- Language: English
- Name day: June 24

Origin
- Origin: Hebrew
- Meaning: "God has been gracious", "Graced by God" (Johanan)

Other names
- Nicknames: Johnny, Jack, Jackie, Johnnie
- Derived: יוֹחָנָן (Yôḥānān)
- Related names: Eoin; Euan; Evan; Evandro; Evaristo; Ewan; Giannis; Giovanni; Hanan; Hans; Hone; Hovhannes; Ian; Iban; Ieuan; Ifan; Ioan; Ioane; Ioannis; Ivan; Iven; Jaan; Jack; Jackson; Jahan; Jan; Jane; Janet; Janez; János; Jean; Jens; Jhon; Joan; João; Johan/Johann; Johanan; Johannes; Johnny; Jon; Jone; Jonne; Jonni; Jovan; Juan; Juha; Juhani; Sean; Shane; Sheena; Siân; Sinéad; Siobhan; Sion; Sioned; Xoán; Yahya; Yannis; Yo-han; Yohannes
- Popularity: see popular names

John (/dʒɒn/ JON) is a very common given male name in the English language, ultimately of Hebrew origin. Traditionally in the Anglosphere, it was the most common, although it has not been since the latter half of the 20th century. The name is among the most commonly given names in the Anglophone, Arabic, European, Latin American, Iranian, and Turkic countries. The numerous forms of the name in various languages were formerly often simply translated as "John" in English but are increasingly left in their native forms (see sidebar).

John is popular due to it being two saints names, John the Baptist and the apostle John (believed to be the author of the Gospel of John); The name has been chosen as the regnal or religious name of several emperors, kings, popes and patriarchs. It was a favorite name among the Greeks and increased in use across Europe after the First Crusade.

The name Jonathan, sometimes shortened to Jon, derives from a different Biblical name Yonatan ( "given by God") and is not etymologically related to the name John.

== Origins ==
John, a name of Hebrew origin, is very popular in the Western World, and has given many variants depending on the language: Shaun, Eoin, Ian, Juan, Ivan, and Yahya. Click on the image to see the diagram in full detail.

The name John is a theophoric name originating from the Hebrew name יוֹחָנָן (Yôḥānān), or in its longer form יְהוֹחָנָן (Yəhôḥānān), meaning "God has been gracious". Several obscure figures in the Old Testament bore this name, and it grew in popularity once borne by the high priest Johanan (fl. 407 BC) and especially by King John Hyrcanus (d. 104 BC). In the Second Temple period, it was the fifth most popular male name among Jews in Judaea and was borne by several important rabbis, such as Yochanan ben Zakai and Yochanan ben Nuri.

In Medieval Latin, the name Johannes was an altered form of the Late Latin Ioannes, itself taken from the Greek name Ioannis (Ιωάννης). This name became the Old French Jan, Jean, Jehan (Modern French Jean),, which became Ioon, Ihon, Iohn, Jan in Middle English by the middle of the 12th century. However, the Middle English name may also derive directly from Medieval Latin.

== Name statistics ==
John was the most popular name given to male infants in the United States until 1924, and though its use has fallen off gradually since then, John was still the 20th most common name for boys on the Social Security Administration's list of the names given in 2006.

John was also among the most common masculine names in the United Kingdom, but by 2004 it had fallen out of the top 50 names for newborn boys in England and Wales.

By contrast Jack, which was a nickname for John but is now established as a name in its own right, was the most popular name given to newborn boys in England and Wales every year from 1995 to 2005. It is also the third most common name in the United States, with an estimated 3.18 million individuals as of 2021 according to the Social Security Administration.

== Related names ==
The Germanic languages, including German, English and Scandinavian produced the masculine:

- Jack (given name)
- Johann
- Johan (Dutch)
- Joan,
- Jan and Janke (Dutch)
- Jens (Danish and Frisian)
- Jóhannes
- Jóhann (Icelandic and Faroese)
- Jöns (Swedish)
- Hans (German, Dutch and Scandinavian).

Other equivalents include:

- Jaan (Estonian)

There are several female names with the same etymology, including Joan, Joanna, Joanne, Jane, Janet, Janice, Jean, and Jeanne.

== See also ==
- List of people with given name John
- Hanan (given name)
- Johnathan, a portmanteau with the unrelated name Jonathan
