= Ifan (given name) =

- Pronunciation: [ˈiːvan]
- Gender: Male
- Language: Welsh

Origin
- Origin: Hebrew
- Region of origin: Wales

Other names
- Related names: Evan, Ianto, Ieuan, Ioan, Iwan, John, Siôn

Ifan ([ˈiːvan]) is one of several Welsh forms of the male given name Ieuan. Like the English name John, it ultimately derives from the Latin Johannes.

== People named Ifan ==
- Ifan ab Owen Edwards (1895–1970), a Welsh academic, writer and film-maker
- Ifan Evans (born 1983), Welsh rugby union player
- Ifan Phillips (born 1996), Welsh rugby union player
- Ifan Meredith (born 1976), Welsh actor
- Ifan Williams, Sr. (1889–1957), Welsh-born Canadian violinist

== Others ==
- William Evans (Wil Ifan) (1883–1968), a Welsh poet and Archdruid of the National Eisteddfod of Wales

== See also ==
- Ifan (disambiguation)
- Rhys Ifans
- Evan
- Ianto
- Ieuan
- Ioan
- Iwan (name)
- Siôn
