= Ianto =

Ianto may refer to:

- Ianto Davies (1892–1945), Welsh international rugby union full back
- Ianto Evans, Welsh-American applied ecologist, landscape architect, inventor, writer, social critic, and teacher
- Ianto Morgan, a fictional character in the 1939 novel How Green Was My Valley (novel) by Richard Llywellyn
- Ianto Jones, a fictional character in the BBC television series Torchwood
  - Ianto's Shrine, Cardiff, Wales

== See also ==
- Ioan
- Siôn
