= Ieuan =

- Pronunciation: [ˈjəɨan]
- Gender: Male

Origin
- Origin: Welsh
- Meaning: God is gracious

Other names
- Variant forms: Ifan, Ioan, Iwan

Ieuan is a masculine Welsh given name – one of several Welsh names derived from Latin Johannes or Ioannes and, therefore, analogous to the English language name John. Other Welsh names derived from Ioannes/Johannes or John include Ioan, Iwan, Iefan (or Ievan), Ifan, Evan, and Sion.

== People ==
- Saint Ieuan, 6th-century saint; there is a church dedicated to him in Llantrisant, on the Isle of Anglesey.
- Ieuan ab Owain Glyndŵr (c. 1380 – c. 1430), reputed illegitimate son to Owain Glyndŵr, the last native prince of Wales.
- Ieuan ap Hywel Swrdwal (c. 1430 – c. 1480), Welsh poet; first recorded Welshman to write an English poem.
- Ieuan Gethin ap Ieuan ap Lleision (fl. c. 1450), poet from Glamorgan.
- Ieuan Brydydd Hir (fl. 1450 – 1485), poet and singer from Meirionnydd
- Ieuan Dyfi (c. 1461 – c. 1500), Welsh poet
- Ieuan Gwyllt (1822–1877), bardic name of musician and minister John Roberts.
- Ieuan ap Iago (1809–1878), bardic name of Evan James, poet who wrote the lyrics of the national anthem of Wales, the music of which was by his son James James (Iago ap Ieuan).
- Ieuan Williams (1909–64), Welsh cricketer – wicketkeeper for Glamorgan.
- Ieuan Rhys Williams (1909–1973), radio and actor.
- Ieuan Wyn Pritchard Roberts, Baron Roberts of Conwy, PC (1930–2013), Welsh Conservative politician.
- Ieuan Wyn Jones, AM (born 1949), former Deputy First Minister for Wales, and leader of Plaid Cymru.
- Ieuan Rhys (born 1961), television and stage actor.
- Ieuan Evans (born 1964), former rugby union wing for Wales and the Lions; correspondent for Sky Sports
- Ieuan Lloyd (born 1993), professional swimmer.
