= Jone (given name) =

Male given name

- Gender: Male
- Language: Fijian

Origin
- Region of origin: Fiji

Jone is a predominantly Fijian masculine given name, a cognate of the English-language name John. In the Basque language, it is a female counterpart to Jon / Ion, again an equivalent of John. People bearing the name Jone include:

- Jone Amezaga (born 2005), Spanish footballer
- Jone Baledrokadroka, Fijian military soldier
- Jone Blikra (born 1962), Norwegian police officer and politician
- Jone Daunivucu (born 1977), Fijian rugby union player
- Jone Delai (born 1967), Fijian sprinter
- Jone Ibáñez (born 1997), Spanish footballer
- Jone Kalouniwai, Fijian military major general, commander of the Republic of Fiji Military Forces
- Jone Kikau (died 1984), Fijian Ratu, civil servant and politician
- Jone Koroiduadua (born 1999), Fijian rugby union player
- Jone Kubu (born 1961), Fijian rugby union player
- Jone Kubuabola (1946–2018), Fijian politician, former Fijian Minister for Finance
- Jone Kuraduadua, Fijian rugby league player
- Jone Macilai (born 1983), Fijian rugby league player
- Jone Macilai-Tori (born 1990), Fijian rugby union player
- Jone Morino (1896–1978), Italian actress
- Joni Madraiwiwi (1859–1920), Fijian Ratu and early colonial administrator
- Jone Naikabula (born 1994), Fijian-born Japanese professional rugby union player
- Jone Navakamocea, Fijian Ratu and politician
- Jone Nikula (born 1970), Finnish television and radio personality
- Jone Pinto (born 1991), Brazilian footballer
- Jone Qovu (born 1985), Fijian rugby union player
- Jone Railomo (1981–2009), Fijian rugby union player
- Jone Romano (1898–1979), Italian actress
- Jone Rova (born 2002), New Zealand rugby union player
- Jone Salinas (1918–1992), Italian actress
- Jone Samuelsen (born 1984), Norwegian footballer
- Jone Tawake (born 1982), Fijian rugby union player
- Jone Usamate (born 1962), Fijian politician, former Minister for Infrastructure and Meteorological Services and Minister for Lands and Mineral Resources
- Jone Wesele (born 2001), Fijian rugby league player
