= Janke =

Janke is a name of Germanic origin. Spelling variations include Jancke, Jankhe, and (rarely) Janckhe. The name is derived from a diminutive for the male name Jan (a form of John or Johan), and features the suffix "-ke".

Notable people with the surname Janke include:

- Barbara Janke (born 1947), British teacher and politician
- Bogna Janke (born 1973), Polish politician
- Curt W. Janke (1892–1975), American politician
- Dennis Janke (born 1950), American comic book artist
- Dexter Janke (born 1992), Canadian football defensive back
- Franz Janke (1790-c. 1860), Slovak-born Habsburg engineer and architect
- Fred Janke (1917–2009), American football player, business executive and politician
- Friedrich Janke (born 1931), German long-distance runner
- Gabriele Janke (born 1956), German fencer
- Janusz Janke (born 1966), Polish diplomat
- Karin Janke (born 1963), retired German sprinter
- Kleber Janke (born 1988), Brazilian footballer
- Maxmillian Janke (born 1993), German handball player
- Merv Janke (born 1956), Australian speedway rider
- Terri Janke, Wuthathi/Meriam Indigenous lawyer
- Toni Janke, Australian soul singer
- Zygmunt Walter-Janke, Polish officer and historian

== See also ==
- Janke Nunatak, Antarctica
- Janke Township, Logan County, North Dakota, United States
