= Zbyšek Sion =

Czech painter and printmaker (1938–2025)

Zbyšek Sion, MFA
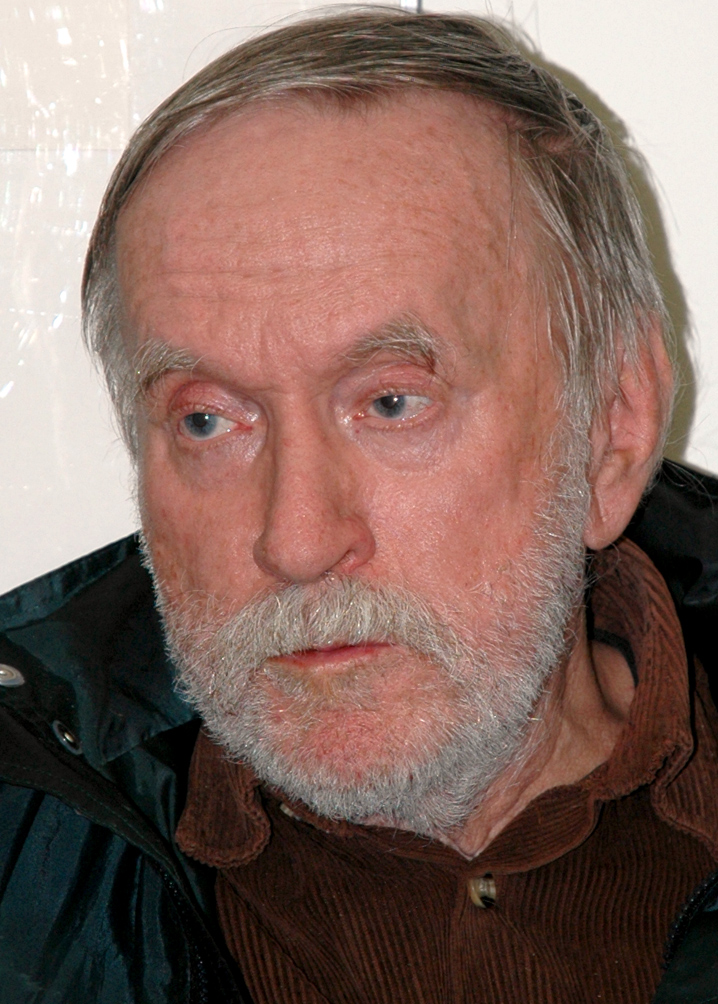
- Sion in 2012
- Born: 12 April 1938; Polička, Czechoslovakia
- Died: 21 October 2025 (aged 87); Polička, Czech Republic
- Education: Academy of Fine Arts in Prague
- Notable work: Situation – How to Make Behave with a Stick, 1969
- Movement: structural abstraction (60s)

Zbyšek Sion (12 April 1938 – 21 October 2025) was a Czech painter and printmaker, a co-founder of Czech structural abstraction art. His later works were mostly imaginative and illusionistic paintings, often on a general warning theme or bearing a strong political symbolism.

== Life and career ==
Born in Polička, Zbyšek Sion had a dramatic childhood, personally witnessing the horrors of World War II. In 1944 his father, who had been arrested by the Gestapo at the start of the war, died in a German prison. During the war Sion saw a drawing of an idyllic landscape by a local painter, Josef Václav Síla, that had been splattered with a German soldier's brains in an exchange of fire with partisans, and this proved to be another formative experience.

When Sion was growing up, his cousin Otokar Aleš Kukla, an art historian and director of the Polička Museum, would lend him books on art.

In 1953 Sion began studying at the School of Applied Arts in Brno, where he became friends with another painter, Antonín Tomalík. In 1957 Sion and Tomalík commenced a preparatory year at the Academy of Fine Arts in Prague, taught by Jaroslav Vodrážka. From 1958 to 1964 he studied at the Academy under Karel Souček and Jiří Horník, but as was the case with the entire generation of his contemporaries at the Academy, extracurricular activities and contacts with members of the future Confrontations group proved to be more significant for Sion's development as a painter than his studies. At a party at the Academy on Saint Nicholas Eve 1958, featuring The Šmidras, Sion met the group's members (Jan Koblasa, Karel Nepraš, Bedřich Dlouhý), and later, in 1960, he met Vladimír Boudník, Robert Piesen, and Mikuláš Medek, all key figures in Czech post-war abstract art.

Zbyšek Sion and Antonín Tomalík were both included in Confrontations II, a private one-day exhibition held in Aleš Veselý’s studio. Artists appearing in unofficial exhibitions risked being expelled from their studies, which was why the organisers of the first structural abstraction exhibitions in Warsaw (1962) and at Nová síň in Prague (Exhibition D, 1963) did not invite students to participate. By the time Sion took part in the Confrontations III exhibition, held in Prague in 1965, he had moved away from Art Informel in favour of a very different form of expression.

Sion's first solo exhibition was in Ústí nad Orlicí in 1966, followed a year later by exhibitions at Divadlo za branou in Prague and the Regional Gallery in Liberec. In the 1960s he took part in major exhibitions of Czech modern art, both within Czechoslovakia (the AICA congress, Phases) and abroad (Lignano, Turin, Dortmund, and. Paris).

In 1958–1962 Zbyšek Sion was one of the founders of a group that later became known as The Crusaders’ School of Pure Humour Without a Joke (together with Zdeněk Beran, Antonín Tomalík, and Antonín Málek). After 1967 the group moved its base from one pub (U Křižovníků) to another (U Svitáků). The group played an important role during the normalization era leading up to the founding of Charter 77. Sion’s employment during the normalisation years included a brief period operating a water pump for an engineering geology company, Stavební geologie Praha (1974–1975). He had no further solo exhibitions in Czechoslovakia until 1990, but he was included in several collective exhibitions abroad (Düsseldorf, Padua, Konstanz) and at regional galleries. In 1973 and 1977 he held private exhibitions for his friends in his cellar studio in Vinohrady in Prague.

After Velvet Revolution in 1989, Sion was appointed associate professor in the painting studio at the Academy of Fine Arts. He took part in a symposium on Art Informel (1991) and was featured at the exhibition Czech Art Informel: Pioneers of Abstraction 1957–1964. In 1993 he had retrospective exhibitions in Roudnice nad Labem, The Václav Špála Gallery in Prague, and the Ostrava House of Art. In 1996 Sion had another retrospective at the Rudolfinum Gallery in Prague.

Zbyšek Sion lived and worked in Polička. He died there on 21 October 2025, at the age of 87.

== Work ==
Zbyšek Sion's paintings convey an existential sense of tragedy with a coarse and even cruel grotesqueness.

Literature has always been an important inspiration for Sion. Before commencing at the Academy of Fine Arts he had read Strindberg and Kafka, and he had begun illustrating Dostoevsky’s Crime and Punishment. At the Academy the young undergraduates were attracted to chiaroscuro Baroque painting. Sion’s early drawings from his student years were dominated by black, and besides pub scenes his most frequent motifs were skulls, crucifixes and melancholic and introverted self-portraits (“I was Hamlet... at that age, who wasn’t?”). The harshness of the Stalinist regime in the late 1950s and the accompanying anxiety and despair are reflected in Sion’s darkly existential versions of Old Testament and New Testament stories (Salome, 1961) and Crucifixion scenes, all revolving around suffering and sacrifice.

After visiting the Founders of Modern Art exhibition in Brno in 1957 his drawings had a freer stylisation, and in his progression to modern painting Sion found inspiration in Bohumil Kubišta, Expressionism and Proto-Cubism. This quest for abstraction was shared by all the artists with whom he associated; it was their response to officially favoured and imposed Socialist Realism.

In a cycle of skulls and heads from 1959, Sion’s transition to radical abstraction culminated in Veil of Veronica, where all ties to reality had disappeared. At the end of 1959 Sion began creating non-representational compositions, gestural drawings and pastose gouaches dominated by black (Untitled; Visitor; Dream about Venice). In 1960 Jiří Kolář and Mikuláš Medek viewed a selection of private works that Sion had created while dwelling at the dormitory of the Academy of Performing Arts in Prague.

Sion’s paintings from the Academy were dominated by figurative themes and landscapes, but from 1960 onwards he created in private the Below the Horizon cycle, where he experimented with action painting and worked with unconventional materials and techniques. He combined ink and gouache with collages made of scraps from newspapers, acrylic varnish, sand and other materials (Below the Horizon, collage, gouache, paper, 1960; Study of Structure, 1961). Layering, gouging and burning various materials produced dark eruptions of colours and forms in images that reflected the emotions of his generation and his experience of reality.

In 1962–1963 Sion returned to colour, producing both abstract and figurative compositions (Blue Structure; The Judgement of Paris) while creating a distinctive expressive style and complicated compositions based on his virtuoso drawing.

In parallel with his final year at the Academy (1963–1964), Sion worked in private on a cycle in which he gradually abandoned abstraction, using dramatically layered material structures, washes and scrubbed areas, together with pen and ink drawing and hatching, and he worked with subtle and overlapping blocks and facets of colour (Apocalyptic Cricket I–III, 1963–1966). This dynamic mosaic anticipated subsequent paintings in which he returned to the human figure with a fantastical grotesqueness (Chicken Usurper, Fair Moloch, 1963–1965).

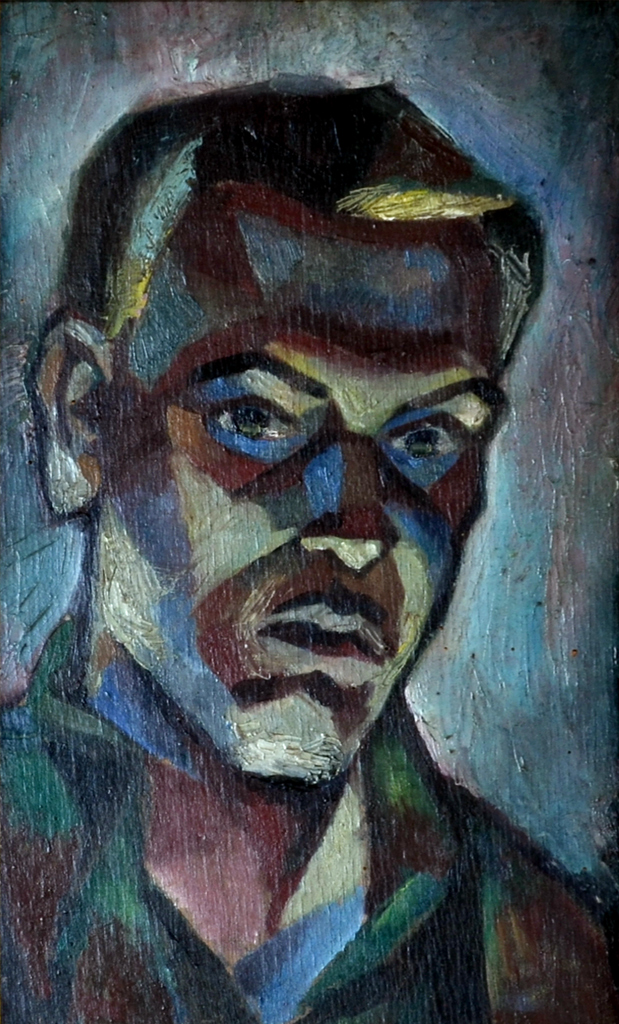
Zbyšek Sion, Self-Portrait (1958)

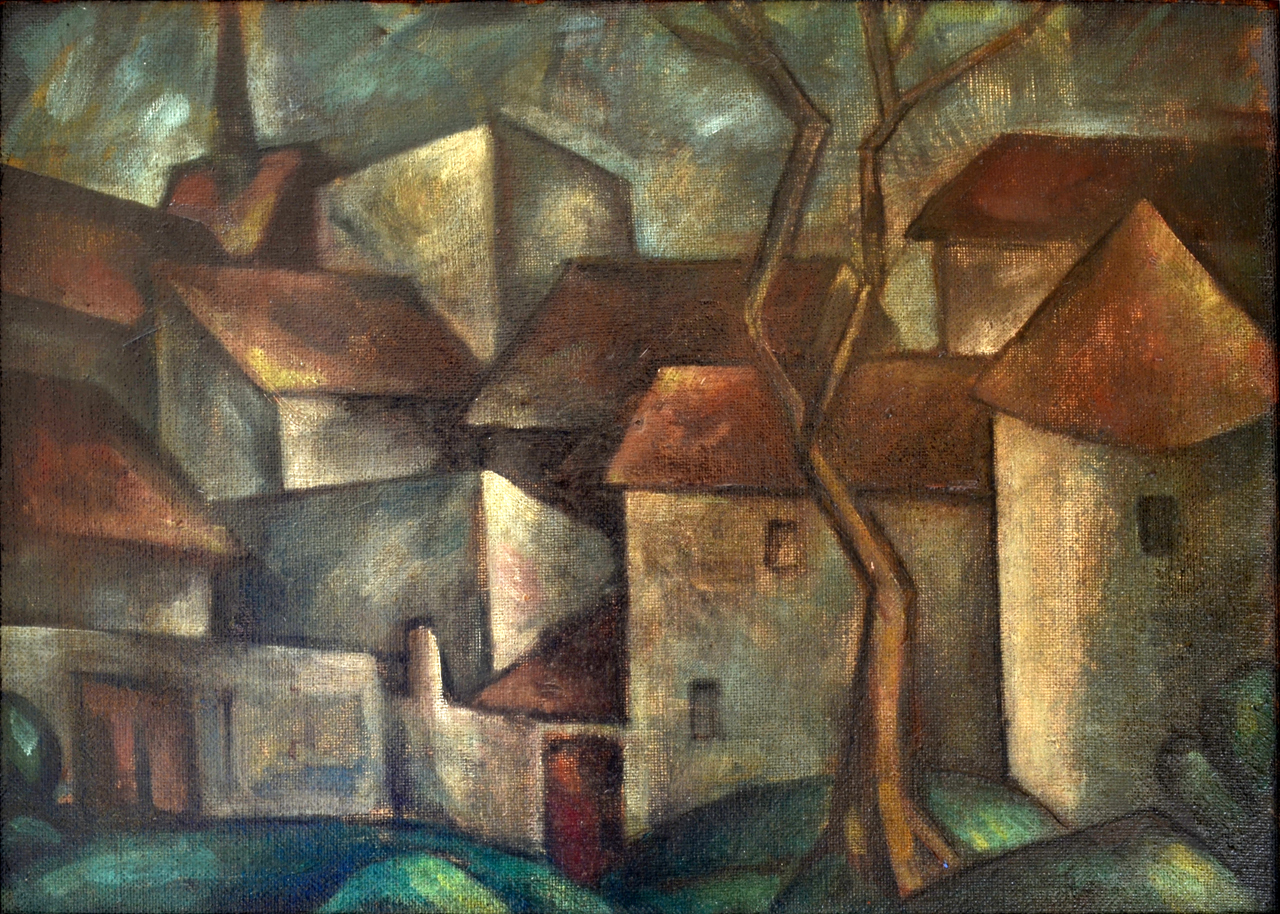
Polička (1958)

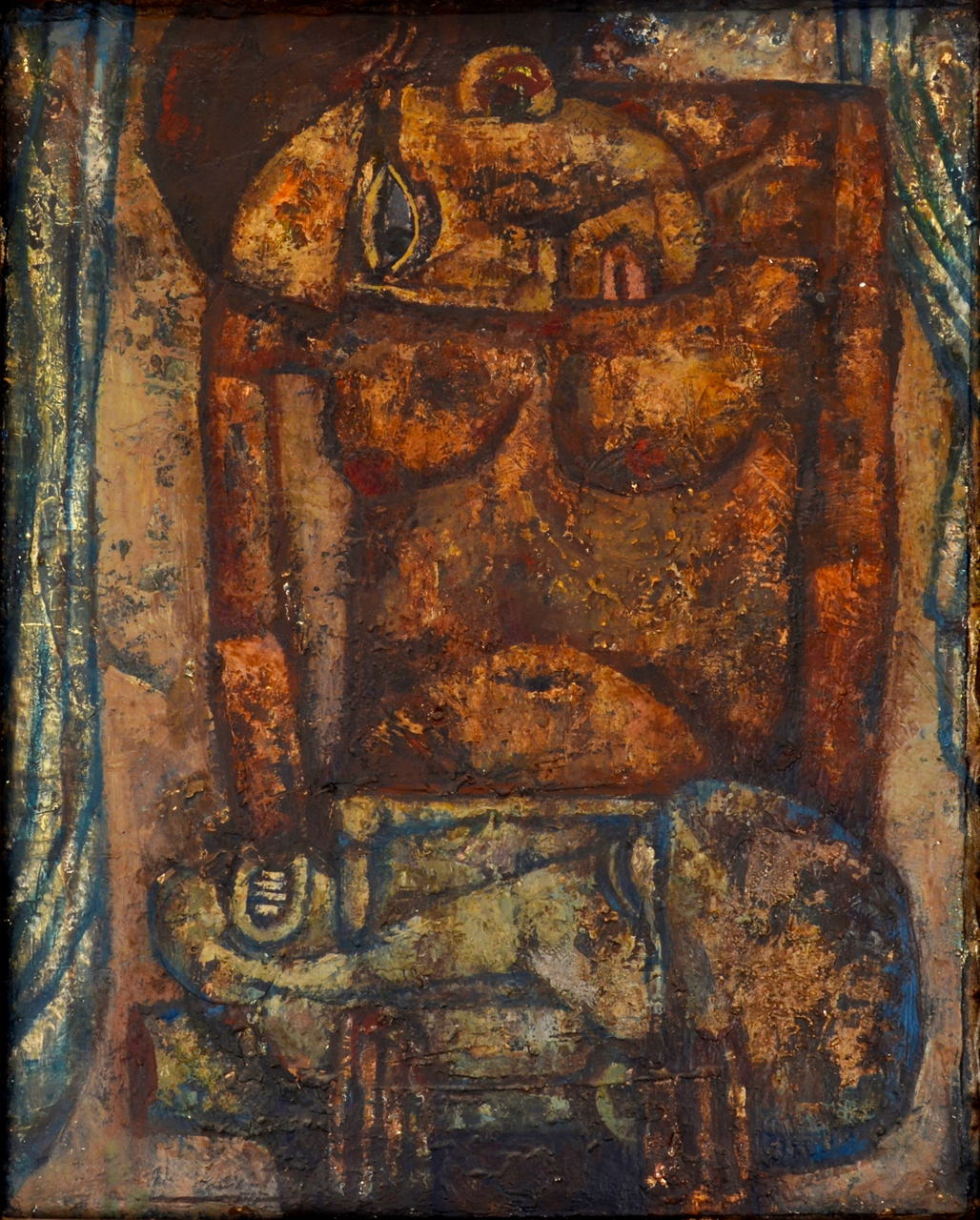
Salomé, (1961)

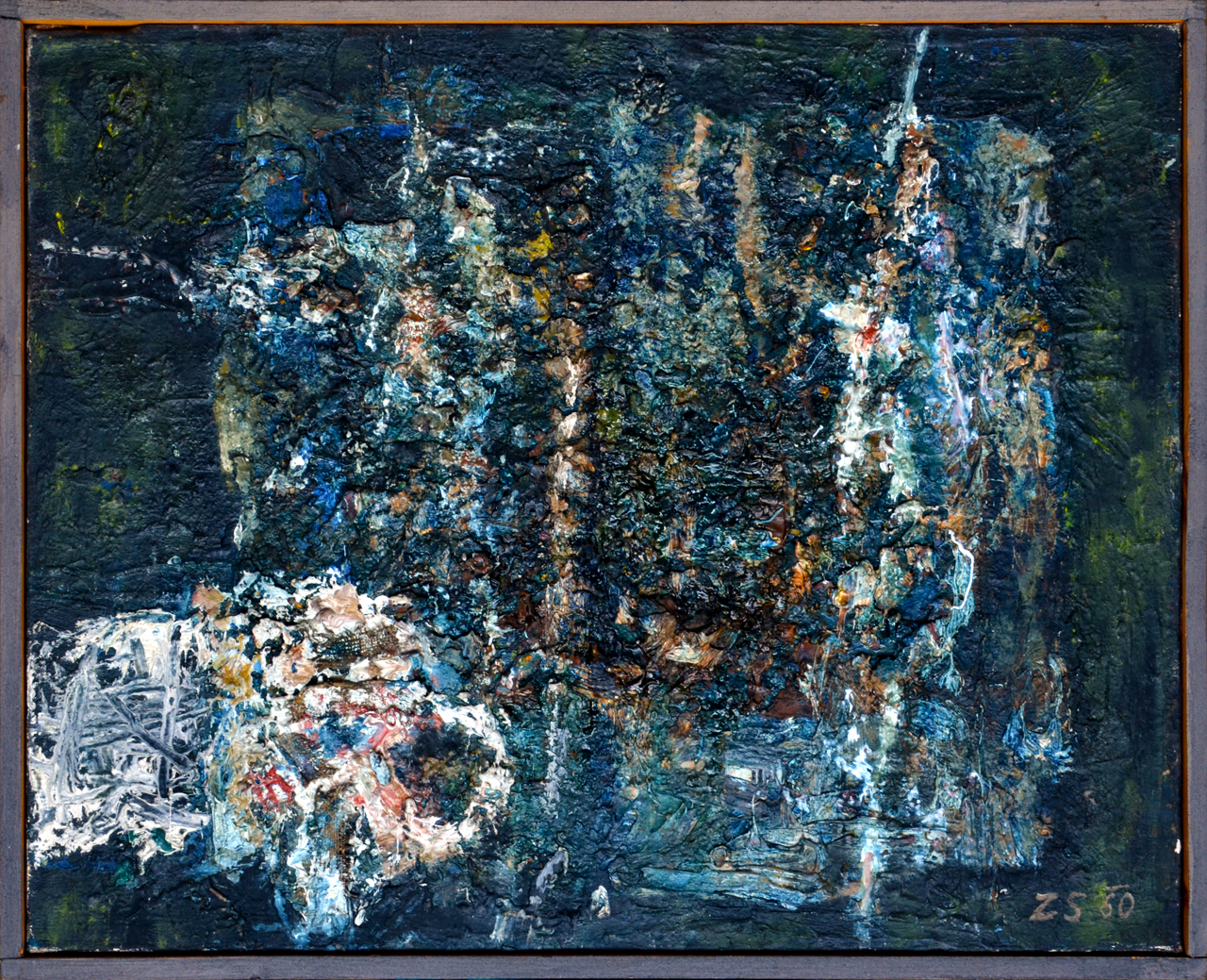
No title (1960)

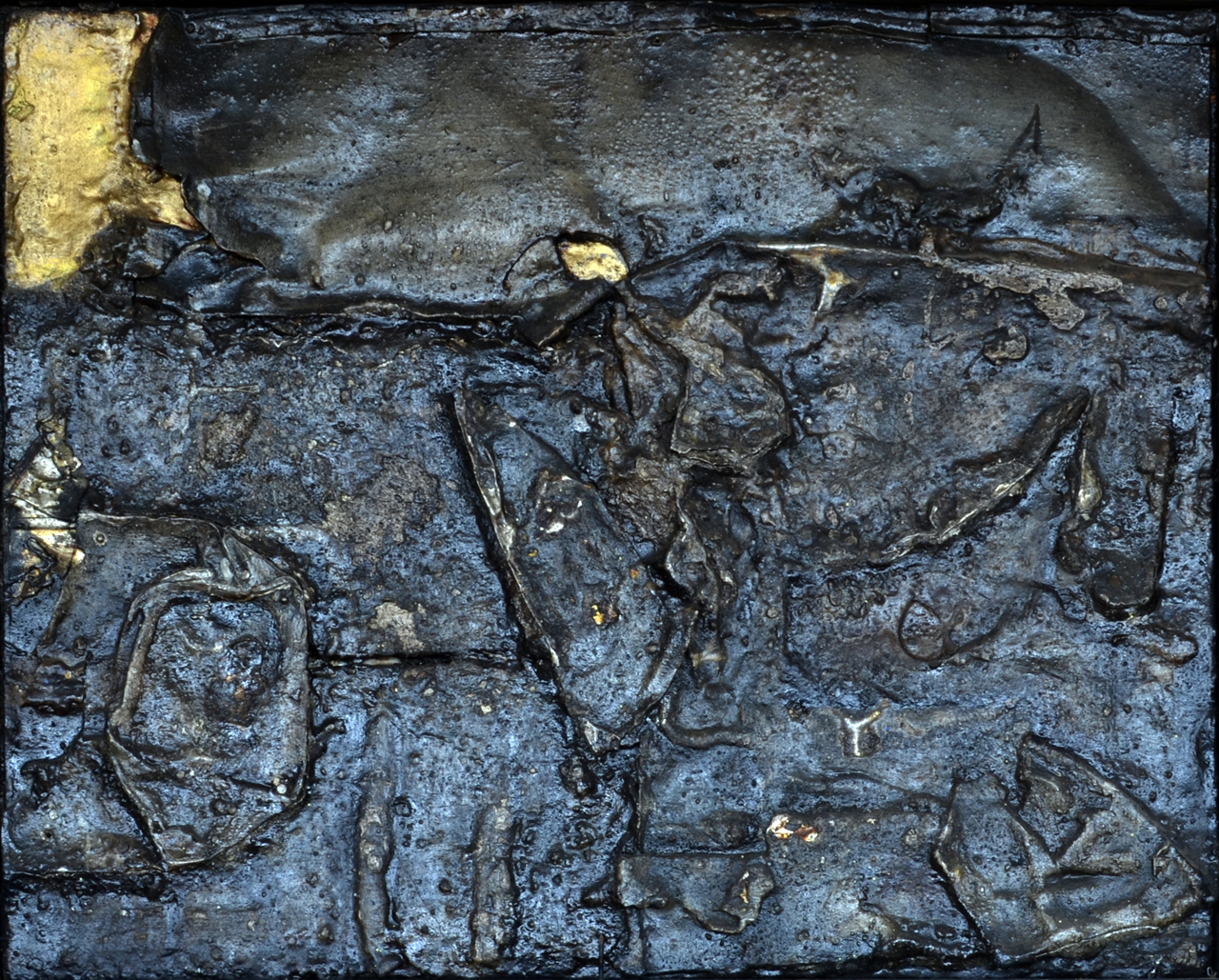
No title (1961)

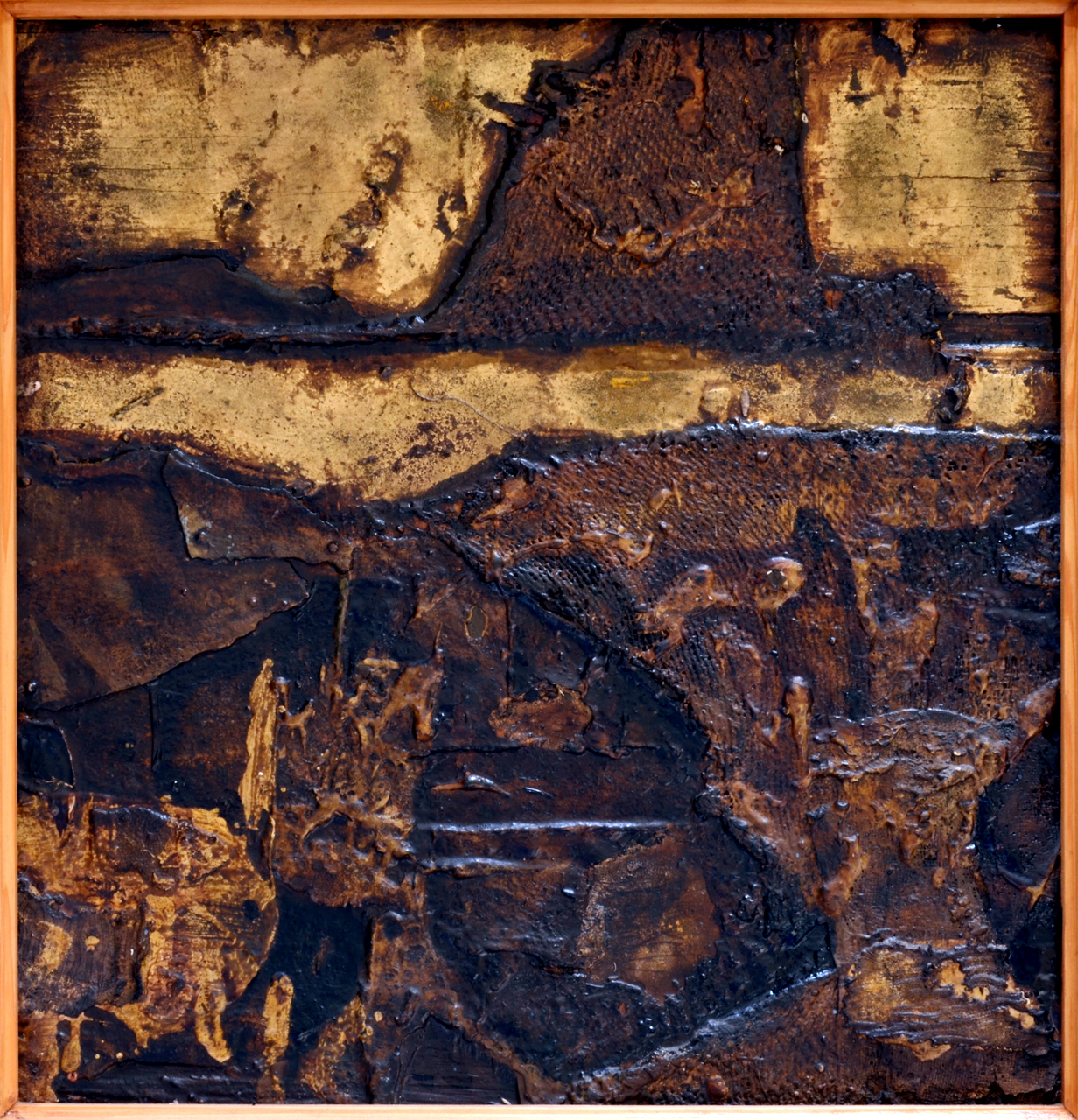
Archaeological Landscape (1961)

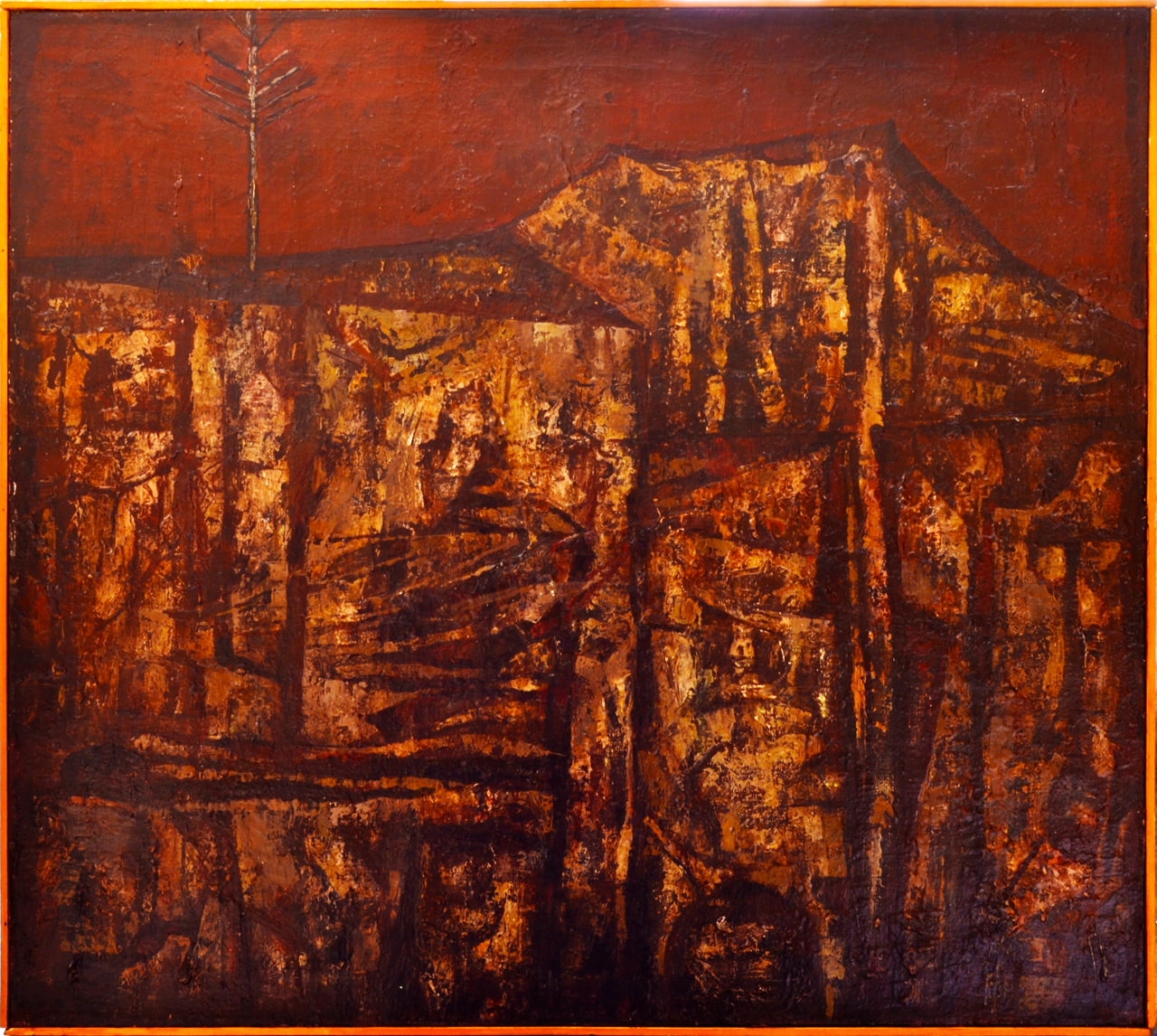
Red Landscape (1962)

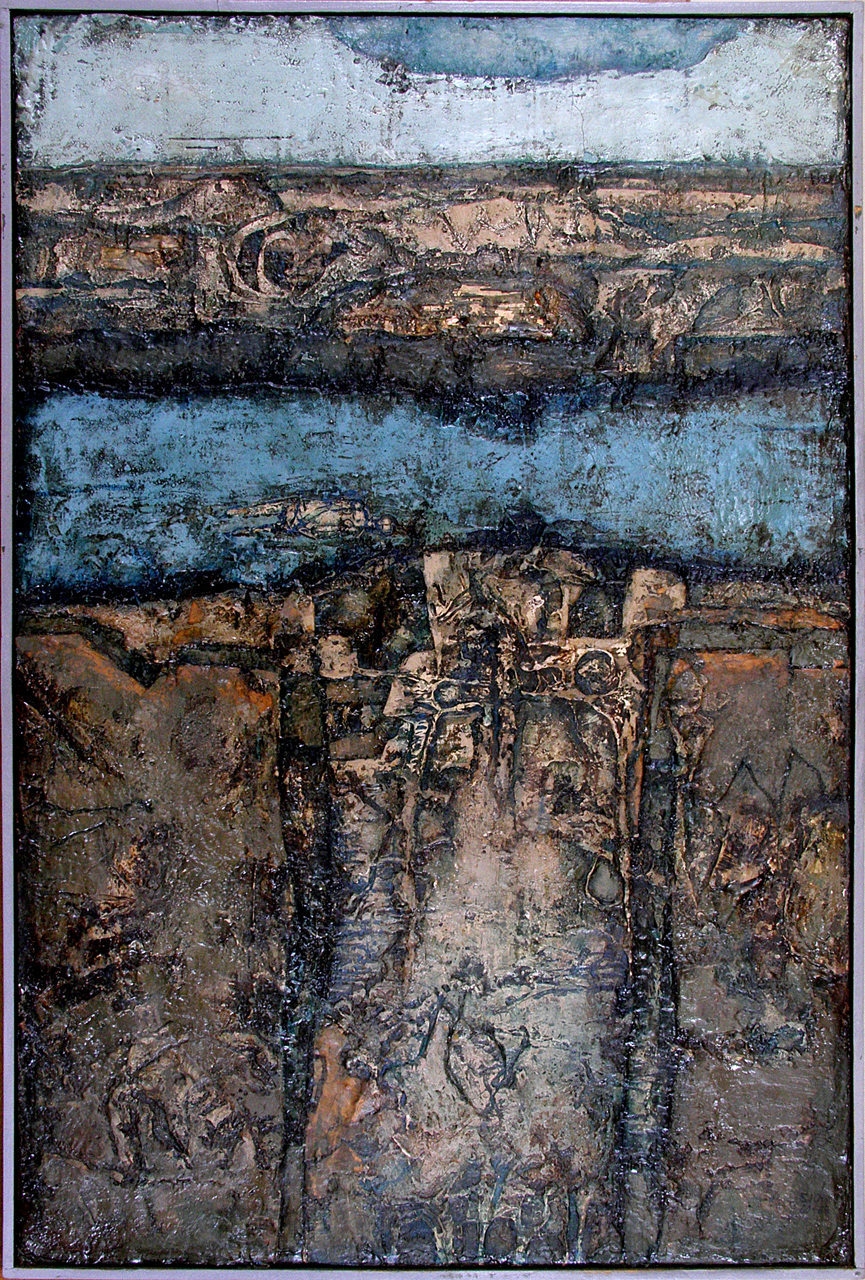
Styx (1960-63)

By the time of his first solo exhibition (1966) in Ústí nad Orlicí, Zbyšek Sion had presented himself as a painter of fantastical monsters and apocalyptic visions (The Fall of the Tower, 1966). Following the August 1968 occupation the titles of Sion’s painting cycles became an unambiguous testimony to his emotions (Treacherous Friend, 1968; Uninvited Guest, 1968; Situation – How to Make Behave with a Stick, 1969; Fugitive, 1969). Some figures were two-dimensional and made of numerous blotches of paint (Portrait of Young Lady D., 1968).

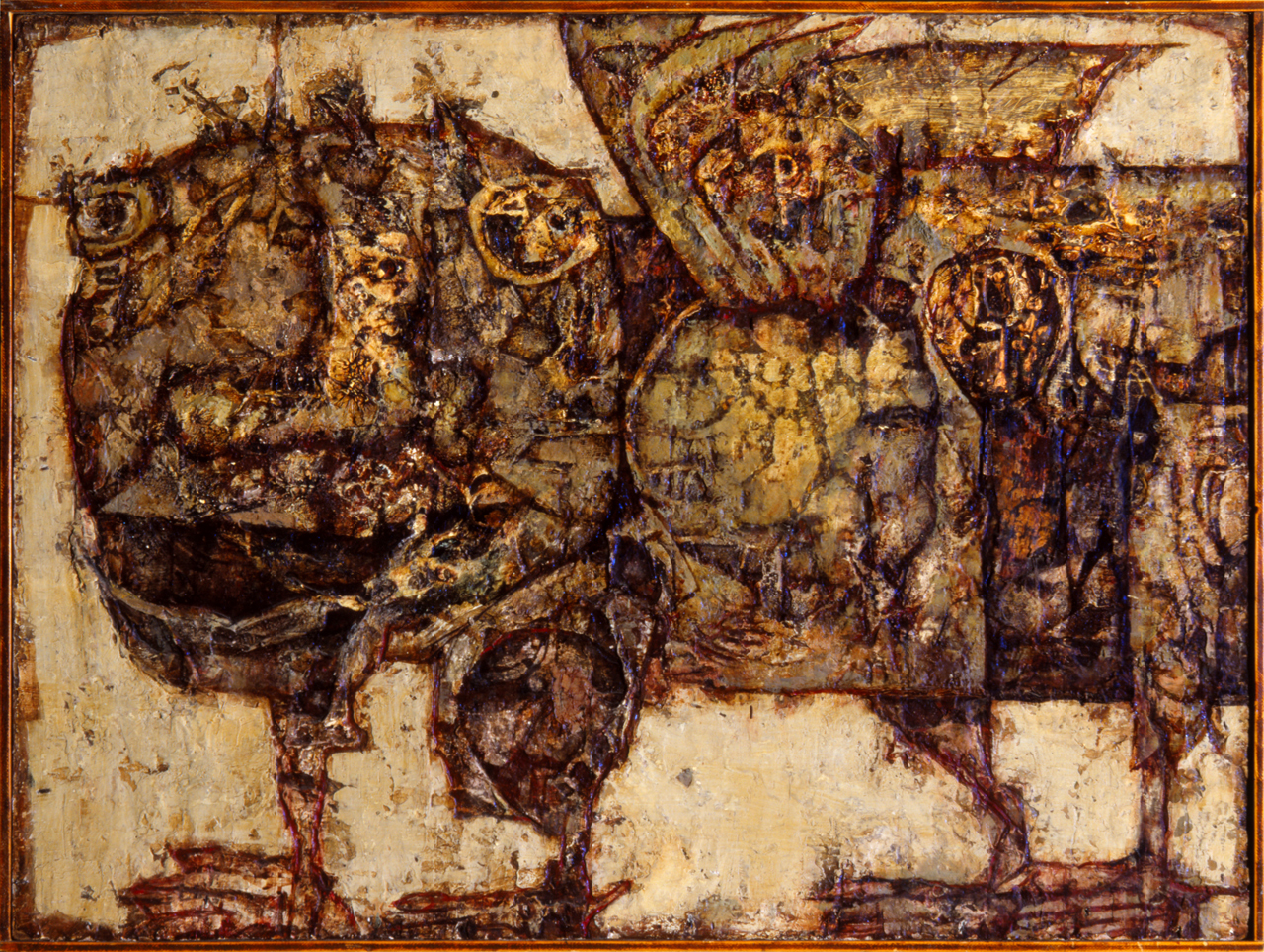
Apocalyptic Cricket I (1963)

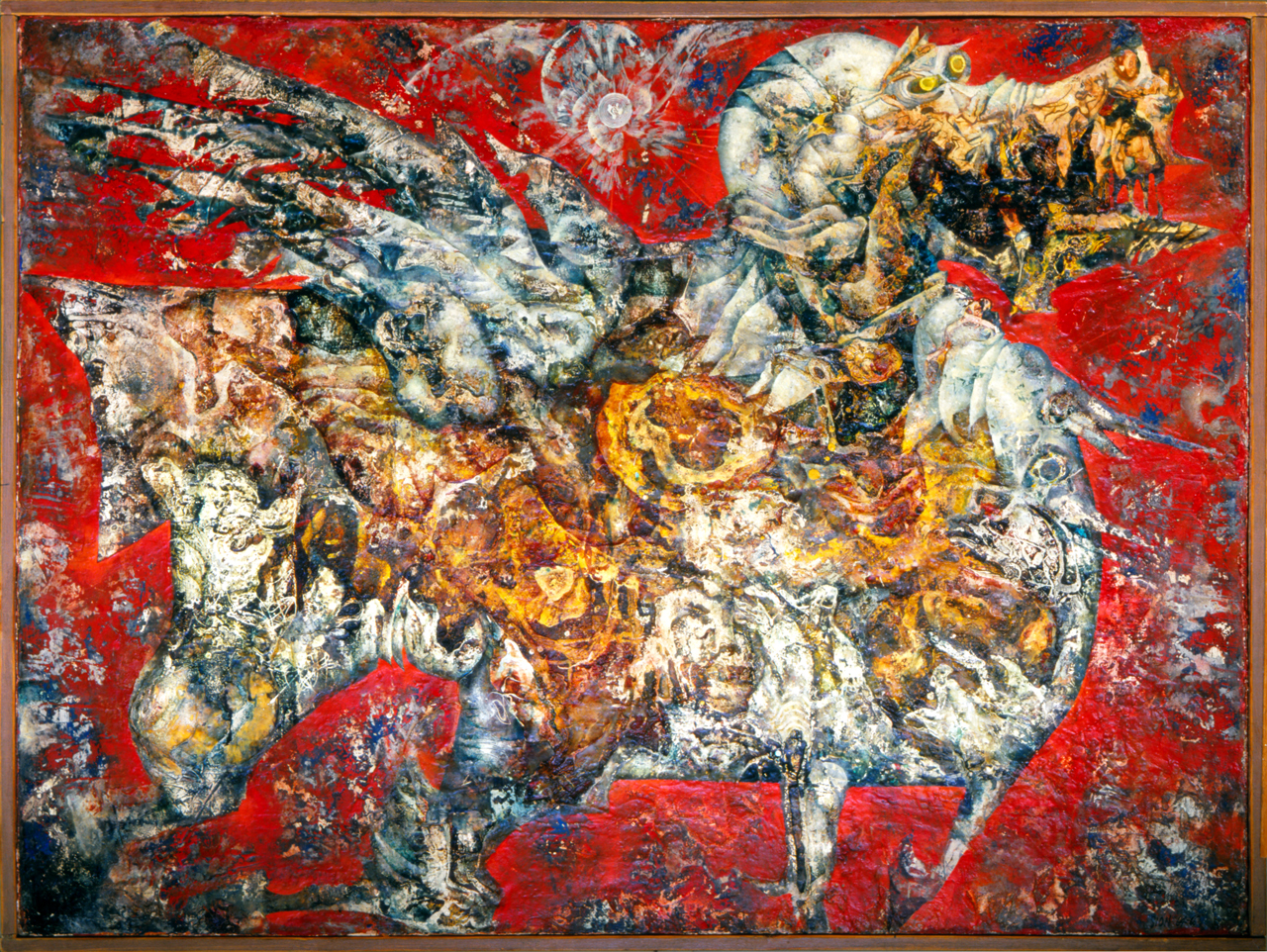
Apocalyptic Cricket II, olej, 92x120 cm, (1964-66)

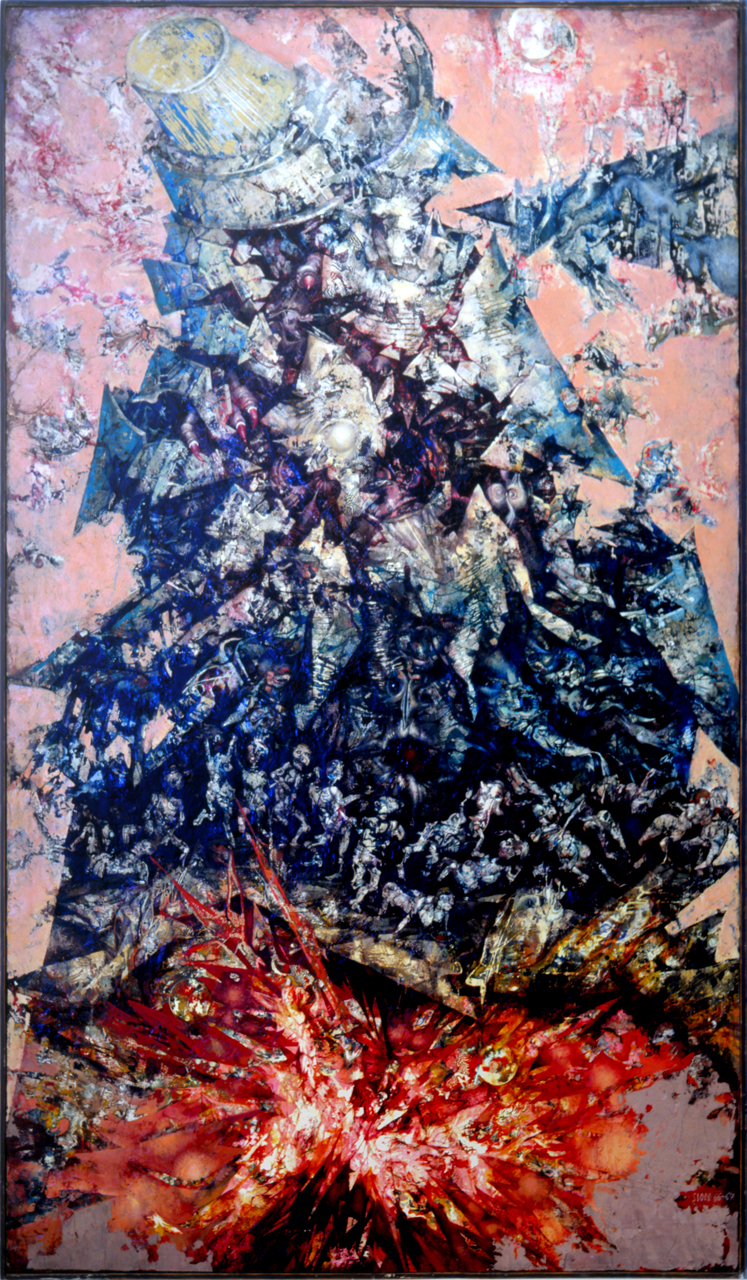
The Fall of the Tower (1966-67)

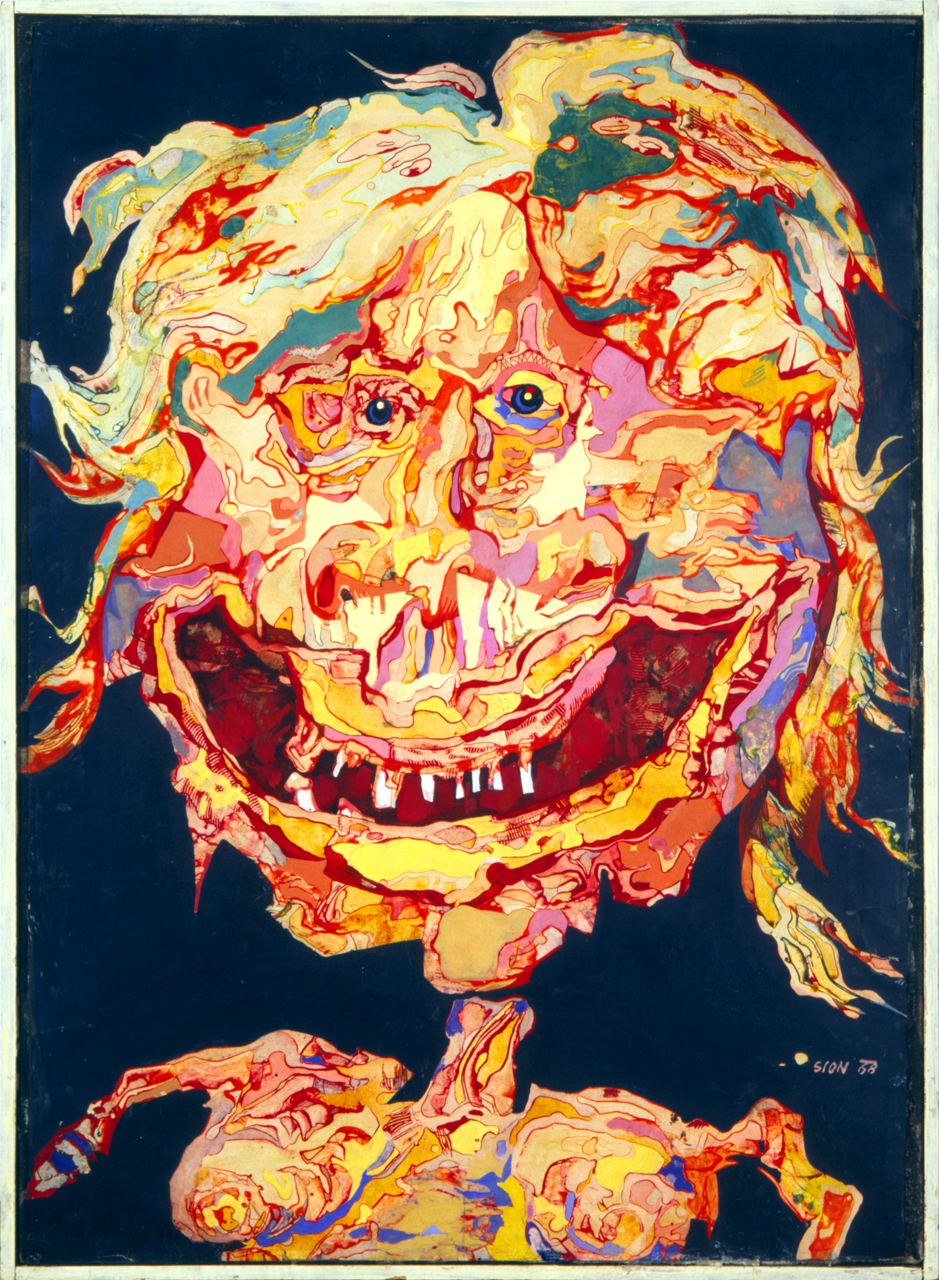
Portrait of Young Lady D. (1968)

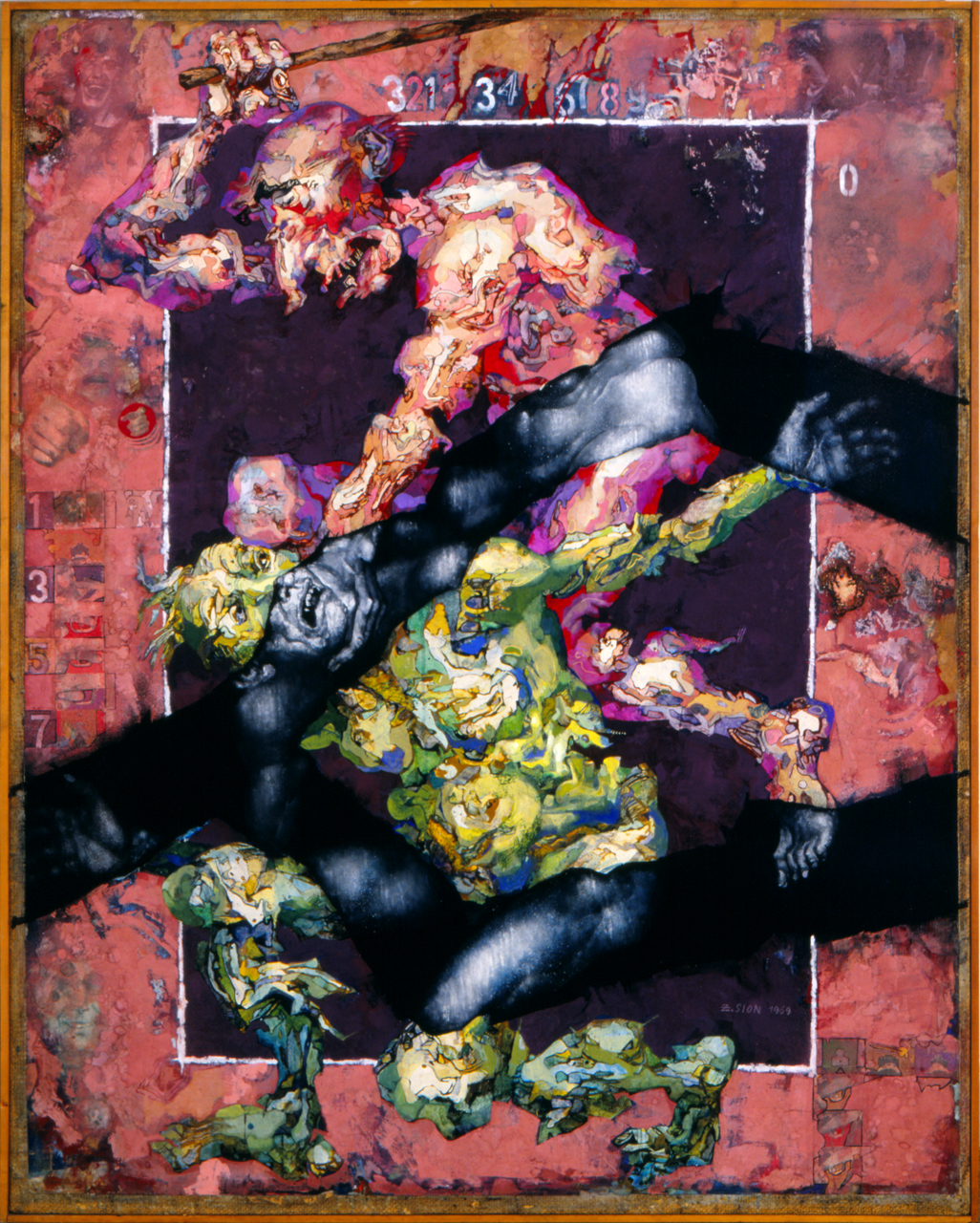
Situation – How to Make Behave with a Stick (1969)

In the 1970s Sion’s painting evolved into a distinctive kind of mannerism, in which he quoted famous works (Le dernier déjeuner sur l’herbe, 1971, 1973) or paintings by the old masters (e.g. Velázquez in Sisyphus, 1975–1976) and came close to illusionistic painting. His figures gained volume and realistic detail, and the picture space became deeper (Amora, 1974–1975; Wrestlers, 1976–1977). This period of Sion’s painting culminated in vivid dramas that were overburdened with symbolism (Greenhouse with Cryptogamic Venus, 1976; The Careful Gardener, 1980).

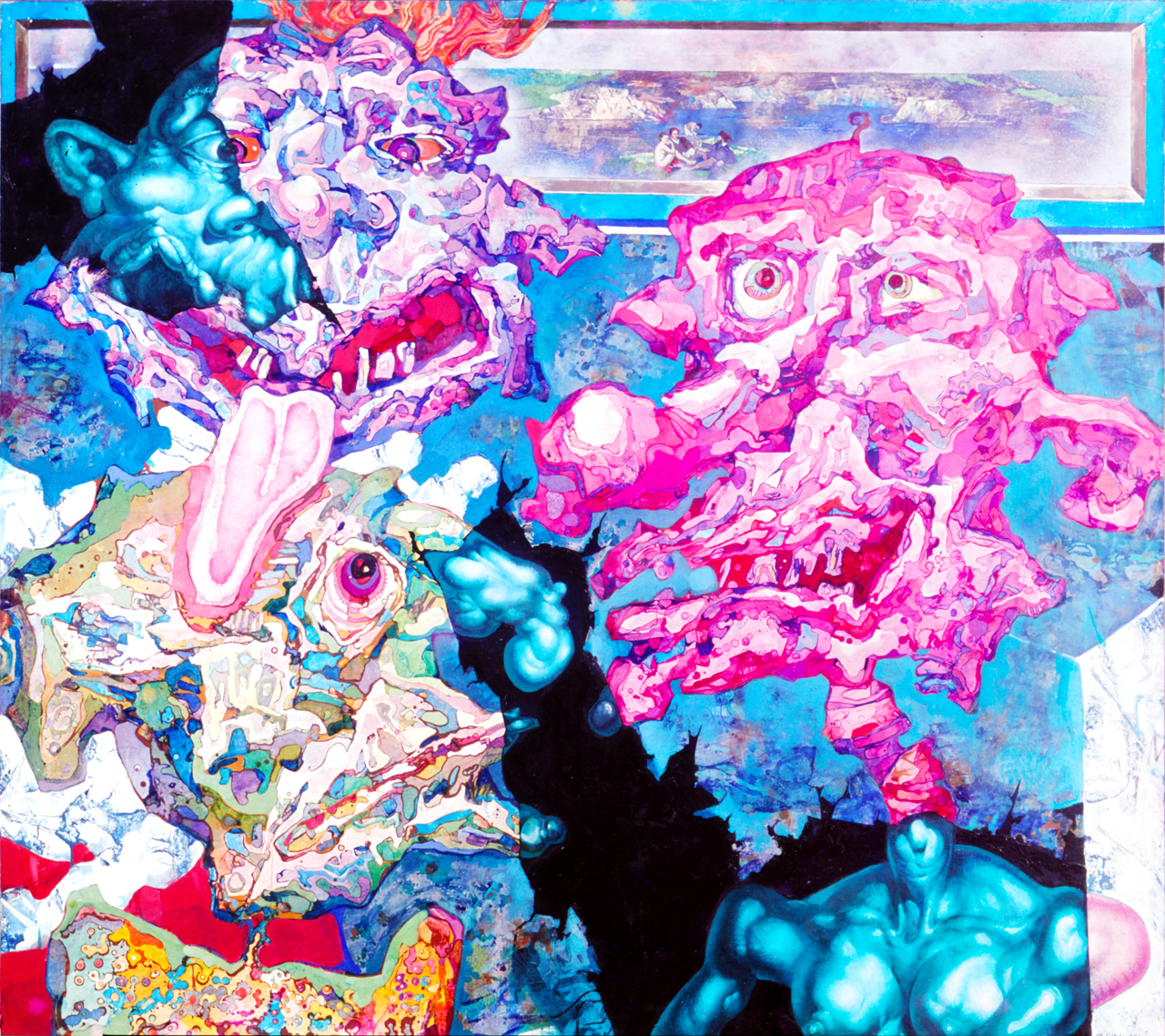
Le dernier déjeuner sur l’herbe I, (1971)

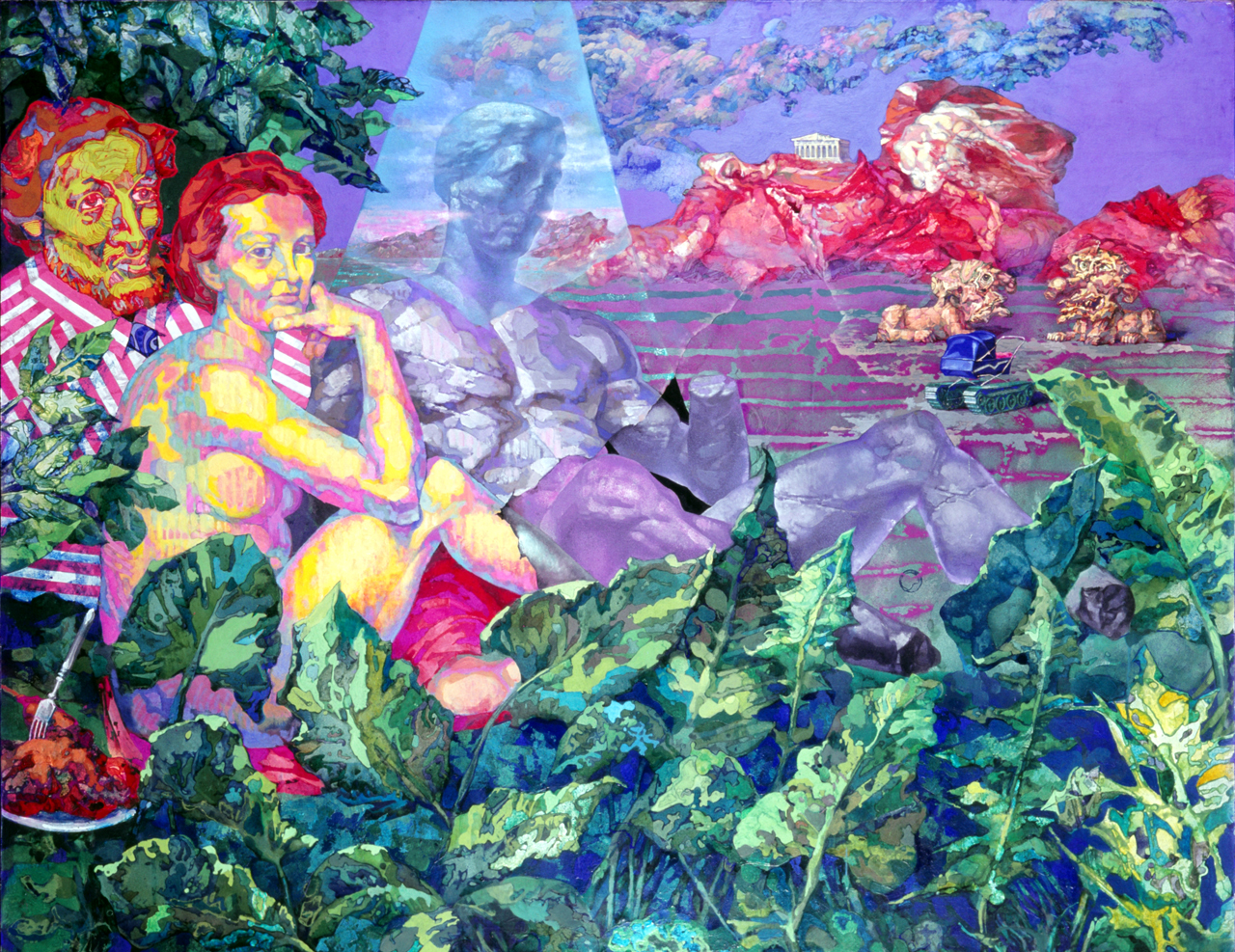
Le dernier déjeuner sur l’herbe II (1973)

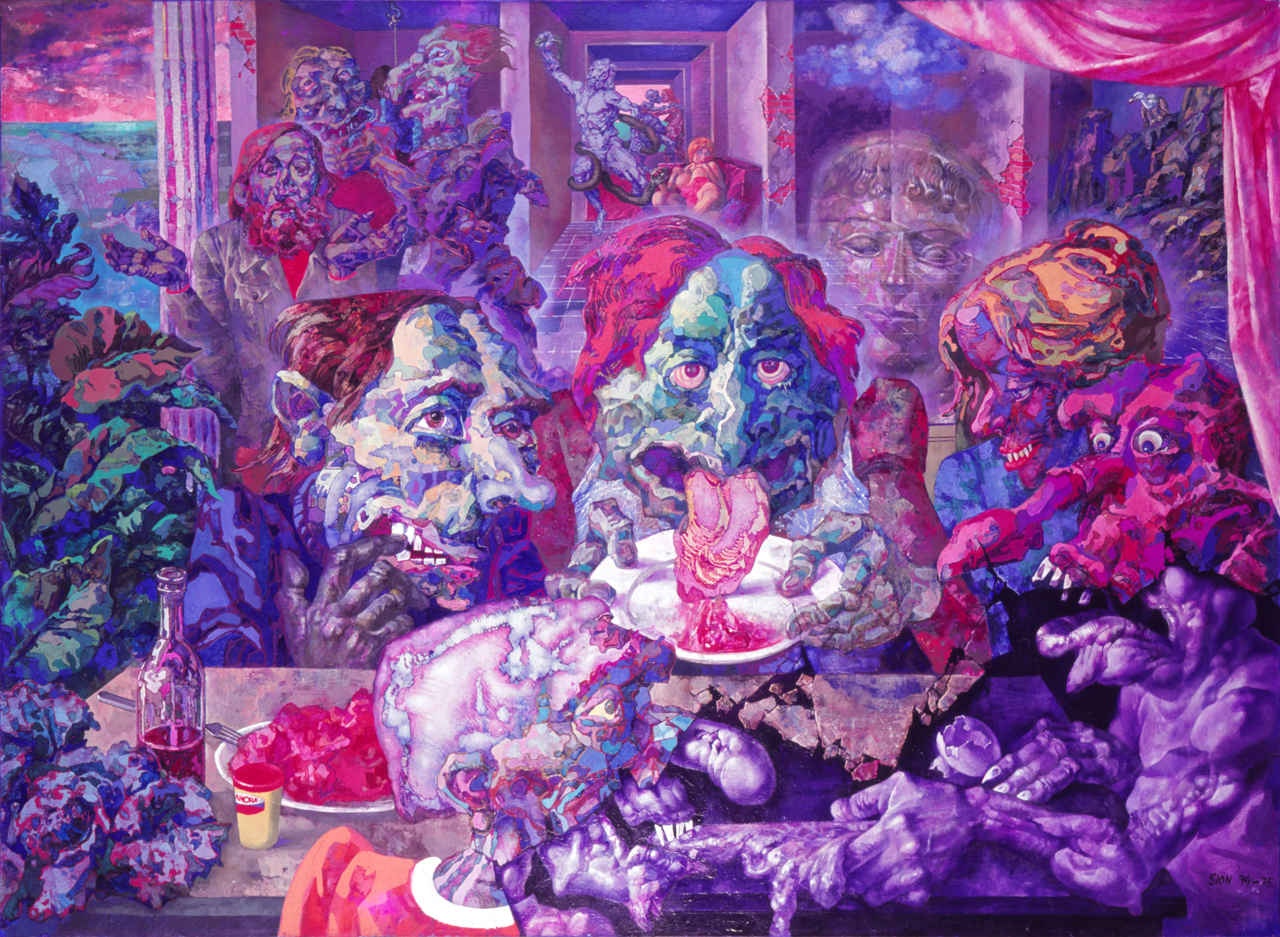
Amora (1974-75)

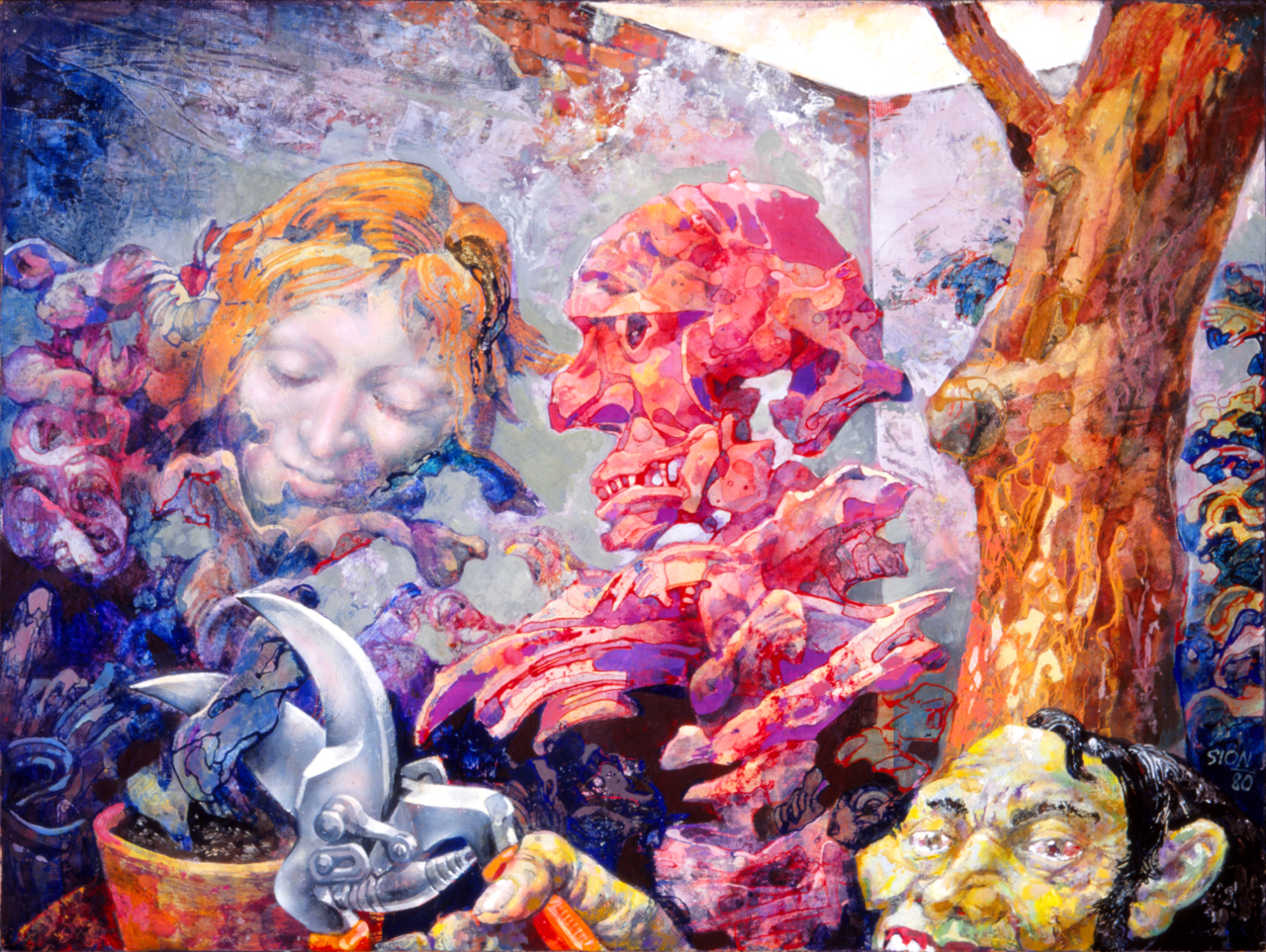
The Careful Gardener (1980)

Sion’s paintings from the 1980s were increasingly inspired by the contemporary world, transforming profane reality into pitiless morality plays (The Three Graces, 1980; Thrilling Finish, 1980; Reconstruction of a Head, 1981; Bubbles, 1981–1982). In the 1990s Sion, gradually abandoning narratives, figures and heads, turned to landscapes (Something in a Landscape, 1992). “This landscape is what’s left of nature, a remote region that still refuses to become the burial ground of what’s left of people.” Other landscapes were colourful and full of structures and grids, but essentially dehumanised, and colder than Sion’s early Art Informel landscapes from the Below the Horizon cycle. Their titles indicated that Sion had found his subject matter in the potential threats posed by a new era (Genetic Acrobatics, 1987–1988; Cosmic Games – Genetic Acrobatics II, 1993, Loops of Time, 1996).

A new element in Zbyšek Sion's paintings since 2000 are abstract studies of coloured structures (Compass, 2005; Gaps in Cracks, 2008) and paintings composed as the dynamic developing of an object in space (Dancing Lighthouse, 2009). He often brings together contrasting paintings to make triptychs that are full of inner tension (Remembering Mikuláš Medek, 2003; Three-Storey Painting, 2008).

Sion's combination of a central abstract or figurative structured painting with auto-frottages, framing it to create a triptych within a single painting (Plague Column; 2010; Diana Hunting ×3, 2011) can be seen as a distinctive and original contribution to contemporary modern painting. Sion believes that the possibilities of Art Informel are far from exhausted and have only ceased to be explored due to historical circumstances.

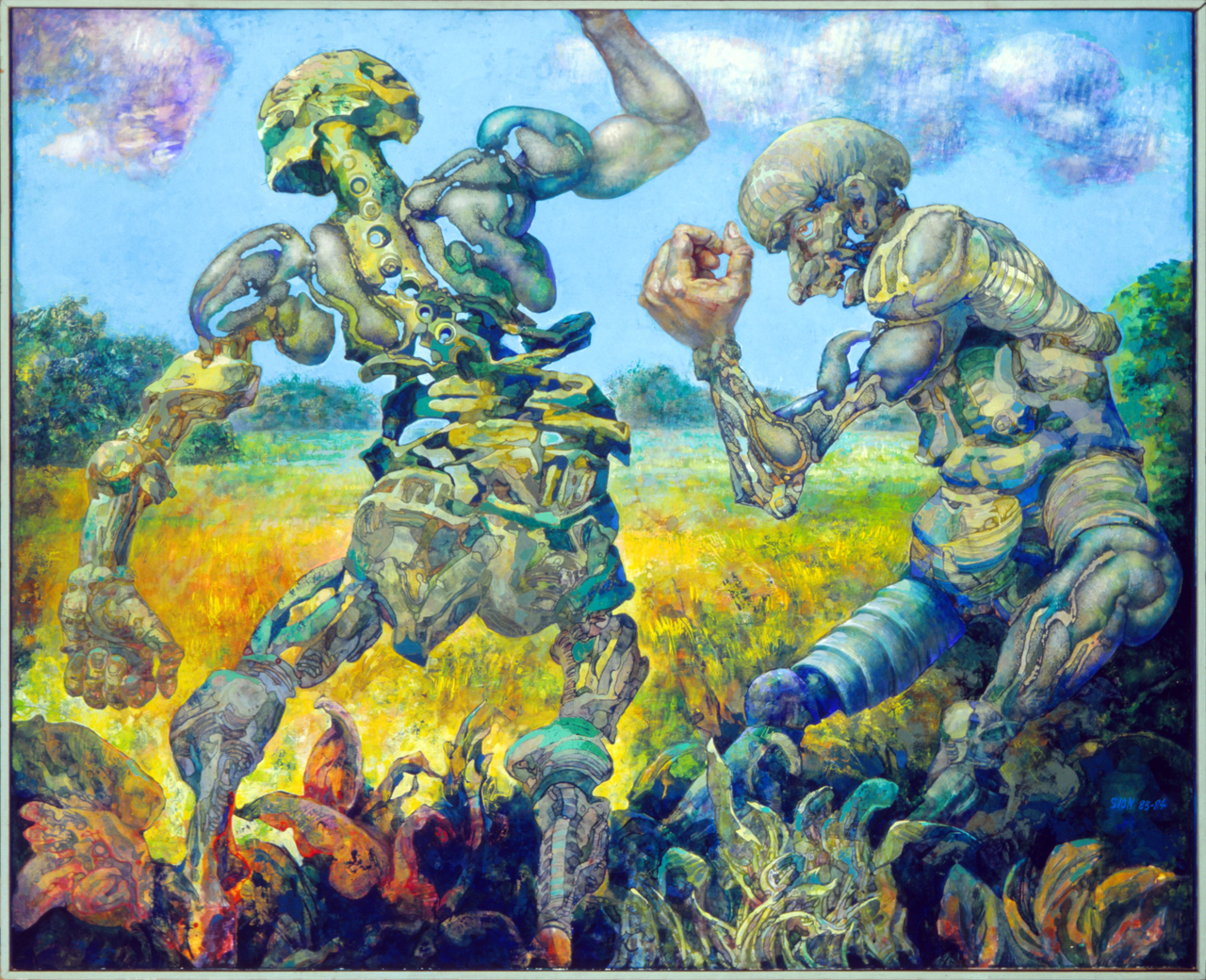
Natural Selection (1983–84)

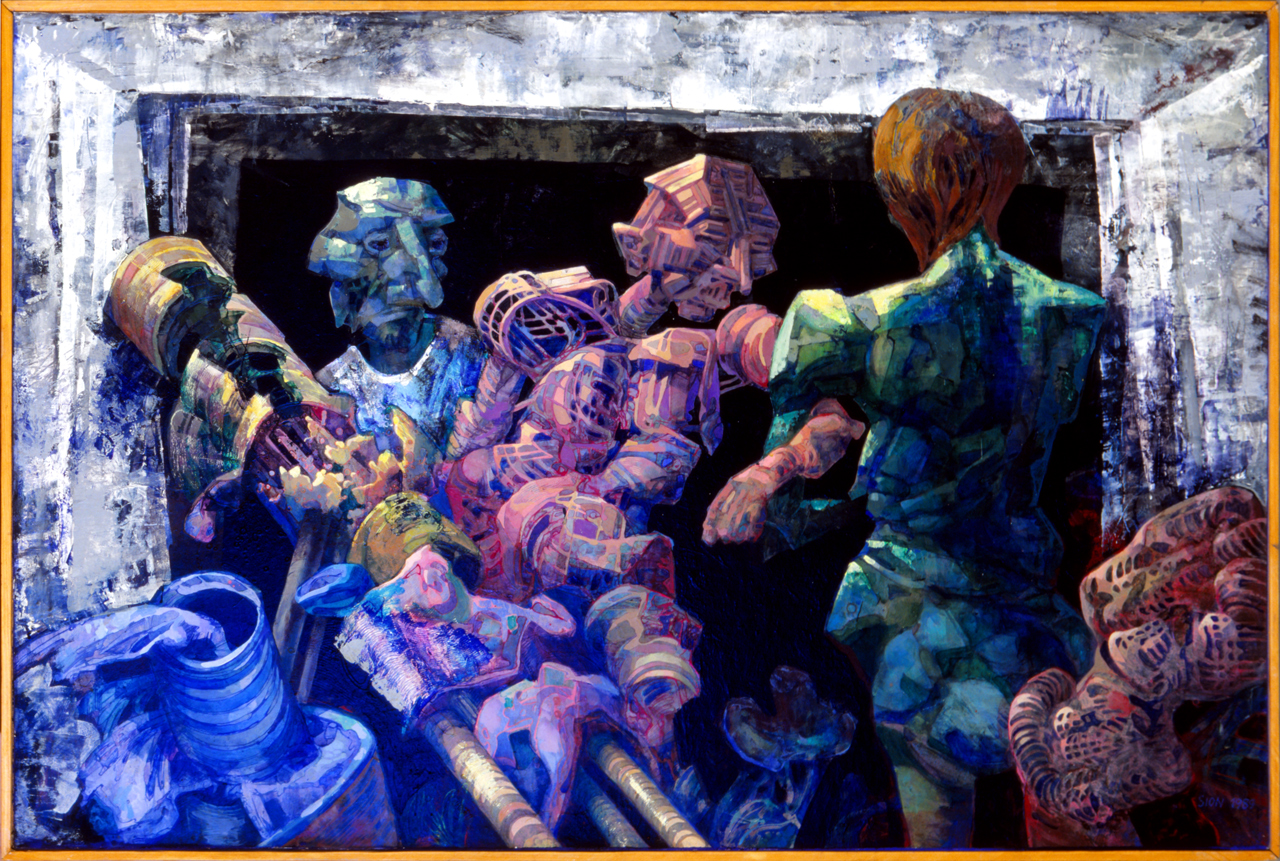
Exit from Stage (1989–90)

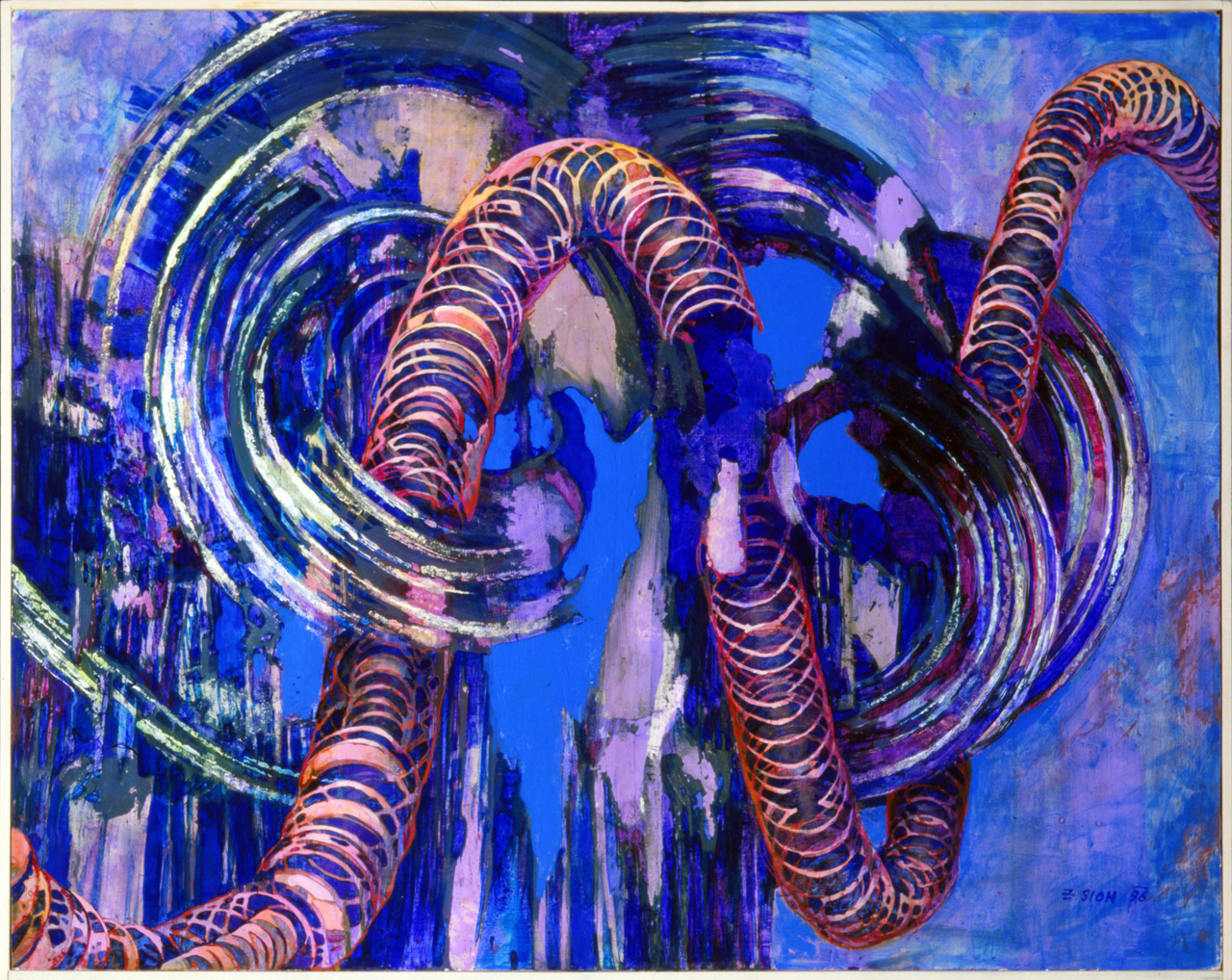
Loops of Time (1996)

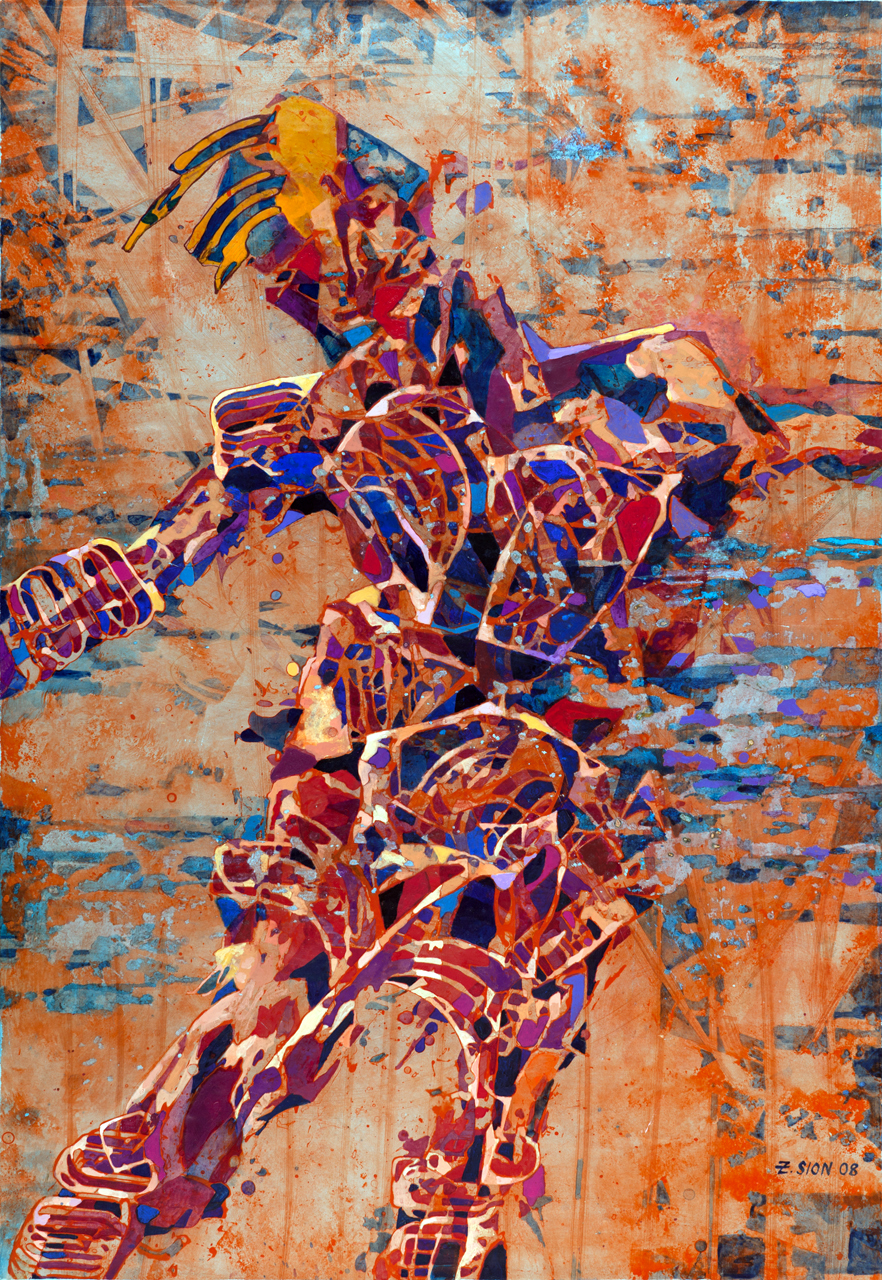
Will-o'-the-wisp (2008)

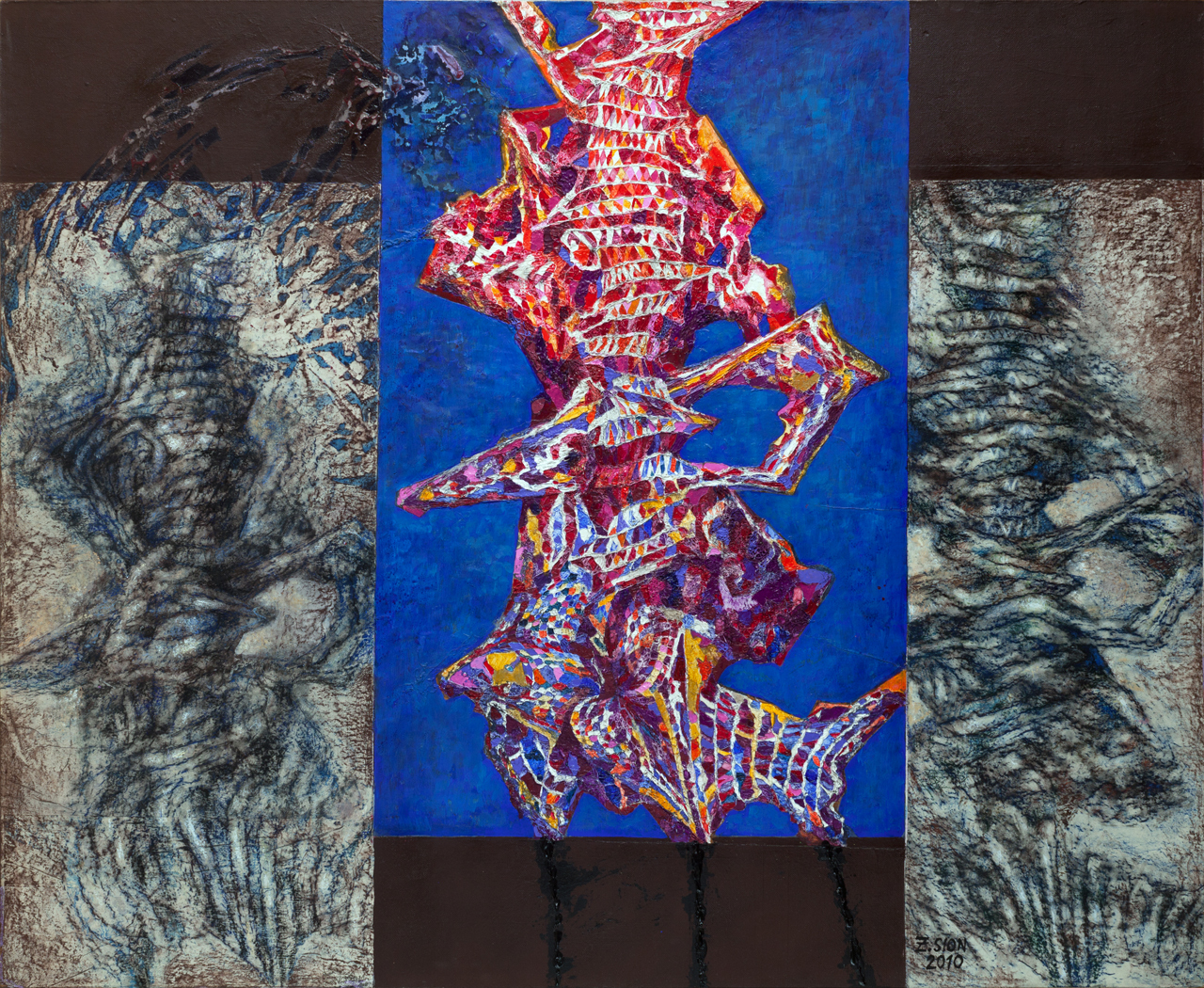
Plague Column (2010)

=== Appraisal ===
According to Petr Nedoma, the director of Rudolfinum Gallery in Prague, Zbyšek Sion has in his work consistently examined the ethical question of how the individual should behave when placed against his will in a world whose reality he is unwilling and perhaps unable to accept. He can only raise such pressing questions and reply to them truthfully in his work, in which hidden and suppressed obsessions and anxieties have given rise to a constant flow of fantastical and imaginative images, allegorical allusions and rich metaphors, creating his own communication code.

=== Collections ===
- National Gallery in Prague
- Moravian Gallery in Brno
- Regional galleries in the Czech Republic
- Galleria Arturo Schwarz, Milan
- Galerie Schüppenhauer, Cologne
- Galerie Volkmann, Münster
- Private collections home and abroad

=== Important exhibitions ===
- 1960 Confrontation II, studio of Aleš Veselý, Prague
- 1967 Mostra d´arte contemporanea cecoslovacca, Castello del Valentino, Turin
- 1968 Phases: Une Internationale Révolutionnaire de l'Art Contemporain, Lille
- 1968 Künstlergruppe arche mit 10 Malern aus Prag, Hameln, Dortmund
- 1968/1969 La revue et le mouvement Phases, Montmaur, Jihlava, Hradec Králové, Brno
- 1969 Sept jeunes peintres tchécoslovaques, Galerie Lambert, Paris
- 1975 Tschechische Künstler, Düsseldorf
- 1978 Pittura céca contemporanea, Palazzo del Monte, Padua
- 1980 Zeitgenössische Kunst aus der Tschechoslowakei, Konstanz
- 1989 Suvreme Čehoslovačko slikarstvo, Zagreb
- 1991 Europäische Dialogue 1991 / 1. festival Des Europäischen Kulturklubs, Museum Bochum
- 1991 Český informel. Průkopníci abstrakce z let 1957-1964 / Czech Art Informel. Pioneers of abstraction in 1957–1964, Prague
- 1991/1992 K.Š. The Crusaders’ School of Pure Humour Without a Joke, Praha, Hradec Králové, Ostrava, Olomouc (2013 Pardubice, Brno)
- 1992 Arte contemporanea ceca e slovacca 1950 - 1992, Palazzo del Broletto, Novara
- 1992/2003 Minisalon, Prague, Mons, Hollywood, Cincinnati, New York, Indianapolis, Rapids, Albuquerque, Chicago, Columbia, North Dartmouth, Saint Petersburg, Fort Myers, Brussels, Jakarta, Ubud, Surabaya, Paris
- 1996 Zbyšek Sion: Obrazy / Paintings 1958 - 1996, Galerie Rudolfinum, Praha
- 1996/1997 Umění zastaveného času / Art when time stood still (Česká výtvarná scéna 1969-1985), Prague, Brno, Cheb
- 2001 100+1 Art Works of the Twentieth Century, Dům U Černé Matky Boží, Prague
- 2004/2006 Šedesátá / The Sixties (from the collection of Zlatá husa Gallery in Prague), Brno, Karlovy Vary
- 2008 Czech and Slovac Art of the Sixties, Trenčín, Liptovský Mikuláš, Zlín, Ostrava
- 2015 Einfach phantastisch!, Barockschloss Riegersburg, Riegersburg
- 2018/2019 The Anatomy of a Leap into the Void: The Year 1968 and Art in Czechoslovakia, Plzeň, Museum Kampa, Prague

== Sources ==
=== Catalogues and CDs ===
- 2004 Zbyšek Sion: Práce na papíře 1955 - 1963, Galerie ztichlá klika, Praha
- 2000 Zbyšek Sion: Ve sbírce moderního umění poličské galerie, Městské muzeum a galerie Polička
- 1996 Zbyšek Sion: Obrazy 1958 - 1996, Gema Art Group, spol. s.r.o., Praha,
- 1994 Zbyšek Sion: Rané kresby, Galerie '60/´70, Praha,
- 1993 Zbyšek Sion: Obrazy 1958 - 1993, Galerie moderního umění v Roudnici nad Labem
- 1990 Zbyšek Sion, Městské muzeum a galerie Polička
- Zbyšek Sion: Švarná návštěva, 2003, Hůla Jiří, Sion Zbyšek, CD ROM

=== Books ===
- Šmejkal František, Fantasijní aspekty současného českého umění, Oblastní galerie Vysočiny v Jihlavě, 1967
- Bénamou Geneviève, L'art aujourd´hui en Tchecoslovaquie, Geneviève Bénamou, Paříž, 1979
- Anděl Jaroslav a kol., Informel: Sborník symposia, 1991, sborník 71 s., Akademie výtvarných umění (archiv), Praha
- Nešlehová Mahulena, Český informel, Průkopníci abstrakce z let 1957–1964, 268 s., Galerie hlavního města Prahy, SGVU Litoměřice, 1991
- Pečinková Pavla, Contemporary Czech Painting, G+B Arts International Limited, East Roseville, 1993, pp. 138–141
- Chalupecký Jindřich, Nové umění v Čechách, Nakladatelství a vydavatelství H&H, s.r.o., Jinočany, 1994
- Bregant Michal a kol., Ohniska znovuzrození (České umění 1956 - 1963), Galerie hlavního města Prahy 1994, ISBN 807010029X
- Šmejkal František, České imaginativní umění, Galerie Rudolfinum, Praha 1996
- Petr Nedoma, Antonín Hartmann: Zbyšek Sion, Obrazy 1958–1996, 124 pp., Galerie Rudolfinum, Gema Art, Praha 1996, ISBN 80-9014-253-2
- Nešlehová Mahulena (ed), Poselství jiného výrazu: Pojetí informelu v českém umění 50. a první poloviny 60. let, 286 pp., Artefact, Praha, BASE, 1997, ISBN 80-902481-0-1 (BASE), 80-902160-0-5 (ARetFACT)
- Junek David, Konečný Stanislav, Dějiny města Poličky, Argo 2015, ISBN 9788025714577, p. 537, 546

=== Articles ===
- Petr Wittlich, Barokní lekce, Výtvarné umění 1990, č. 6, s. 1–9.
