= List of the most popular names in the 2000s in the United States =

These are the most popular given names of newborns in the United States for all years of the 2000s.

	2000	2001	2002	2003	2004	2005	2006	2007	2008	2009	Last change
Male											
1	Jacob	Jacob	Jacob	Jacob	Jacob	Jacob	Jacob	Jacob	Jacob	Jacob	Steady
2	Michael	Michael	Michael	Michael	Michael	Michael	Michael	Michael	Michael	Ethan	▲
3	Matthew	Matthew	Joshua	Joshua	Joshua	Joshua	Joshua	Ethan	Ethan	Michael	▼
4	Joshua	Joshua	Matthew	Matthew	Matthew	Matthew	Ethan	Joshua	Joshua	Alexander	▲
5	Christopher	Christopher	Ethan	Andrew	Ethan	Ethan	Matthew	Daniel	Daniel	William	▲
6	Nicholas	Nicholas	Andrew	Joseph	Andrew	Andrew	Daniel	Christopher	Alexander	Joshua	▼
7	Andrew	Andrew	Joseph	Ethan	Daniel	Daniel	Christopher	Anthony	Anthony	Daniel	▼
8	Joseph	Joseph	Christopher	Daniel	William	Anthony	Andrew	William	William	Jayden	▲
9	Daniel	Daniel	Nicholas	Christopher	Joseph	Christopher	Anthony	Matthew	Christopher	Noah	▲
10	Tyler	William	Daniel	Anthony	Christopher	Joseph	William	Andrew	Matthew	Christopher	▼
Female											
1	Emily	Emily	Emily	Emily	Emily	Emily	Emily	Emily	Emma	Isabella	▲
2	Hannah	Madison	Madison	Emma	Emma	Emma	Emma	Isabella	Isabella	Emma	▼
3	Madison	Hannah	Hannah	Madison	Madison	Madison	Madison	Emma	Emily	Olivia	▲
4	Ashley	Ashley	Emma	Hannah	Olivia	Abigail	Isabella	Ava	Madison	Sophia	▲
5	Sarah	Alexis	Alexis	Olivia	Hannah	Olivia	Ava	Madison	Ava	Ava	Steady
6	Alexis	Sarah	Ashley	Abigail	Abigail	Isabella	Abigail	Sophia	Olivia	Emily	▼
7	Samantha	Samantha	Abigail	Alexis	Isabella	Hannah	Olivia	Olivia	Sophia	Madison	▼
8	Jessica	Abigail	Sarah	Ashley	Ashley	Samantha	Hannah	Abigail	Abigail	Abigail	Steady
9	Taylor	Elizabeth	Samantha	Elizabeth	Samantha	Ava	Sophia	Hannah	Elizabeth	Chloe	▲
10	Elizabeth	Olivia	Olivia	Samantha	Elizabeth	Ashley	Samantha	Elizabeth	Chloe	Mia	▲

== See also ==
- Popularity of birth names for females (United States)
