= Kleber Janke =

Brazilian footballer

Kleber Lapa
Personal information
- Full name: Kleber Janke
- Date of birth: April 12, 1988 (age 38)
- Place of birth: Lapa, Paraná, Brazil
- Height: 1.73 m (5 ft 8 in)
- Position: Defensive midfielder

Team information
- Current team: Paraná

Youth career
- 2005–2006: Paraná

Senior career*
Years	Team	Apps	(Gls)
2007	Paraná		
- * Club domestic league appearances and goals

Kleber Janke or simply Kleber Lapa (born April 12, 1988 in Lapa), is a Brazilian defensive midfielder. He currently plays for Paraná.

== Contract ==
- 1 August 2006 to 31 January 2009
