= Sion (name) =

Sion is a name used in Wales and in other nations.

== Welsh name ==
Siôn (Welsh pronunciation: [ʃoːn]) or Sion is a Welsh form of the Anglo-Norman Jean, pronounced in English similarly to the Irish name Seán.

Notable people with the Welsh name include:

=== People with the surname ===
- Eleri Siôn (born 1971), Welsh radio and television presenter
- Llywelyn Siôn (1540–c. 1615), Welsh-language poet
- Sawnder Sion (16th century), Welsh poet
- Delwyn Sion (born 1954), welsh singer-songwriter, director, and BAFTA nominee.

=== People with the given name ===
- Siôn ap Hywel (fl. c. 1490–1532), Welsh-language poet
- Sion Bebb (born 1968), Welsh golfer
- Sion Blythe (1781–1835), American pastor
- Sion Record Bostick (1819–1902), American soldier
- Siôn Bradford (1706–1785), Welsh-language poet
- Sion Brinn (born 1973), Jamaican swimmer and coach
- Siôn Cent (c. 1400–1435/40), Welsh-language poet
- Siôn Ceri (fl. early 16th century), Welsh-language poet
- Sion James (born 2002), American basketball player
- Sion Jones (cyclist) (born 1979), Welsh cyclist
- Sion L. Perry (c. 1793–1874), justice of the Supreme Court of Alabama
- Sion Russell Jones (born 1986), Welsh singer and songwriter
- Sion Morris (born 1977), Welsh cricketer
- Siôn Phylip (1543–1620), Welsh-language poet
- Sion Hart Rogers (1825–1874), American politician from North Carolina
- Siôn Simon (born 1968), British politician from Birmingham Erdington
- Sion Spence (born 2000), Welsh footballer
- Siôn Cowdy (born 1997), Irish 7s rugby player
- Siôn Treredyn or John Edwards (c. 1605–1656), Welsh priest and translator
- Siôn Tudur or John Tudur (c. 1522–1602), Welsh-language poet

=== Fictional and mythical characters ===
- Siôn Corn, Welsh name of Father Christmas
- Twm Siôn Cati or Welsh Wizard, Welsh figure in folklore

== Other versions of Sion ==
People with the name "Sion" other than the Welsh name include:

=== People with the given name ===
- Sion Assidon (1948–2025), Moroccan human rights activist
- Sion Sono (born 1961), Japanese filmmaker and poet

=== People with the surname ===
- Constantin Sion, Moldavian chronicler
- Gheorghe Sion, Moldavian and Romanian poet and playwright
- Ioan Sion, Romanian general
- Maurice Sion (1927–2018), American-Canadian mathematician, known for Sion's minimax theorem
- Zbyšek Sion (1938–2025), Czech painter and printmaker
- Ion Theodorescu-Sion, Romanian painter

=== Fictional characters ===
- Sion Eltnam Atlasia, a character in the dōjin soft fighter series Melty Blood
- Darth Sion, a character in the video game Star Wars: Knights of the Old Republic II: The Sith Lords
- Sion, the Undead Juggernaut, a playable champion character in the video game League of Legends
- Sion Todo, a character in the Japanese anime and arcade game PriPara
- Sion Barzahd, a character in The Bouncer (video game)

== See also ==
- Sean
- John (name)
- Shion, a name
- Shôn, given name
