= Ioan =

Other names
- Related names: Eoin, Evan, Giovanni, Hans, Juan, Hovhannes, Ian, Ioane, Ioannis, Ivan, Iven, Ifan, Jack, Jackson, Jan, Jane, Janez, Jean, Jhon, Joan, John, João, Johan /Johann, Johanan, Johannes, Jovan, Juhani, Seán, Shane, Siôn, Yahya, Younan, Yonan, Yohannes

Ioan is a variation on the name John found in Aromanian, Romanian, Bulgarian, Russian, Welsh (Welsh pronunciation: [ˈjo.an]), and Sardinian. It is usually masculine. The female equivalent in Romanian and Bulgarian is Ioana. In Russia, the name Ioann is usually reserved for the clergy (when a person called Ivan becomes a priest or a monk, he becomes known as Ioann). In all Bulgarian and Welsh versions of the Bible, Ioan is the name used for individuals known as John in English translations, such as John the Evangelist and John the Baptist.

People with the name include:

== Rulers ==
- Ioan or Ivan Asen I (died 1196), Tsar of Bulgaria
- Ioan Asen II, Tsar of Bulgaria (1218–1241), son of the above
- Ioan II of Bulgaria, Tsar of Bulgaria (1298-1299)
- John III the Terrible (Romanian: Ioan Vodă cel Cumplit) (1521–1574), Voivode of Moldavia
- John Theodore Callimachi (Romanian: Ioan Teodor Callimachi) (1690–1780), Prince of Moldavia
- John Caradja (pre-modern Romanian: Ioan Gheorghe Caragea) (1754–1844), Prince of Wallachia
- Iacob Heraclid (1527–1563), Prince of Moldavia, named Ioan in some documents
- Ioan Joldea, briefly Prince of Moldavia in 1552
- Ioan Sturdza (1762–1842), ruler of Moldavia

== A ==
- Ioan Alexandru (1941–2000), Romanian poet
- Ioan Almășan (born 1962), Romanian former football goalkeeper and manager
- Ioan Andone (born 1960), Romanian football manager and former player
- Ioan Apostol (born 1959), Romanian luger
- Ioan Auer (1902–?), Romanian footballer

== B ==
- Ioan Baba (born 1951), Romanian poet
- Ioan A. Bassarabescu (1870–1952), Romanian writer and politician
- Ioan Bengliu (1881–1940), Romanian lieutenant-general
- Ioan Bob (1739–1830), Romanian Greek Catholic Church bishop and primate
- Ioan Bogdan (footballer) (born 1956), Romanian footballer
- Ioan Bogdan (historian) (1864–1919), Romanian historian and philologist
- Ioan Borcea (1879–1936), Romanian zoologist
- Ioan Boeriu (1859–1949), Austrian-born ethnic Romanian Austro-Hungarian general
- Ion C. Brătianu (1821–1891), Romanian politician and writer, Prime Minister of Romania
- Ion I. C. Brătianu (1864–1927), Romanian politician, five-time Prime Minister of Romania, Foreign Minister, son of the above

== C ==
- Ioan Cantacuzino (1863–1934), Romanian physician and microbiologist
- Ioan or Ion C. Cantacuzino (politician) (1825–1878), Romanian politician and Minister of Justice
- Ioan Carlaonț (1885–1952), Romanian World War II major general and post-war anti-communist resistance leader
- Ioan Chirilă (1925–1999), Romanian sports broadcaster and sports writer
- Ioan Mihai Cochinescu (born 1951), Romanian novelist and essayist
- Ioan Condruc (born 1951), Romanian former footballer
- Ion Creangă (jurist) (born 1962), Moldovan jurist
- Ion Creangă (politician) (born 1883), Bessarabian politician
- Ioan Croft (born 2001), Welsh boxer
- Ioan Culcer (1853–1928), Wallachian-born Romanian general and politician, Minister for Public Works
- Ioan Petru Culianu (1950–1991), Romanian historian and philosopher
- Ioan Cunningham (born 1983), Welsh rugby union coach and former player

== D ==
- Ioan Davies (born 1999), Welsh rugby union player
- Ioan Dicezare (1916–2012), Romanian fighter ace in World War II
- Ioan Donca (1940–2025), Romanian diplomat
- Ioan Drăgan (1965–2012), Romanian footballer
- Ioan Dumitrache (1889–1977), Romanian major general during World War II
- Ioan Dzițac (1953–2021), Romanian professor of mathematics and computer science

== E ==
- Ioan Evans (politician) (1927–1984), Welsh politician
- Ioan Evans (rugby union) (born 2001), Welsh rugby union player

== F ==
- Ioan Filip (born 1989), Romanian footballer
- Ioan Fiscuteanu (1937–2007), Romanian actor
- Ioan Florariu (born 1979), Romanian retired rower
- Ioan Emanoil Florescu (1819–1893), Romanian general, twice briefly Prime Minister of Romania
- Ioan Flueraș (1882–1953), Romanian politician

== G ==
- Ioan Gherghel (born 1978), Romanian retired swimmer
- Ioan Grigoraș (born 1963), Romanian retired Greco-Roman wrestler
- Ioan Grillo, English journalist and writer
- Ioan Gruffudd (born 1973), Welsh actor

== H ==
- Ioan Halmoș (1901–?), Romanian footballer
- Ioan Holender (born 1935), Romanian-born Austrian operatic baritone and administrator
- Ioan Hora (born 1988), Romanian footballer
- Ioan Horga, Romanian professor of international relations and European studies and dean
- Ioan Hristea, Romanian World War II officer

== I ==
- Ioan Igna (born 1940), Romanian football referee and former player

== J ==
- Ioan James (1928–2025), British mathematician
- Ioan Jones (born 2004), English rugby union player

== K ==
- Ioan Kiss (1901–2006), Romanian football goalkeeper
- Ioan Kramer (born 1962), Romanian former footballer

== L ==
- Ioan Lahovary (1844–1915), Romanian a politician, diplomat and Minister of Foreign Affairs
- Ioan Lemeni (1780–1861), Hungarian ethnic Romanian prelate, bishop of Făgăraş and primate of the Romanian Greek Catholic Church
- Ioan Lewis (1930–2014), Scottish professor of anthropology
- Ioan Lloyd (born 2001), Welsh rugby union player
- Ioan Lupaș (1880–1967), Romanian historian, academic, politician, Orthodox theologian and priest
- Ioan Lupescu (born 1968), Romanian former footballer

== M ==
- Ioan Manu (1803–1874), Romanian politician
- Ioan Mărginean (born 1960), Romanian former footballer
- I. C. Massim (1825–1877), Romanian linguist and a founding member of the Romanian Academy
- Ioan Inocențiu Micu-Klein (1692–1768), Romanian Greek Catholic Church bishop and primate
- Ioan Mirea (1912–1987), Romanian artist and member of the fascist Iron Guard
- Ioan Miszti (born 1969), Romanian footballer
- Ioan T. Morar (born 1956), Romanian journalist, poet, dramatist, novelist and literary and art critic
- Ioan Moța (1868–1940), Romanian Orthodox priest, politician and journalist

== N ==
- Ioan Nagy (born 1954), Romanian former footballer
- Ioan Neag (born 1994), Romanian footballer
- Ioan Nicholas (born 1998), Welsh rugby union player
- Ioan Nicolidi of Pindus (1737–1828), Ottoman Empire-born ethnic Armenian physician and noble

== O ==
- Ioan Oteteleșanu (1795–1876), Wallachian, later Romanian businessman and politician, Audit Minister and briefly Finance Minister

== P ==
- Ioan Gyuri Pascu (1961–2016), Romanian musician, actor and comedian
- Ioan Mircea Pașcu (born 1949), Romanian politician
- Ioan Petcu (born 1959), Romanian retired footballer
- Ioan Pop (born 1954), Romanian fencer
- Ioan Popovici (brigadier general) (1865–1953), Romanian general
- Ioan Popovici (divisional general) (1857–?), Romanian general
- Ioan Popovici-Bănățeanul (1869–1893), Romanian poet
- Ivan Pidkova (Ukrainian: Ioan Potcoavă) (died 1578), Hetman of Ukrainian Cossacks
- Ioan Prundeanu (born 1993), Romanian rower
- Ioan Pușcaș (1932–2015), Romanian gastroenterologist and medical pioneer

== R ==
- Ioan Mihail Racoviță (1889–1954), Romanian World War II general and Minister of Defense
- Ioan Rășcanu (1878–1952), Romanian World War I general, politician and Minister of War
- Ioan Bowen Rees (1929–1999), Welsh poet, mountaineer and civil servant
- Ioan Robu (born 1944), Romanian prelate of the Roman Catholic Church and former Archbishop of Bucharest
- Ioan Rus (born 1955), Romanian politician, twice Interior Minister and once Transport Minister

== S ==
- Ioan Sabău (born 1968), Romanian football manager and former player
- Ioan Sărac (1949–2021), Romanian football player and manager
- Ioan Sârca (1911–1991), Romanian serial killer and rapist
- Ioan Sauca (born 1956), Romanian Orthodox priest, theologian, and Secretary General of the World Council of Churches
- Ioan Sdrobiș (born 1946), Romanian former football manager
- Ioan Axente Sever (1821–1906), Romanian revolutionary in Austria-Hungary
- Ioan Simu (1875–1948) was an Austro-Hungarian-born Romanian Greek-Catholic priest and politician
- Ioan Sion (1890–1942), Romanian major general
- Ioan Șișeștean (1936–2011), Romanian prelate and bishop of the Greek Catholic Church
- Ioan Slavici (1848–1925), Romanian writer and journalist from Austria-Hungary
- Ioan Șnep (born 1966), Romanian retired rower
- Ioan Ștefănescu or Ion Creangă (1837–1889), Moldavian, later Romanian writer and raconteur
- Ioan Sterca-Șuluțiu (1796–1858), Austrian ethnic Romanian military leader
- Ioan Străjescu (1833–1873), Romanian politician and a founding member of the Romanian Academy
- Ioan Suciu (1907–1953), Romanian bishop of the Greek Catholic Church
- Ioan Silviu Suciu (born 1977), Romanian retired artistic gymnast
- Ioan Suciu (footballer) (1933–2018), Romanian footballer

== T ==
- Ioan Talpeș (born 1944), Romanian army general, military historian and politician
- Ioan Tegid, bardic name of Welsh clergyman and writer John Jones (1792–1852)
- Ioan Țepelea (1949–2012), Romanian writer
- Ioan Tesler (1903–1942), Romanian footballer

== V ==
- Ioan Vancea (1820—1892), Austro-Hungarian ethnic Romanian bishop of the Greek Catholic Church
- Ioan Varga (born 1959), Romanian former footballer
- Ioan Vințe or Ion Vincze (1910–1996), Romanian communist politician and diplomat

== Y ==
- Ioan Yakovlev (born 1998), Estonian footballer

== Z ==
- Ioan Zalomit (1823–1885), Romanian philosopher, professor and rector of the University of Bucharest

== See also ==
- Ion, Ionel, Ionuț, other Romanian variations
- Yoan, a list of people with the given name

Other Welsh variations:

- Ifan (given name)
- Ieuan
- Ianto
- Siôn
