= Ioana =

Ioana or Oana is a female given name of Romanian origin. It is the equivalent of the English name Joan, and the male version John, all of which derive from the Hebrew name Yohanan. A common diminutive is Ionela.

People with this name include:

== Ioana ==
- Ioana Maria Aluaș (born 1975), Romanian Olympic judoka
- Ioana Badea (born 1964), Romanian rower
- Ioana Bortan (born 1989), Romanian footballer
- Ioana Bulcă (1936–2025), Romanian actress
- Ioana Ciolacu (born 1982), Romanian fashion designer
- Ioana Crăciunescu (born 1950), Romanian actress and poet
- Ioana Diaconescu (born 1979), Romanian freestyle swimmer
- Ioana Flora (born 1975), Romanian actress
- Ioana Gașpar (born 1983), Romanian tennis player
- Ioana Mihalache (born 1990), Romanian actress and beauty pageant titleholder
- Ioana Raluca Olaru (born 1989), Romanian tennis player
- Ioana Olteanu (born 1966), Romanian rower
- Ioana Papuc (born 1984), Romanian rower
- Ioana Pârvulescu (born 1960), Romanian writer
- Ioana Petcu-Colan (born 1978), Irish musician
- Ioana Petrescu (born 1980), Romanian economist
- Ioana Rudăreasa, Wallachian Romani woman
- Ioana Stănciulescu (born 2004), Romanian artistic gymnast
- Ioana Strungaru (née Crăciun; born 1989), Romanian rower
- Ioana Tudoran (born 1948), Romanian rower

== Oana ==
- Oana Andrei, Romanian beauty pageant titleholder
- Oana Ban (born 1986), Romanian gymnast
- Oana Chirilă (born 1981), Romanian handball player
- Oana Corina Constantin (born 1991), Romanian aerobic gymnast
- Oana Gregory (born 1996), Romanian actress and model
- Oana Manea (born 1985), Romanian female handballer
- Oana Niculescu-Mizil (born 1975), Romanian politician
- Oana Pantelimon (born 1972), Romanian high jumper
- Oana Paveluc (born 1991), Romanian beauty pageant contestant
- Oana Pellea (born 1962), Romanian actress
- Oana Petrovschi (born 1986), Romanian gymnast
- Oana Țoiu (born 1985), Romanian politician

== See also ==
- Ioan
- Ion
- Ionel
