= Consulate =

Official office of one country in another country

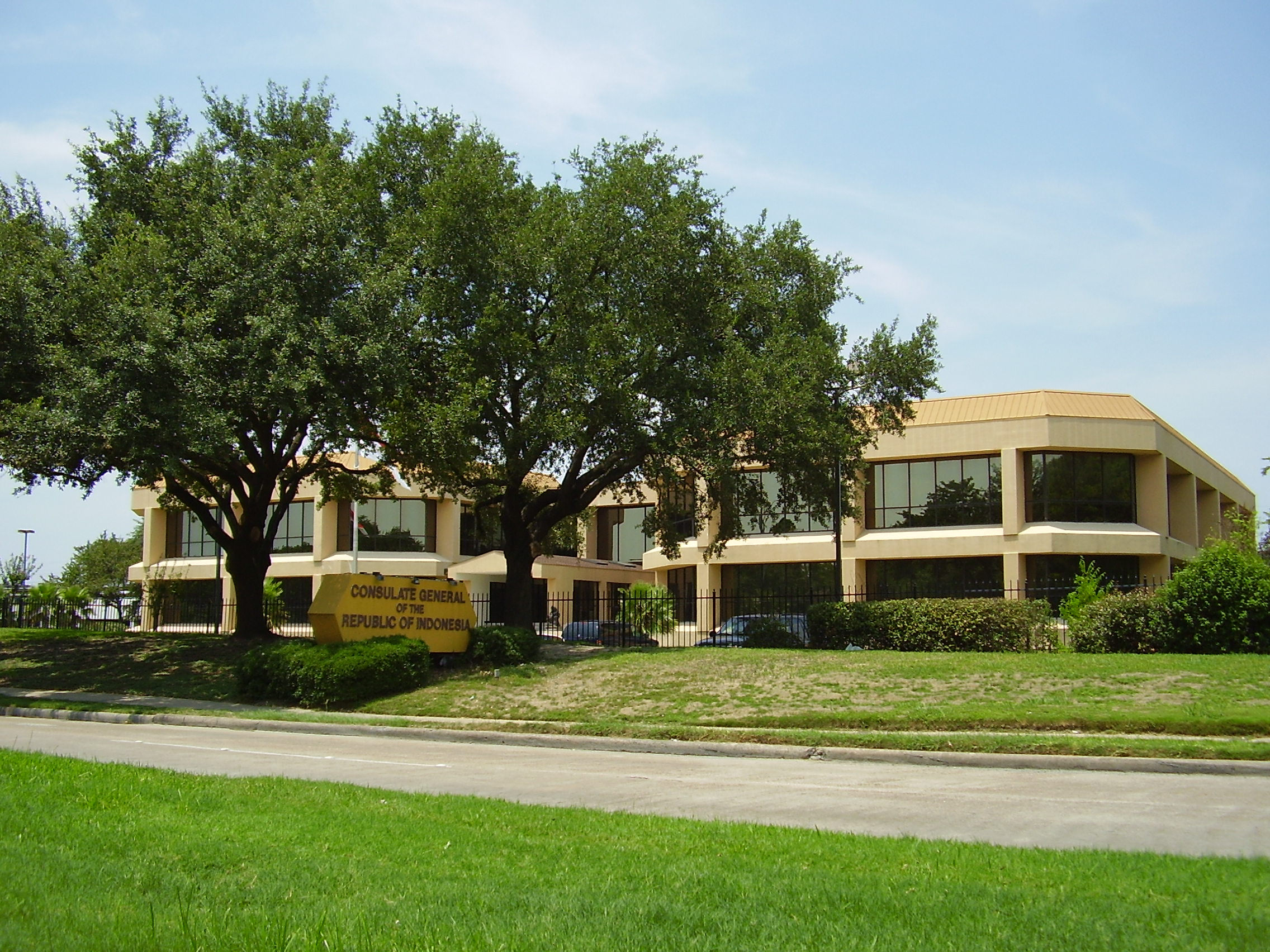
Consulate-General of Indonesia in Houston, Texas, United States

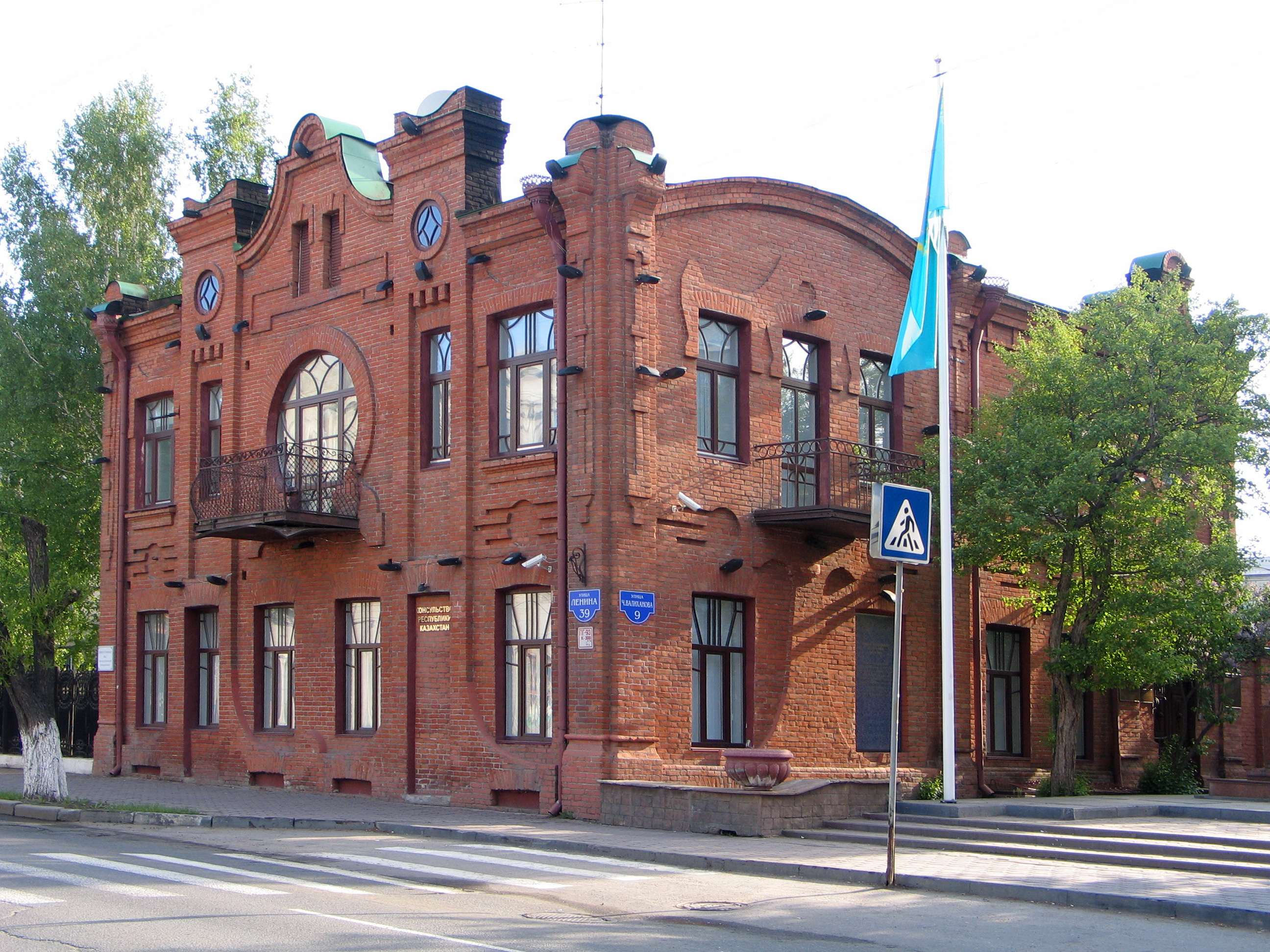
Consulate of Kazakhstan in Omsk, Russia

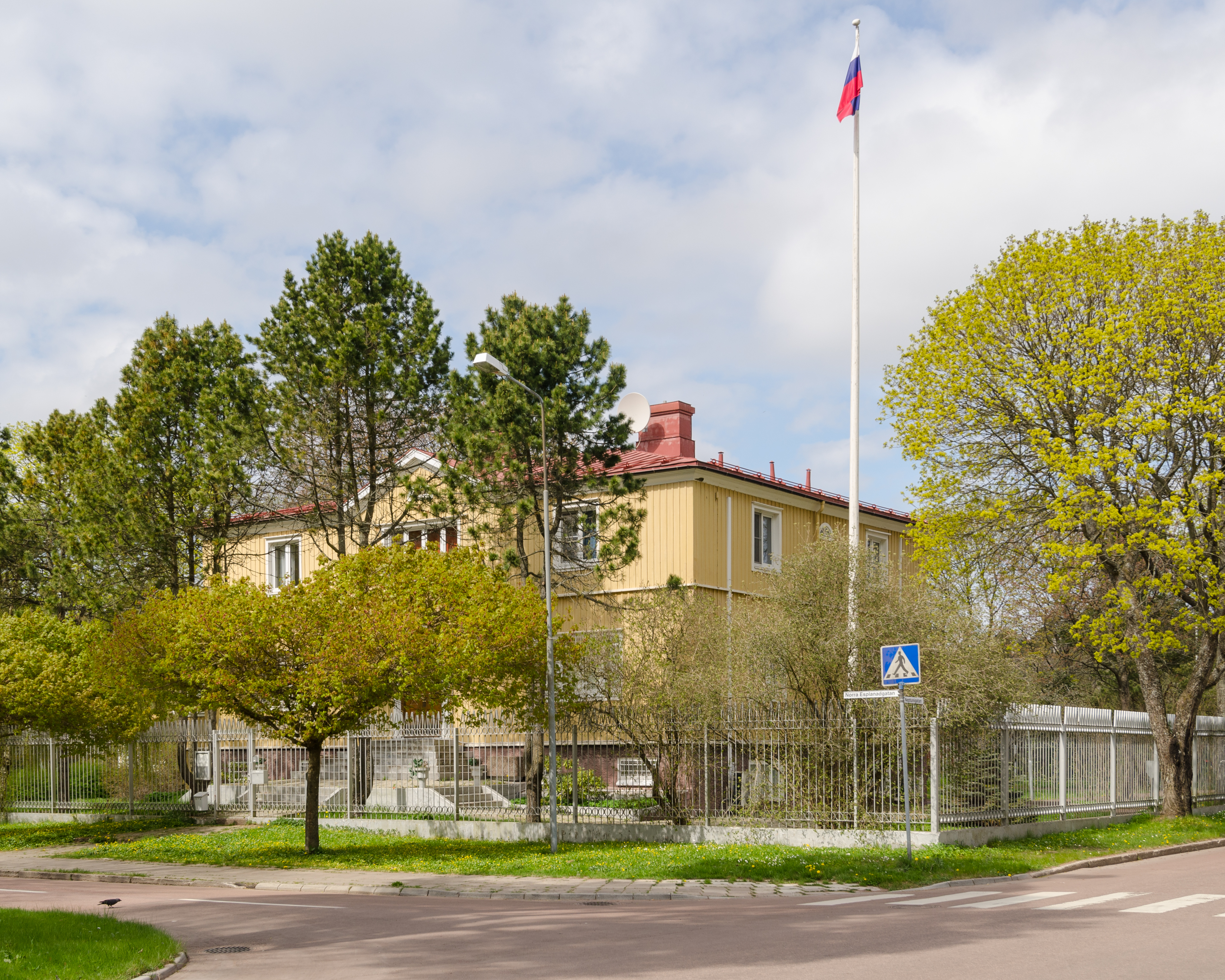
Consulate of Russia in Mariehamn, Åland

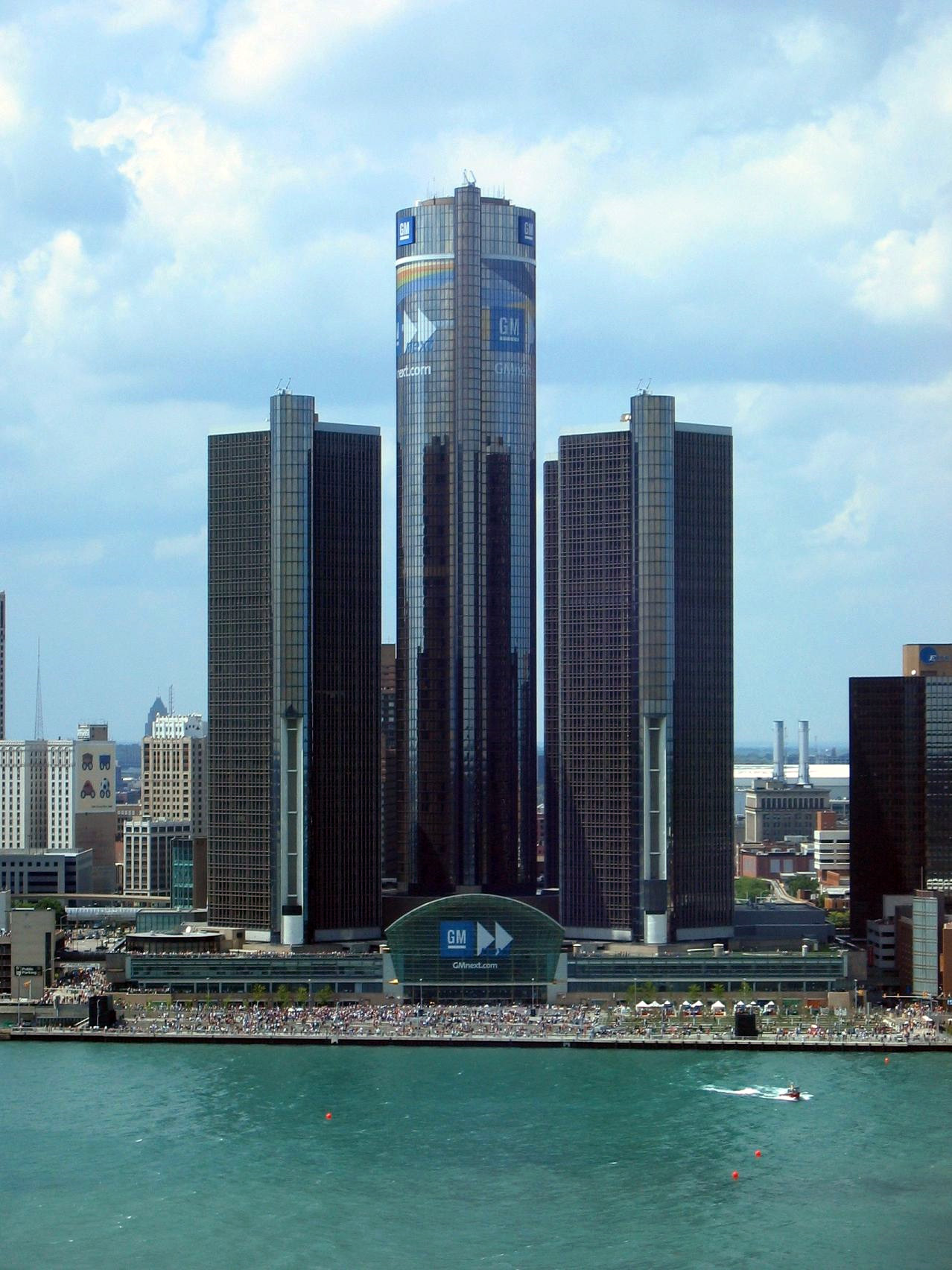
Consulate-General of Japan in Detroit at the Renaissance Center in Detroit, Michigan, United States

A consulate is the office of a consul. A type of mission, it is usually subordinate to the state's main representation in the capital of that foreign country (host state), usually an embassy (or, only between two Commonwealth countries, a high commission). The term "consulate" may refer not only to the office of a consul, but also to the building occupied by the consul and the consul's staff. The consulate primarily serves its visiting nationals to the region in which it is based, and prospective visitors, commercial entities, or regional governments, who wish access or connections to the consulate's home country. There is usually also consular services in the capital too, and in those cases, the consulate may share premises with the embassy itself.

== Consular rank ==
A consul of the highest rank is termed a consul-general and is appointed to a consulate-general. There are typically one or more deputy consuls-general, consuls, vice-consuls, and consular agents working under the consul-general. A country may appoint more than one consul-general to another nation.

== Authority and activities ==
Consuls of various ranks may have specific legal authority for certain activities, such as notarizing documents. As such, diplomatic personnel with other responsibilities may receive consular letters patent (commissions). Aside from those outlined in the Vienna Convention on Diplomatic Relations, there are few formal requirements outlining what a consular official must do. For example, for some countries, consular officials may be responsible for the issue of visas; other countries may limit "consular services" to providing assistance to compatriots, legalization of documents, etc. Nonetheless, consulates proper will be headed by consuls of various ranks, even if such officials have little or no connection with the more limited sense of consular service.

Activities of a consulate include protecting the interests of their citizens temporarily or permanently resident in the host country, issuing passports; issuing visas to foreigners and public diplomacy. Although it is not admitted publicly, consulates, like embassies, may also gather intelligence information from the assigned country.

=== Consular districts ===
A consular district is a sub-national region designated by a consular post to exercise consular functions in a host country. A consular district is serviced by a consul or "consul-general" and is headquartered at a consulate or "consulate-general." It is a common utility for spreading diplomatic representation and services to regions of a host country beyond a guest country's embassy in the capital.

== Role in diplomatic missions ==
Staff of consulates may be career diplomats, but they have limited forms of diplomatic immunity unless they are also accredited as such. Immunities and privileges for consuls and accredited staff of consulates (consular immunity) are generally limited to actions undertaken in their official capacity and, with respect to the consulate itself, to those required for official duties. In practice, the extension and application of consular privileges and immunities can differ widely from country to country.

Consulates are more numerous than other diplomatic missions, such as embassies. Ambassadors are posted only in a foreign nation's capital (but exceptionally outside the country, as in the case of a multiple mandate; e.g., a minor power may accredit a single ambassador with several neighbouring states of modest relative importance that are not considered important allies).

Consuls are posted in a nation's capital, and in other cities throughout that country, especially centres of economic activity and cities where large populations of citizens from the consul's home country reside (expatriates). In the United States, for example, embassies are located in Washington D.C. and most countries have a consulate-general in New York City (the site of the headquarters of the United Nations), and some have consulates-general in several major cities, such as Atlanta, Boston, Chicago, Dallas, Houston, Los Angeles, Miami, or San Francisco. Many countries have multiple consular offices in nations such as Germany, Russia, Canada, Brazil, and Australia.

Consulates are subordinate posts of their home country's diplomatic mission (typically an embassy, in the capital city of the host country). Diplomatic missions are established in international law under the Vienna Convention on Diplomatic Relations, while consulates-general and consulates are established in international law under the Vienna Convention on Consular Relations. Formally, at least within the US system, the consular career (ranking in descending order: consul-general, consul, vice-consul, honorary consul) forms a different hierarchy from the diplomats in the strict sense. However, it is common for individuals to be transferred from one hierarchy to the other, and for consular officials to serve in a capital carrying out strictly consular duties within the consular section of a diplomatic post; e.g., within an embassy.

Between Commonwealth countries, both diplomatic and consular activities may be undertaken by a High Commission in the capital, although larger Commonwealth nations generally also have consulates and consulates-general in major cities. For example, Toronto in Canada, Sydney in Australia and Auckland, New Zealand, are of greater economic importance than their respective national capitals, hence the need for consulates there.

=== Hong Kong ===
When Hong Kong was under British administration, diplomatic missions of Commonwealth countries, such as Canada, Australia, New Zealand, India, Malaysia, and Singapore were known as commissions. After the transfer of sovereignty to China in 1997, they were renamed consulates-general, with the last commissioner becoming consul-general. However, the Australian commission had been renamed the consulate-general in 1986.

Owing to Hong Kong's status as a special administrative region of China, some countries' consulates-general in Hong Kong report directly to their respective foreign ministries, rather than to their embassies in Beijing, such as those of Canada, the United Kingdom and United States.
