= Ionuț =

Ionuț is a Romanian masculine given name. The English equivalent is Johnny. Notable persons with that name include:

- Ionuț Andrei (born 1985), Romanian bobsledder
- Ionuț Badea (born 1975), Romanian footballer
- Ionuț Bălan (born 1978), Romanian footballer
- Ionuț Bâlbă (born 1981), Romanian footballer
- Ionuț Dimofte (born 1984), Romanian rugby union footballer
- Ionuț Dobroiu (born 1988), Romanian footballer
- Ionuț Dragomir (born 1974), Romanian footballer
- Ionuț Florea (born 1980), Romanian futsal player
- Ionuț Gheorghe (born 1984), Romanian boxer
- Ionuț Iftimoaie (born 1978), Romanian kickboxer
- Ionuț Dan Ion (born 1981), Romanian professional boxer
- Ionuț Irimia (born 1979), Romanian professional footballer
- Ionuț Lupescu (born 1968), Romanian footballer
- Ionuț Mazilu (born 1982), Romanian footballer
- Ionuț Popa (1953–2020), Romanian footballer and coach
- Ionuț Radu (born 1997), Romanian footballer
- Ionuț Cristian Stancu (born 1983), Romanian footballer
- Ionuț Stănescu (born 1979), Romanian handballer
- Ionuț Țăran (born 1987), Romanian luger

== See also ==
- Ioan
- Ion (name)
- Ionel
