= Ionescu =

Ionescu (Francisized as Ionesco or Jonesco) is a Romanian language patronymic surname, derived from the male given name Ion. It may refer to:

== Ionescu ==
- Alexandru Ionescu, bobsledder
- Alexandru Ionescu, socialist militant
- Cassius Ionescu-Tulcea, mathematician
- Claudiu Eugen Ionescu, handball player
- Constantin Al. Ionescu-Caion, journalist
- Constantin Ionescu, chess grandmaster
- Corneliu Ionescu, painter
- Cristian Ionescu, politician
- Eduard Ionescu, table tennis player
- Elisabeta Ionescu, handball player
- Emanoil Ionescu, soldier
- Eugen Ionescu, also Eugène Ionesco, absurdist playwright
- Gheorghe Ionescu, painter
- Gheorghe Ionescu-Sisești, agronomist
- Ilarion Ionescu-Galați, violinist and conductor
- Ion Ionescu-Căpățână, writer and anarchist activist
- Ion Ionescu de la Brad, agronomist and economist
- Marian Ionescu, pioneer cardiac surgeon
- Mircea Ionescu Quintus, politician
- Nae Ionescu, philosopher
- Nicolae Ionescu, politician and academic
- Ovidiu Ionescu, table tennis player
- Raicu Ionescu-Rion, socialist journalist, sociologist and art critic
- Sabrina Ionescu, American basketball player
- Șerban Ionescu, actor
- Silviu Ionescu, diplomat
- Ștefan Ionescu, ice hockey player
- Take Ionescu, politician
- Theodor V. Ionescu, physicist
- Valentin Ionescu, politician
- Valeriu Ionescu, writer, published under the name I. Valerian
- Vali Ionescu, long jumper

== Ionesco/Jonesco ==
- Carmen Ionesco, Canadian discus thrower of Romanian descent
- Eugène Ionesco, playwright
- Eva Ionesco, actress
- Gia Ionesco
- Irina Ionesco, photographer
- Karine Ionesco
- Nicole Jonesco (1923–2008), French actress
- Petrika Ionesco (born 1946), French stage director and playwright

== Others ==
- Sanda Movilă (born Maria Ionescu), novelist
- N. Porsenna (born Nicu Porsena Ionescu), writer and politician
- Urmuz (born Dimitrie Dim. Ionescu-Buzeu), writer
