= Ionel (surname) =

Ionel is a Romanian surname, with Ionel being a given name as well. Notable people with the surname include:

- Dan Mircea Ionel, American electrical engineer, professor
- Eleny Ionel (born 1969), Romanian mathematician
- Nicholas David Ionel (born 2002), Romanian tennis player
- Vasile Ionel (1927–2015), Romanian general
