= Younane =

Younane is a surname. Notable people with the surname include:

- Doris Younane (born 1963), Australian actress
- Paul Younane (born 1960), Australian rugby league football centre

== See also ==
- Younan
