= Ion (name) =

Ion is a masculine given name. The written form corresponds to two names that are different and unrelated in origin.

The first is the Greek name Ἴων (Iōn), after the mythical founder of the Ionians; the modern (demotic) Greek equivalent is Ionas.

The second name is the Romanian Ion which is equivalent to the English name John and has the same etymology as "Jon", all tracing back to the Hebrew Bible name Johanan. Another variant is Ioan, the Romanian name for John the Baptist (Ioan Botezătorul). Common diminutives are Ionel and Ionuț. Its female form is Ioana. The surname Ionescu is derived from Ion. However, Ion can also be a surname in Romanian. The "Ion" spelling is also used as a male forename in the Basque language, again as a cognate of "John" and sometimes used interchangeably with "Jon".

Notable people with the given name Ion include:

- Ion of Chios (c. 490/480–c. 420 BC), Greek writer, dramatist, lyric poet and philosopher
- Ion Agârbiceanu (1882–1963), Romanian writer and priest
- Ion Al-George (1891–1957), Romanian writer
- Ion Ansotegi (born 1982), Spanish footballer
- Ion Andreescu (1850–1882), Romanian painter
- Ion Antonescu (1882–1946), Romanian soldier, authoritarian politician and convicted war criminal
- Ion Aramendi (born 1977), Spanish basketballer
- Ion Barbu (disambiguation)
- Ion C. Brătianu (1821–1891), Romanian statesman
- Ion I. C. Brătianu (1864–1927), Romanian politician, five-term Prime Minister of Romania, son of Ion C. Brătianu
- Ion Budai-Deleanu (1760–1820), Romanian scholar, philologist, historian, and poet
- Ion Călugăru (1902–1956), Romanian novelist, short story writer, journalist and critic
- Ion Luca Caragiale (1852–1912), Wallachian-born Romanian playwright, short story writer, poet, theater manager, political commentator and journalist
- Ion Caramitru (1942–2021), Romanian actor, stage director and politician
- Ion Cernea (1933–2025), Romanian Greco-Roman wrestler
- Ion Codreanu (general) (1891–1960), Romanian general in World War II
- Ion Constantinescu (1896–?), Romanian general in World War II
- Ion Creangă (1837 or 1839–1889), Moldavian, later Romanian writer, raconteur and schoolteacher
- Ion Dolănescu (1944–2009), Romanian singer and politician
- Ion Dragalina (1860–1916), Romanian First World War general
- Ion Dragoumis (1878–1920), Greek diplomat, philosopher, writer and revolutionary
- Ion Druță (born 1928), Moldovan writer
- Ion G. Duca (1879–1933), assassinated Prime Minister of Romania
- Ion Echaide (born 1988), Spanish footballer
- Ion Farris (1878–1934), American politician and attorney
- Ion Foti (1887–1946), Romanian poet
- Ion Garmendia (born 1979), Spanish musician
- Ion Ghica (1816–1897), Romanian revolutionary, mathematician, diplomat and politician, five-time prime minister of Romania
- Ion Gigurtu (1886–1959), Romanian politician, officer, engineer and industrialist, briefly Prime Minister of Romania
- Ion Hamilton, 1st Baron HolmPatrick (1839–1898), Anglo-Irish Member of Parliament
- Ion Llewellyn Idriess (1890–1979), a prolific and influential Australian author
- Ion Iliescu (1930–2025), twice president of Romania
- Ion Inculeț (1884–1940), Bessarabian politician and President of the Moldavian Democratic Republic
- Ion Ionescu de la Brad (1818–1891), born Ion Isăcescu, Moldavian, later Romanian revolutionary, agronomist, statistician, scholar and writer
- Ion Ionuț Luțu (born 1975), Romanian footballer
- Ion Izagirre (born 1989), Spanish cyclist
- Ion Jalea (1887–1983), Romanian sculptor
- Ion Jinga (born 1961), Romanian diplomat
- Ion Luchianov (born 1981), Moldovan athlete
- I. C. Massim (1825–1877), linguist and a founding member of the Romanian Academy
- Ion Gheorghe Maurer (1902–2000), Romanian communist politician and lawyer
- Ion Mihalache (1882–1963), Romanian agrarian politician
- Ion Mincu (1852–1912), Romanian architect, engineer, professor and politician
- Ion Minulescu (1881–1944), Romanian avant-garde poet, writer, journalist, literary critic and playwright
- Ion Miu (born 1955), Romanian musician
- Ion Moța (1902—1937), Romanian nationalist, deputy leader of the Iron Guard
- Ion Negoițescu (1921–1993), Romanian literary historian, critic, poet, novelist and memoirist
- Ion Nistor (1876–1962), Romanian historian and politician
- Ion Ion (footballer) (born 1954), Romanian former footballer
- Ion Mihai Pacepa (1928–2021), Romanian security police three-star general who defected to the United States
- Ion Perdicaris (1840–1925), Greek-American playboy who was the centre of a notable kidnapping known as the Perdicaris incident
- Ion Heliade Rădulescu (1802–1872), Wallachian, later Romanian academic, Romantic and Classicist poet, writer, newspaper editor and politician
- Ion A. Rădulescu-Pogoneanu (1870–1945), Romanian pedagogue
- I. M. Rașcu (1890–1971), Romanian poet, cultural promoter, comparatist and schoolteacher
- Ion Roată (1806–1882), Moldavian, later Romanian peasant and politician
- Ion Sân-Giorgiu (1893–1950), Romanian poet, dramatist, essayist, literary and art critic, journalist, academic and politician
- Ion Dezideriu Sîrbu (1919–1989), Romanian philosopher, novelist, essayist and dramatist
- Ion Șiugariu (1914–1945), Romanian poet
- Ion Tănăsescu (chemist) (1892–1959)
- Ion Tănăsescu (surgeon) (1875–1954)
- Ion Testemițanu (born 1974), Moldovan former footballer and current assistant manager of the Moldovan national football team
- Ion Țiriac (born 1939), Romanian businessman and former tennis player
- Ion Trewin (1943–2015), British editor and author
- Ion Țuculescu (1910–1962), Romanian painter
- Ion Țurai (1907–1970), Romanian surgeon
- Ion Vélez (born 1985), Spanish footballer
- Ion Voinescu (1929–2018), Romanian football goalkeeper

== See also ==
- Ion (surname)
- Ioan (name)
- Ionel (name)
- Ionuț (name)
- Ionescu
- Ionești (disambiguation)
- Ionășeni (disambiguation)
