= Ion (surname) =

Ion is a Romanian surname, with Ion being a given name as well. Notable people with the surname include:

- Adrian Ion (born 1986), Romanian rugby union footballer
- Barry Ion (born 1941), Australian rules footballer and radio personality
- Corneliu Ion (born 1951), Romanian sports shooter and 1980 Olympic champion
- Diana Ana Maria Ion (born 2000), Romanian triple jumper
- Dumitru M. Ion (1948-2022), Romanian writer and translator
- Gheorghe Ion (general) (1923–2009), Romanian army general and communist politician
- Gheorghe Ion (born 1960), Romanian rugby union footballer
- Ion Ion (footballer) (born 1954), Romanian former footballer
- Jo Jo Dan (Ionuț Dan Ion, born 1981), Romanian boxer
- Narcis Dorin Ion (born 1974), Romanian historian
- Patrick Ion (born 1942), American mathematician
- Ruxandra Ion (born 1956), Romanian TV producer
- Sue Ion (born 1955), British engineer, advisor on the nuclear power industry
- Vasile Ion (senator) (1950-2019), Romanian senator
- Vasile Ion (born 1957), Romanian rugby union footballer
- Viorel Ion, Romanian footballer
