= Ionășeni =

Ionășeni may refer to several villages in Romania:

- Ionășeni, a village in Trușești Commune, Botoșani County
- Ionășeni, a village in Vârfu Câmpului Commune, Botoșani County

== See also ==
- Ion (name)
- Ionești (disambiguation)
