= Ionești =

Ionești may refer to several places in Romania:

- Ionești, Gorj, a commune in Gorj County
- Ionești, Vâlcea, a commune in Vâlcea County
- Ionești, a village in Hălmagiu Commune, Arad County
- Ionești, a village in Buzoești Commune, Argeș County
- Ionești, a village in Cireșu Commune, Brăila County
- Ionești, a village in Cața Commune, Brașov County
- Ionești, a village in Petrești Commune, Dâmbovița County

== See also ==
- Ion (name)
- Ionășeni (disambiguation)
