= Diplomatic immunity =

Form of legal immunity and a policy held between governments and tribunals

Example of a diplomatic passport (left) and an official passport (right) from India, both identifying their bearers as representatives of their country

Diplomatic immunity is a principle of international law by which certain foreign government officials are recognized as having legal immunity from the jurisdiction of another country. It allows diplomats safe passage and freedom of travel in a host country, and affords almost total protection from local lawsuits and criminal prosecution.

Diplomatic immunity is one of the oldest and most widespread practices in international relations; most civilizations since antiquity have granted some degree of special status to foreign envoys and messengers. It is designed to facilitate relations between states by allowing their respective representatives to conduct their duties freely and safely, even during periods of political tension and armed conflict. Moreover, such protections are generally understood to be reciprocal and therefore mutually beneficial.

As a longstanding and nearly universal concept, diplomatic immunity has long been considered customary law; however, it was traditionally granted on a bilateral, ad hoc basis, leading to varying and sometimes conflicting standards of protection. Modern practices of diplomatic immunity have largely conformed to the 1961 Vienna Convention on Diplomatic Relations, which formally codified the legal and political status of diplomats, and has been ratified by the vast majority of sovereign states.

Diplomats may be declared persona non grata and expelled, although not prosecuted. A foreign official's home country may waive immunity and allow prosecution, typically if the official was involved in a serious crime unrelated to their diplomatic role (such as vehicular homicide, as opposed to, for example, allegations of spying). However, many countries refuse to waive immunity as a matter of course, and diplomats have no authority to waive their own immunity (except perhaps in cases of defection). Alternatively, the home country may prosecute the diplomat on its own accord or at the behest of the host country.

== History ==
=== Prior to modern period ===
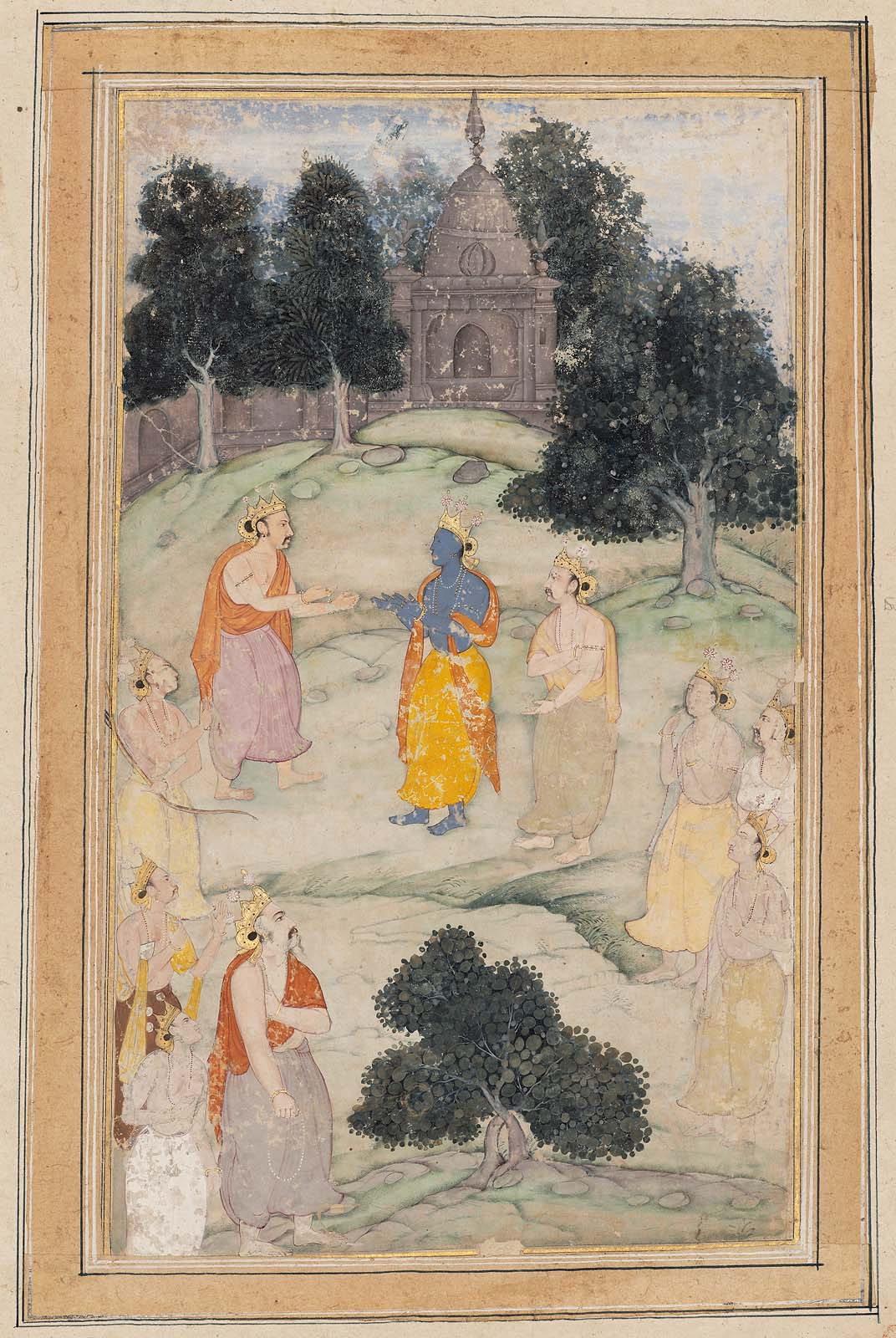
Krishna, an avatar of Vishnu, mediating for peace to avert the Kurukshetra War of Mahabharata

The concept of diplomatic immunity can be found in ancient Indian epics like Ramayana and Mahabharata, where messengers and diplomats were given immunity from capital punishment. In Ramayana, when the demon king Ravana ordered the killing of Hanuman, Ravana's younger brother Vibhishana pointed out that messengers or diplomats should not be killed, as per ancient practices.

During the evolution of international justice, many wars were considered rebellions or unlawful by one or more combatant sides. In such cases, the servants of the "criminal" sovereign were often considered accomplices and their persons violated. In other circumstances, harbingers of inconsiderable demands were killed as a declaration of war. Herodotus records that when heralds of the Persian king Xerxes demanded "earth and water" (i.e., symbols of submission) of Greek cities, the Athenians threw them into a pit and the Spartans threw them down a well for the purpose of suggesting they would find both earth and water at the bottom, these often being mentioned by the messenger as a threat of siege. However, even for Herodotus, this maltreatment of envoys is a crime. He recounts a story of divine vengeance befalling Sparta for this deed.

A Roman envoy was urinated on as he was leaving the city of Tarentum. The oath of the envoy, "This stain will be washed away with blood!", was fulfilled during the Pyrrhic War.

Gregory of Tours recorded that Frankish envoys sent from King Childebert II to the Byzantine emperor Maurice were killed in Carthage by the prefect of the city, after one of the Franks had murdered a merchant. After Emperor Maurice heard about this, he ordered for several Carthaginians to be arrested and sent to Childebert for judgment on account of what happened to his envoys.

The arrest and ill-treatment of the envoy of Raja Raja Chola by the king of Kulasekhara dynasty (Second Cheras), which is now part of modern India, led to the naval Kandalur War in AD 994.

The Quran and the Sunnah have numerous references to protection and immunity of diplomats. The Islamic prophet Muhammad sent and received envoys and strictly forbade harming them. This practice was continued by the Rashidun caliphs who exchanged diplomats with the Ethiopians and the Byzantines. This diplomatic exchange continued during the Arab–Byzantine wars.

Classical Sharia called for hospitality to be shown towards anyone who has been granted amān (or right of safe passage). Amān was readily granted to any emissary bearing a letter or another sealed document. The duration of the amān was typically a year. Envoys with this right of passage were given immunity of person and property. They were exempt from taxation, as long as they did not engage in trade.

As diplomats by definition enter the country under safe conduct, violating them is normally viewed as a great breach of honor. Genghis Khan and the Mongols were well known for insisting on the rights of diplomats, and would often take terrifying vengeance against any state that violated these rights; at times razing entire cities in retaliation for the execution of their ambassadors. The Mongols invaded and destroyed the Khwarezmid Empire after their ambassadors were mistreated.

=== 16th–19th century ===
The British Parliament first guaranteed diplomatic immunity to foreign ambassadors under the Diplomatic Privileges Act in 1709, after Count Andrey Matveyev, a Russian resident in London, was subjected to verbal and physical abuse by British bailiffs.

Modern diplomatic immunity evolved parallel to the development of modern diplomacy. In the 17th century, European diplomats realized that protection from prosecution was essential to doing their jobs, and a set of rules evolved guaranteeing the rights of diplomats. These were still confined to Western Europe and were closely tied to the prerogatives of nobility. Thus, an emissary to the Ottoman Empire could expect to be arrested and imprisoned upon the outbreak of hostilities between his state and the empire. The French Revolution also disrupted this system, as the revolutionary state and Napoleon imprisoned numerous diplomats who were accused of working against France. More recently, the Iran hostage crisis is universally considered a violation of diplomatic immunity. Although the hostage takers did not officially represent the state, host countries are obligated to protect diplomatic property and personnel. On the other hand, during World War II, diplomatic immunity was upheld and the embassies of the belligerents were evacuated through neutral countries.

For the upper class of the 17th, 18th, and 19th centuries, diplomatic immunity was an easy concept to understand. The first embassies were not permanent establishments but actual visits by high-ranking representatives, often close relatives of the sovereign, or by the sovereign in person. As permanent representations evolved, usually on a treaty basis between two powers, they were frequently staffed by relatives of the sovereign or high-ranking nobles.

Warfare was a status of hostilities not between individual states but between their sovereigns, as well as the officers and officials of European governments, and armies often changed employers. Truces and ceasefires were commonplace, as was the fraternization between officers of opposing armies. If officers were taken prisoner, they usually gave their parole and were only restricted to a city away from the theatre of war. Almost always, they were given leave to carry their personal sidearms. Even during the French Revolutionary Wars, British scientists visited the French Academy. In such an atmosphere, it was easy to accept that some persons were immune to the laws. After all, they were still bound by strict requirements of honour and customs.

=== Modern era and Vienna convention ===
In the 19th century, the Congress of Vienna reasserted the rights of diplomats; they have been largely respected since then, as the European model has spread throughout the world. Currently, diplomatic relations, including diplomatic immunity, are governed internationally by the 1961 Vienna Convention on Diplomatic Relations, which has been ratified by almost every country in the world.

In modern times, diplomatic immunity continues to provide a means, albeit imperfect, to safeguard diplomatic personnel from any animosity that might arise between nations. As one article put it: "So why do we agree to a system in which we're dependent on a foreign country's whim before we can prosecute a criminal inside our own borders? The practical answer is: because we depend on other countries to honor our own diplomats' immunity just as scrupulously as we honor theirs."

During the 18 April 1961 Vienna Convention, the Holy See was granted diplomatic immunity to its foreign ambassadors as well.

In the United States, the Diplomatic Relations Act of 1978 (22 U.S.C. § 254a et seq.) follows the principles introduced by the Vienna Conventions. The United States tends to be generous when granting diplomatic immunity to visiting diplomats, because a large number of US diplomats work in host countries less protective of individual rights. If the United States were to punish a visiting diplomat without sufficient grounds, US representatives in other countries could receive harsher treatment. If a person with immunity is alleged to have committed a crime or faces a civil lawsuit, the State Department asks the home country to waive immunity of the alleged offender so that the complaint can be moved to the courts. If immunity is not waived, prosecution cannot be undertaken. However, the State Department still has the right to expel the diplomat. In many such cases, the diplomat's visas are revoked, and they and their family may be barred from returning to the United States. Crimes committed by members of a diplomat's family can also result in dismissal.

== Exceptions to the Vienna Convention ==
Some countries have made reservations to the Vienna Convention on Diplomatic Relations, but they are minor. A number of countries limit the diplomatic immunity of persons who are citizens of the receiving country. As nations keep faith to their treaties with differing zeal, other rules may also apply, though in most cases this summary is a reasonably accurate approximation. The Convention does not cover the personnel of international organizations, whose privileges are decided upon on a case-by-case basis, usually in the treaties founding such organizations.

=== UN organisations ===
The United Nations system (including its agencies, which comprise the most recognizable international bodies such as the World Bank and many others) has a relatively standardized form of limited immunities for staff traveling on UN laissez-passer; diplomatic immunity is often granted to the highest-ranking officials of these agencies. Consular officials (that do not have concurrent diplomatic accreditation) formally have a more limited form of immunity, generally limited to their official duties. Diplomatic technical and administrative staff also have more limited immunity under the Vienna Convention; for this reason, some countries may accredit a member of technical or administrative staff as an attaché.

=== Others ===
Other categories of government officials that may travel frequently to other countries may not have diplomatic passports or diplomatic immunity, such as members of the military, high-ranking government officials, ministers, and others. For the US military, official passports can be used for work related travels only. Many countries provide non-diplomatic official passports to such personnel, and there may be different classes of such travel documents such as official passports, service passports, and others. De facto recognition of some form of immunity may be conveyed by states accepting officials traveling on such documents, or there may exist bilateral agreements to govern such cases (as in, for example, the case of military personnel conducting or observing exercises on the territory of the receiving country).

Formally, diplomatic immunity may be limited to officials accredited to a host country, or traveling to or from their host country. In practice, many countries may effectively recognize diplomatic immunity for those traveling on diplomatic passports, with admittance to the country constituting acceptance of the diplomatic status. However, this is not universal, and diplomats have been prosecuted and jailed for crimes committed outside the country they are accredited to.

As a result of their title, diplomats are exempt from being prosecuted by the state in open court when they are suspected to be guilty of a crime. Not only are these agents free from the criminal jurisdiction of the state, they are also immune from administrative and civil jurisdiction. This applies for most scenarios; however, there are some exceptions when the diplomatic immunity is subject to waiver.

1. Any events that are associated with individual stationary property in the land of the receiving State, with the exception of whether or not he is directed to do so for a plan.
2. Any events with regards to a diplomat serving in another role from another State, including heir, inheritor of a will, executor, administrator.
3. Any activity by a diplomat, in the receiving State, that is related to any professional or commercial operations beyond the scope of his directed responsibilities.

Asadollah Asadi, an Iranian diplomat, was arrested while returning to his residence in Austria on a highway in Germany on June 10, 2018, accused of being involved in an attempted bombing at a gathering of the National Council of Resistance of Iran (a political organisation opposing the Iranian regime). While Assadi was entitled to diplomatic immunity where applicable, it was deemed that he was not protected when he was arrested as he was on holiday (in Germany) outside the country where he was posted and hence protected.

== Uses and abuses ==
In reality, most diplomats are representatives of nations with a tradition of professional civil service; they are expected to obey regulations governing their behaviour and suffer severe disciplinary action if they flout local laws. In many nations, a professional diplomat's career may be compromised if they (or members of their family) disobey the local authorities or cause serious embarrassment. Such cases are, at any rate, a violation of the spirit of the Vienna Conventions.

The Vienna Convention is explicit that "without prejudice to their privileges and immunities, it is the duty of all persons enjoying such privileges and immunities to respect the laws and regulations of the receiving State." Nevertheless, on some occasions, protected diplomats have violated laws (including those that would be violations at home as well) of the host country, and that country has been essentially limited to informing the diplomat's nation that the diplomat is no longer welcome (persona non grata). Diplomatic agents are not, however, exempt from the jurisdiction of their home state, and hence prosecution may be undertaken by the sending state. For minor violations of the law, the sending state may impose administrative procedures specific to the foreign service or diplomatic mission.

Violation of the law by diplomats has included espionage, smuggling, child custody law violations, money laundering, tax evasion, making terrorist threats, slavery, child solicitation, and murder.

=== Offences against the person ===
On-duty police officer Yvonne Fletcher was murdered in London in 1984, by a person shooting from inside the Libyan embassy during a protest. The incident caused a breakdown in diplomatic relations until Libya admitted "general responsibility" in 1999. The incident became a major factor in Prime Minister Margaret Thatcher's decision to allow President of the United States Ronald Reagan to launch the US bombing of Libya in 1986 from American bases in the United Kingdom.

In 1987, the Human Resources Administration of New York City placed 9-year-old Terrence Karamba in a foster home after his elementary school teachers noticed suspicious scars and injuries. He and his 7-year-old sister, who was also placed in city custody, told officials the wounds had been inflicted by their father, Floyd Karamba, an administrative attaché at the Zimbabwean Mission to the UN. No charges were filed, as Karamba had diplomatic immunity.

In February 1999 in Vancouver, British Columbia, Canada, Kazuko Shimokoji, wife of the Japanese Consul-General, showed up at the emergency department of a city hospital with two black eyes and a bruised neck. She told doctors that her husband had beaten her. When local police questioned her husband, Mr. Shimokoji said, "Yes, I punched her out and she deserved it", and described the incident as "a cultural thing and not a big deal". Although an arrest warrant was issued, Mr. Shimokoji could not be arrested due to his diplomatic immunity. However, his statement to the police was widely reported in both the local and Japanese press. The subsequent public uproar prompted the Japanese Ministry of Foreign Affairs to waive Mr. Shimokoji's immunity. Though he pleaded guilty in Canadian court, he was given an absolute discharge. Nonetheless, he was recalled to Japan where he was reassigned to office duty and had his pay cut.

In 2002, a Colombian diplomat in the United Kingdom was prosecuted for manslaughter once diplomatic immunity was waived by the Colombian government.

In November 2006 in New York City, Fred Matwanga, Kenyan diplomat to the UN, was taken into police custody by officers responding to reports that he had assaulted his son; he was released after asserting diplomatic immunity.

In 2011, Turkish president Recep Tayyip Erdoğan and his team started fighting with UN officials at the United Nations Headquarters. The then secretary general, Ban Ki Moon, soon ran over and apologised to Erdoğan.

In April 2012 in the Philippines, Erick Shcks Bairnals, a technical officer of the Panama Maritime Authority's regional office in Manila, was accused of raping a 19-year-old Filipino woman. Being an attached agency to the Panamanian embassy in Manila, the AMP office was classified as a diplomatic entity, its officers possessing the same privileges conferred to the embassy's diplomats. Shcks was later released from detention because Shcks "enjoys protection under the 1961 Vienna Convention." But ultimately it was determinated that he didn't enjoy diplomatic immunity and police filed charges against him.

In March 2013, the Supreme Court of India restricted Italian ambassador Daniele Mancini from leaving India for breaching an undertaking given to the apex court. Despite Italian and European Union protests regarding the restrictions as contrary to the Vienna Convention on Diplomatic Relations, the Supreme Court of India said it would be unacceptable to argue diplomatic immunity after voluntarily submitting to the court's jurisdiction. The Italian envoy had invoked Article 32 of the Constitution of India when filing an affidavit to the Supreme Court taking responsibility for the return of the two Italian marines to India after casting their votes in the March 2012 general elections in Italy. The Indian Supreme Court ruled that the Italian ambassador had waived his diplomatic immunity and could be charged for contempt. The two marines were being tried in India for the murder of two Indian fishermen off the coast of Kerala (see the Enrica Lexie case).

In October 2013, Russian diplomat Dmitri Borodin was arrested in The Hague, The Netherlands, after neighbours called the police. Borodin was alleged to have been drunk and violent towards his children, aged two and four. Police were in the area because Borodin's wife had lost control over her car while also intoxicated, and had rammed four parked cars near the diplomats' house. Russia immediately demanded an apology from the Dutch government for violating Borodin's diplomatic immunity. The row came at a time of tension between Russia and the Netherlands, after the Russian security services captured a Greenpeace vessel sailing under the Dutch flag, MV Arctic Sunrise, that was protesting against oil drilling in the Prirazlomnoye field.

In June 2014, the New Zealand government confirmed that Mohammed Rizalman Bin Ismail from Malaysia, aged in his 30s and employed at Malaysia's High Commission in Wellington, had invoked diplomatic immunity when faced with charges of burglary and assault with intent to rape after allegedly following a 21-year-old woman to her home. He returned to Malaysia in May 2014 with his family while the case was still in hearing. The New Zealand foreign ministry was criticized for allowing the defendant to leave the country, which was blamed on miscommunication between the foreign ministries of the two countries, as Prime Minister John Key expressed his view that "the man should have faced the charges in New Zealand". Malaysia eventually agreed to send the diplomat back to assist in investigations and he was eventually tried and sentenced to nine months' home detention in New Zealand.

In July 2017, in Jordan, two Jordanian carpenters were invited to repair furniture at an Israeli diplomatic security agent's residence near the Israeli embassy. It is believed that the Jordanians and Israeli security agent quarreled over the ongoing tensions regarding the installations of metal detectors at entry points to al-Aqsa mosque in Jerusalem. One carpenter, a teenager of Palestinian origin, reportedly tried to stab the Israeli security agent with his screwdriver, and the Israeli security agent shot and killed the Jordanian carpenter, and also shot the property landlord, a doctor, who happened to be there at the time. Israel refused to allow Jordanian authorities to question the agent, claiming diplomatic immunity under the Vienna convention.

On 15 August 2017, Grace Mugabe, the former First Lady of Zimbabwe, invoked diplomatic immunity after assault charges were laid against her by a South African model.

In 2018, Saudi–American journalist Jamal Khashoggi was killed and dismembered by 15 Saudi officials inside the Saudi embassy in Turkey. For two weeks, Turkish authorities were prevented from entering the embassy. The CIA concluded that the assassination had been ordered by Mohammed Bin Salman.

In August 2022, UN diplomat Charles Dickens Imene Oliha of South Sudan's Ministry of Foreign Affairs claimed diplomatic immunity and was released from jail in New York City after raping a woman twice inside her apartment building. He subsequently returned to South Sudan, where he was suspended from his duties and is to be investigated.

=== Theft ===
In April 2021, two Pakistani embassy employees in South Korea were caught shoplifting in Seoul. They were caught stealing $1.70 worth of chocolate and a $10 hat. The case was closed owing to their diplomatic immunity.

=== Smuggling ===
Diplomats and officials involved in drug smuggling have benefited from diplomatic immunity. For example, a Venezuelan general wanted in the United States on drugs charges was arrested in Aruba only to be released after the Venezuelan government protested his diplomatic immunity and threatened sanctions if Aruba did not release him.

In December 2014, after their immunity was waived by Gambia, Gambian diplomats were found guilty by Southwark Crown Court of London for selling tax-free tobacco from the Gambian embassy in the United Kingdom. The Crown Prosecution Service told the court that much of this was sold from the embassy without paying value-added tax and excise duty.

=== Employer abuse and slavery ===
Diplomatic immunity from local employment and labor law has precipitated incidents in which diplomatic staff have been accused of abusing local workers, who are often hired for positions requiring local knowledge (such as an administrative assistant, press/PR officer) or for general labor. In such situations, the employees are in a legal limbo where the laws of neither the host country nor the diplomat's country are enforceable. Diplomats have ignored local laws concerning minimum wages, maximum working hours, vacation and holidays, and in some cases have imprisoned employees in their homes, deprived them of their earned wages, passports, food, and communication with the outside world, abused them physically and emotionally, and invaded their privacy. Reported incidents include the following:

- In 1999, a Bangladeshi woman, Shamela Begum, claimed she had been enslaved by a senior Bahraini envoy to the United Nations and his wife. Begum charged that the couple took her passport, struck her, and paid her just $800 for ten months of service—during which she was only twice allowed out of the couple's New York apartment. The envoy and his wife claimed diplomatic immunity, and Begum later reached a civil settlement with her employers. By some estimates, "hundreds of women have been exploited by their diplomat employers over the past 20 years" to 2014.
- In 2003 in Finland, a Filipina maid escaped from an embassy of an unidentified Asian country, and reported being held in conditions approaching slavery: she was forced to work from 7 a.m. to 10 p.m., 7 days a week, and the ambassador's children were permitted to hit her. On grounds of diplomatic immunity, no charges could be filed.
- In 2009, South Africa was criticised for claiming immunity from labor laws relating to a Ukrainian domestic worker at the residence of the South African ambassador in Ireland.
- In 2010, the American Civil Liberties Union filed an amicus brief in Swarna v. Al-Awadi to argue that human trafficking is a commercial activity engaged in for personal profit, which falls outside the scope of a diplomat's official functions, and therefore diplomatic immunity does not apply. An appeals court ruled that Al-Awadi did not have diplomatic immunity in that situation.
- In 2013, Indian consular official Devyani Khobragade was detained, hand-cuffed, strip searched, DNA swabbed, and held in a federal holding cell in New York, relating to allegations of non-payment of US minimum wage and for fraudulently lying about the wages to be paid on a visa application for her domestic worker. India registered a strong protest and initiated a review of privileges afforded to American consular officials in India as a result.
- In 2015, two Nepalese women were rescued from the fifth floor of the residence of a Saudi Arabian diplomat in Gurgaon, India. They were allegedly confined there and abused physically and sexually by the diplomat and his family and friends. The women were rescued in a police raid planned after the police received a letter from the Nepal embassy regarding their plight. Several persons, the Saudi diplomat among them, were booked for wrongful confinement and gang rape. Saudi Ambassador Saud Mohammed Alsati commented, "This is completely false. We would not like to comment any further since the case is under investigation by the Indian police." Ten days after the diplomat was accused, it was confirmed that he had left India.

=== Vehicular offences ===
==== Parking violations ====
A particular problem is the difficulty in enforcing ordinary laws, such as prohibitions on double parking. For example, the Autobahn 555 in Cologne, Germany, was nicknamed the "Diplomatenrennbahn" (Diplomat's Racetrack) when Bonn was the capital of West Germany, because of the numerous diplomats that used to speed through the highway under diplomatic immunity. Certain cities, for example The Hague and New York City, have taken to impounding such cars rather than fining their owners. Diplomats' status does not guarantee the release of impounded cars. Diplomats' cars may not be searched or entered in the US.

Diplomatic missions have their own regulations, but many require their staff to pay any fines due for parking violations. A 2006 economic study found that there was a significant correlation between home-country corruption (as measured by Transparency International) and unpaid parking fines: six countries had in excess of 100 violations per diplomat: Kuwait, Egypt, Chad, Sudan, Bulgaria and Mozambique. In particular, New York City, which hosts the United Nations Headquarters, regularly protests to the United States Department of State about nonpayment of parking tickets because of diplomatic status. In 2001, the city had more than 200,000 outstanding parking tickets from diplomats, totaling more than $21.3 million, of which only $160,682 had been collected; a decade later, the total cost of unpaid parking tickets was over $17 million. In 1997, then-mayor Rudy Giuliani proposed to the Clinton administration that the U.S. State Department revoke the special DPL plates for diplomats who ignore parking summonses; the State Department denied Giuliani's request.

In cities that impose a congestion charge, the decision of some diplomatic missions not to furnish payment has proved controversial. In London, embassies have amassed approximately £58 million in unpaid charges as of 2012, with the American embassy comprising approximately £6 million and the Russian, German and Japanese missions around £2 million each.

==== Vehicular assault and drunk driving ====
===== Georgian driver in the United States =====
In January 1997, Gueorgui Makharadze, a high-ranking Georgian diplomat, caused a five-car pileup in Washington, D.C., in the United States, which killed a 16-year-old girl. Makharadze's claim of diplomatic immunity created a national outrage in the United States, particularly given Makharadze's previous record of driving offenses: In April 1996, Makharadze had been charged with speeding in Virginia, and four months later, he was detained by District of Columbia police on suspicion of drunk driving. In both prior cases, charges were dismissed based on his immunity. On the basis of the media coverage, Georgia revoked Makharadze's immunity, and he was ultimately sentenced to seven years in prison after pleading guilty to one count of involuntary manslaughter and four counts of aggravated assault.

===== American driver in Russia =====
On 27 October 1998, in Vladivostok, Russia, Douglas Kent, the American Consul General to Russia, was involved in a car accident that left a young man, Alexander Kashin, disabled. Kent was not prosecuted in a US court. Under the Vienna Convention, diplomatic immunity does not apply to civil actions relating to vehicular accidents, but in 2006, the United States Court of Appeals for the Ninth Circuit ruled that, since he was using his vehicle for consular purposes, Kent could not be sued civilly.

===== Russian driver in Canada =====
In 2001, a Russian diplomat, Andrei Knyazev, hit and killed a woman while driving drunk in Ottawa. Knyazev refused to take a breathalyzer at the scene of the crash, citing diplomatic immunity. Russia refused Canadian requests to waive his immunity, and Knyazev was expelled from Canada. Though the Russian Foreign Ministry fired him and charged him with involuntary manslaughter, and Russian and Canadian authorities cooperated in the investigation, the case caused a political storm in Canada. Many accused the Foreign Ministry of incompetence after it emerged that Knyazev had twice been previously investigated for drunk driving. The Canadian Foreign Minister had fought unsuccessfully to have Knyazev tried in Ottawa. In 2002, Knyazev was found guilty of involuntary manslaughter in Russia.

===== American driver in Romania =====
On 3 December 2004, in Bucharest, Romania, Christopher Van Goethem, an American Marine serving his embassy, ran a red traffic signal, collided with a taxi, and killed popular Romanian musician Teo Peter. The Romanian government requested the American government to lift his immunity, which it refused to do. In a court-martial, he was acquitted of manslaughter and adultery but was convicted of obstruction of justice and making false statements.

===== Canadian driver in Tanzania =====
On 9 December 2009, in Tanzania, Canadian Junior Envoy Jean Touchette was arrested after it was reported that he spat at a traffic police officer on duty in the middle of a traffic jam in the Banana district on the outskirts of Dar es Salaam. Canada's High Commissioner, Robert Orr, was summoned by the Tanzanian Foreign Ministry over the incident, and the junior envoy was later recalled.

===== Romanian driver in Singapore =====
On 15 December 2009, in Singapore, the Romanian chargé d'affaires, Silviu Ionescu, was allegedly behind a drunk-driving hit-and-run accident that killed a 30-year-old man and seriously injured two others. He left Singapore for Romania three days after the accident. The Romanian foreign ministry suspended Ionescu from his post. A coroner's inquiry in Singapore, which included testimony by the Romanian embassy driver, concluded that Ionescu was solely responsible for the accident. An Interpol Red Notice was subsequently issued for his arrest and possible extradition notwithstanding the fact that Romania had not waived his diplomatic immunity and had commenced criminal proceedings against him in Romania. The Singapore government argued that by reason of Article 39(2) of the Vienna Convention, Ionescu was no longer protected by diplomatic immunity. Ionescu was eventually sentenced to six years in jail.

===== American driver in Pakistan =====
In January 2011 in Lahore, Pakistan, American embassy employee Raymond Allen Davis shot and killed two Pakistani civilians, while a third man was struck and killed by a US consulate car responding to the shooting. According to Davis, they were about to rob him and he acted in self-defense. When detained by police, Davis claimed to be a consultant at the US consulate in Lahore. He was formally arrested and remanded into custody. Further investigations revealed that he was working with the CIA as a contractor in Pakistan. The US State Department declared him a diplomat and repeatedly requested immunity under the Vienna Convention on Diplomatic Relations, to which Pakistan is a signatory. On 16 March 2011, Davis was released after the families of the two killed men were paid $2.4 million in diyya (a form of monetary compensation or blood money). Judges then acquitted him on all charges and Davis immediately departed Pakistan.

===== United Nations driver in Pakistan =====
On 10 April 2011, in Islamabad, Pakistan, Patrick Kibuta, an electrical engineer in the United Nations Military Observer Group in India and Pakistan, caused a vehicle collision with another vehicle while under the influence of alcohol. Kibuta, who was driving in the opposing lane, injured a Canadian citizen residing in Islamabad, who suffered multiple fractures and required surgery. The Kohsar police impounded Kibuta's UN vehicle on the scene, and a blood test confirmed that he had an elevated blood alcohol level. Charges for reckless and drunken driving were filed against Kibuta, who enjoyed diplomatic immunity.

===== American driver in Pakistan =====
On 14 February 2013, a vehicle bearing diplomatic plates registered to the US Embassy got into an accident in Islamabad, Pakistan, involving two residents of whom one was killed and the other survived. Murder charges were laid under Section 320 of the Pakistani Penal Code against the driver of the vehicle who is a diplomat according to Pakistani officials.

===== American driver in Kenya =====
In July 2013, Joshua Walde, an American diplomat in Nairobi, Kenya, crashed into a mini-bus, killing one man and seriously injuring eight others, who were left with no financial assistance to pay for hospital bills. United States embassy officials took the diplomat and his family out of Kenya the following day. The United States government was concerned about the impact the accident could have on bilateral relations with Kenya. Walde gave a statement to police, but was not detained due to his diplomatic immunity. Kenyan police say the case remains under investigation.

===== Lebanese driver in South Korea =====
In September 2013, Jad Saeed al-Hassan, Lebanese Ambassador to South Korea, was involved in a hit-and-run in Seoul. Right after the accident, he drove directly into the Lebanese embassy compound and refused to cooperate with the local police investigation, claiming his diplomatic immunity. He stayed in his post as ambassador until his death due to another traffic collision in Seoul in 2014.

===== Qatari driver in the United States =====
On 12 September 2015, Sheikh Khalid bin Hamad Al Thani tried to claim diplomatic immunity when his Ferrari LaFerrari and a Porsche 911 GT3 were caught on camera drag racing through a residential neighborhood in Beverly Hills. He owns the cars and a drag racing team, and is a member of Qatar's ruling family. The Beverly Hills Police Department contacted the US State Department to clarify if he had diplomatic immunity. They stated he did not. However, his face was not shown on camera, and no officer witnessed the crime, so the state of California has not yet pressed charges. He has since fled the country. The investigation is ongoing.

===== Saudi driver in Germany =====
In June 2017, in Berlin, Germany, a Saudi driver killed a cyclist by opening the door of his Porsche directly into the cyclist's path without checking to see if the road was clear. Anger arose when the Saudi claimed diplomatic immunity. Police said that under normal circumstances the driver would face investigation and possible prosecution on suspicion of negligent manslaughter, but prosecutors said they had no choice but to close the case because he had diplomatic immunity.

===== American driver in the United Kingdom =====
On 27 August 2019, Anne Sacoolas, the wife of an American government employee working in the United Kingdom, was a suspect in a traffic incident involving 19-year-old Harry Dunn in Croughton, Northamptonshire. Dunn was riding his motorcycle when it was reported that a woman emerged from RAF Croughton driving on the wrong side of the road, resulting in a head-on collision. After 999 handlers wrongly categorized the call, there was a 43-minute wait for an ambulance, resulting in a two-hour delay arriving at a trauma center, where Harry Dunn later died. Sacoolas was breathalyzed at the accident site. The following day, police interviewed Sacoolas at her home, learning the US claimed diplomatic immunity.

Sacoolas told police she had no immediate plans to leave the country. However, on 13 October US authorities notified the UK's Foreign and Commonwealth Office of plans to send Sacoolas home, unless serious objections were raised: on 16 October, the UK's Foreign Secretary, Dominic Raab, went to present objections, a day after the family was sent back.

Woody Johnson, U.S. Ambassador to the UK, expressed "profound sadness" at the death of Harry Dunn and the US Embassy also offered their sympathies and condolences. U.S. President Donald Trump called it a "terrible accident" and mentioned that the woman was "driving on the wrong side of the road, and that can happen". The US government has not waived the diplomatic immunity afforded to Sacoolas and has stated she would not return to the UK, despite calls by the UK government to do so.

Sacoolas was scheduled to appear in UK court via video link charged with causing the death of Mr Dunn by dangerous driving. A hearing took place in Westminster Magistrates' Court on 18 January 2022. She appeared by video link at the Old Bailey, where she pleaded guilty to causing death by careless driving on 20 October 2022. She was handed an eight-month prison term, suspended for 12 months, and was also disqualified from driving for 12 months.

===== American driver in Zimbabwe =====
In 2023, U.S. diplomat Eric Kimpton, while driving, struck and killed 11-year-old Lillian Mapiye in Zimbabwe. Invoking diplomatic immunity under the Vienna Convention, Kimpton avoided legal proceedings and returned to the United States. The incident sparked discussions between the Zimbabwean government and the U.S. Embassy, with officials emphasizing that while immunity protects diplomats, it does not absolve them of their moral responsibility to respect the laws and lives of their host country.

=== Financial abuse ===
Historically, large debts run up by diplomats have caused many problems. Some financial institutions do not extend credit to diplomats because they have no legal means of ensuring the money be repaid. Local citizens and businesses are often at a disadvantage when filing civil claims against a diplomat, especially in cases of unpaid rent, alimony, and child support.

==== Rents ====
The bulk of diplomatic debt lies in the rental of office space and living quarters. Individual debts can range from a few thousand dollars to $1 million in back rent. A group of diplomats and the office space in which they work are referred to as a diplomatic mission. Creditors cannot sue missions individually to collect money they owe. Landlords and creditors have found that the only thing they can do is contact a city agency to see if they can try to get some money back. They cannot enter the offices or apartments of diplomats to evict them because the Foreign Sovereign Immunities Act says that "the property in the United States of a foreign state shall be immune from attachment, arrest and execution" (28 U.S.C. § 1609). This has led creditors who are owed money by diplomats to become more cautious about their renters and to change their rental or payment policies.

In one case, for example, officials from Zaire stopped paying rent to their private landlord and ran up $400,000 in debt. When the landlord sued, the US State Department defended the Zaireans on the basis of diplomatic immunity, and a circuit court agreed. When the landlord finally cut off the utilities, the officials fled without paying their back rent. The landlords reportedly later reached an "amicable agreement" with the Zairean government.

==== Alimony and child support ====
The issue of abusing diplomatic immunity in family relations, especially alimony and child support, has become so widespread that it prompted discussion at the 1995 UN Fourth World Conference on Women, in Beijing. Historically, the United Nations has not become involved with family disputes and has refused to garnish the wages of diplomats who owe money for child support, citing sovereign immunity. However, in September 1995, the incumbent head of Legal Affairs for the United Nations acknowledged there was a moral and legal obligation to take at least a partial responsibility in family disputes. Fathers working as diplomats who refused to fulfill their family-related financial duties were increasing in numbers in the United Nations: several men who had left their wives and children were still claiming UN dependency, travel, and education allowances for their families, though they are no longer supporting those families.

==== Taxes and fees ====
Diplomats are exempt from most taxes, but not from "charges levied for specific services rendered". In certain cases, whether a payment is or is not considered a tax may be disputed, such as central London's congestion charge. It was reported in 2006 that the UAE embassy had agreed to pay their own accumulated charges of nearly £100,000.

There is an obligation for the receiving state not to "discriminate as between states"; in other words, any such fees should be payable by all accredited diplomats equally. This may allow the diplomatic corps to negotiate as a group with the authorities of the receiving country.

Diplomats are exempt from import duty and tariffs for items for their personal use. In some countries, this has led to charges that diplomatic agents are profiting personally from resale of "tax free" goods. The receiving state may choose to impose restrictions on what may reasonably constitute personal use (for example, only a certain quantity of cigarettes per day). When enacted, such restrictions are generally quite generous so as to avoid tit-for-tat responses.

==== Money laundering ====
United States v. Al Sharaf is a criminal case which was filed by the government on March 5, 2015, in the United States District Court for the District of Columbia. Al Sharaf was a Kuwaiti financial attaché assigned to handle the finances of Kuwait Health Office in Washington, D.C. She was charged by the government with violating 18 U.S.C § 1956, conspiring to launder money. Al Sharaf filed a motion to dismiss the case on the basis of lack of subject matter jurisdiction because as per the 22 U.S.C § 254d her actions were immune under the diplomatic immunity that she had. Since it was a criminal case, the prosecution presented evidence beyond a reasonable doubt to prove that Al Sharaf had engaged in commercial activity and her actions were different from her official functions as a representative of Kuwait, thereby, as per the VCDR art. 31(c) her diplomatic immunity was subject to waiver. The court ruled in prosecution's favor and stated that since the defendant had engaged in commercial activity which was different from her official functions, her diplomatic immunity was subject to waiver and hence the defendant's motion to dismiss the case on the basis of lack of subject matter jurisdiction was denied.

=== Espionage and sabotage ===
Franz von Papen entered the diplomatic service in December 1913 as a military attaché to the German ambassador in the United States. Starting in September 1914, Papen abused his diplomatic immunity as German military attaché, violating US laws to start organising plans for incursions into Canada for a campaign of sabotage against canals, bridges and railroads. In October 1914, Papen became involved with what was later dubbed "the Hindu–German Conspiracy", by covertly arranging with Indian nationalists based in California for arms trafficking to the latter for a planned uprising against the British Raj. In February 1915, Papen also covertly organised the Vanceboro international bridge bombing, in which his diplomatic immunity protected him from arrest. At the same time, he remained involved in plans to restore Huerta to power, and arranged for the arming and financing of a planned invasion of Mexico. Papen's covert operations were known to British intelligence, which shared its information with the US government. As a result, for complicity in the planning of acts of sabotage on 28 December 1915, Captain von Papen was declared persona non grata and recalled to Germany. Upon his return, he was awarded the Iron Cross.

On 24 April 2008, in New Orleans, Mexican press attaché Rafael Quintero Curiel was seen stealing BlackBerry PDA units from a White House press meeting room. Quintero made it all the way to the airport before members of the United States Secret Service caught up with him. He initially denied taking the devices, but after being confronted with security video, Quintero claimed it was purely accidental, gave the devices back, claimed diplomatic immunity and left New Orleans with the Mexican delegation. He was eventually fired for the incident.

In 2021, it was reported that the UAE Embassy in Canberra was building non-compliant fences and installing CCTV.

== In the United States ==
The following chart outlines the immunities afforded to foreign diplomatic personnel residing in the United States. In general, these rules follow the Vienna Convention (or the New York Convention for UN officials) and apply in other countries as well (with the exceptions of immunities for United Nations officials, which can vary widely across countries based on the "Host Country Agreement" signed between the UN and the host country, whereby additional immunities beyond those granted by the New York Convention may be established).

Category		May be arrested or detained	Residence may be entered subject to ordinary procedures	May be issued traffic ticket	May be subpoenaed as witness	May be prosecuted	Official family member
Diplomatic	Diplomatic agent	No (Note: Reasonable constraints, however, may be applied in emergency circumstances involving self-defense, public safety, or the prevention of serious criminal acts.)	No	Yes (although not obliged to pay)	No	No	Same as sponsor
Diplomatic	Member of administrative and technical staff	No	No	Yes	No	No	Same as sponsor
Diplomatic	Service staff	Yes (Note: This table presents general rules. Particularly in the cases indicated, the employees of certain foreign countries may enjoy higher levels of privileges and immunities on the basis of special bilateral agreements.)	Yes	Yes	Yes	Yes	No
Consular	Career consular officers	Yes, if for a felony and pursuant to a warrant.	Yes (Note: Note that consular residences are sometimes located within the official consular premises. In such cases, only the official office space is protected from police entry.)	Yes	No, for official acts. Testimony may not be compelled in any case.	No, for official acts. Otherwise, yes (Note: A small number of senior officers are entitled to be treated identically to "diplomatic agents".)	No
Consular	Honorary consular officers	Yes	Yes	Yes	No, for official acts. Yes, in all other cases	No, for official acts. Otherwise, yes	No
Consular	Consular employees	Yes	Yes	Yes	No, for official acts. Yes, in all other cases	No, for official acts. Otherwise, yes	No
International organization	Diplomatic-level staff of missions to international organizations	No (Note: If the international organisation is located in the country of the staff member's nationality, exemption only extends to official acts.)	No	Yes	No	No	Same as sponsor
International organization	International organization staff	Yes	Yes	Yes	No, for official acts. Yes, in all other cases	No, for official acts. Otherwise, yes	No
International organization	Support staff of missions to international organizations	Yes	Yes	Yes	No, for official acts. Yes, in all other cases	No, for official acts. Otherwise, yes	No

== See also ==
- International Organizations Immunities Act
- Right of asylum
- Consular immunity
- State immunity
