= Ioan Condruc =

Romanian former football player

Personal information
- Date of birth: 19 April 1951 (age 75)
- Place of birth: Vișeu de Sus, Romania
- Position: Defender

Senior career*
Years	Team	Apps	(Gls)
- FC Baia Mare
- UTA Arad
- U Cluj

International career
- Romania
- * Club domestic league appearances and goals

Ioan Condruc (born 19 April 1951) was a Romanian former football player, who played for FC Baia Mare, UTA Arad and U Cluj. Condruc was the team captain during the FC Baia Mare golden period between 1977 and 1981. Ioan Condruc played for UTA Arad when UTA won the championship title. He was part of the team which played and eliminated Feyenoord Rotterdam from European Cup .
