= Ioan Baba =

Romanian poet

- Born: November 25, 1951 (age 74); Seleuš, South Banat District, Yugoslavia
- Occupations: linguist; journalist; translation; poet

Ioan Baba (Romanian pronunciation: [iˈo̯am ˈbaba]; November 25, 1951) is an ethnic Romanian Serbian poet, journalist, publicist, and translator.

In 2003, he became vice president of the Societății Române de Etnografie și Folclor in Voivodina.

He has published 44 books of poetry and non-fiction, and 18 translations. He was an editor at Novi Sad Radio Station. He has worked at Radio Television of Vojvodina.

== Bibliography ==
- Popas în timp (1984)
- Preludiu imaginar (1988)
- În cuibul ochiului (1989)
- Oglinda triunghiulară (1990)
- Poeme incisive (1991)
- Năzbâtii candide (1994)
- Mărturisiri, confluențe (1997)
- Inscripție pe aer (1997)
- Compendiu biobliografic, Scriitori (1997)
- Cămașa de rigoare (1998)
- ReversAvers (1999)
- Lexiconul Artiștilor Plastici Români contemporani din Iugoslavia - vol I (1999)
- Cele mai frumoase poezii (2002)
- Poemele D (2002)
- Pe șevaletul orizontului (1986)
- Indiciul unității (1988)
- Antologia literaturii și artei din comunitățile românești vol I (1998)
- Laptele verde al câmpiei, 5 poeți din Voivodina (2001)
- Florilegiu basarabean (2002)
- Florilegiu bănățean (2002)
- Vremea creativității lui Slobodan Crnogorac (2003)

=== Translations ===
- Paradoksistički Dvostihovi (2000), a translation of Distihuri paradoxiste by Florentin Smarandache
- Cerul din pahar (2002)
