= Gueorgui Makharadze =

Georgian diplomat

Giorgi Makharadze (Georgian: გიორგი მახარაძე; born 1961) was the deputy ambassador of the Republic of Georgia to the United States. Around midnight on January 3, 1997, Makharadze was speeding while driving in Washington, D.C. and hit a line of stopped cars at a traffic light, causing a five car crash that injured four people and killed a Brazilian girl, Jovianne Waltrick, who was sixteen years old. He had been drinking alcohol and was found to have a blood alcohol content of at least 0.15, higher than the city's then legal limit of .10.

Makharadze started his career as a low-ranking member of the Soviet Foreign Ministry, initially starting as a Clerk in the Soviet Embassy in Bulgaria in 1982. He was later posted in a Soviet Consulate in Calcutta, India. In 1986, he applied to higher education and also received approval to study English and Persian. In 1987, he was posted as Assistant Chargé d'Affaires at the Soviet Consulate in Iraq. In 1990 he was involved in an international incident when he defected from the USSR to the West by crossing the border of Iraq and Kuwait during the Iraqi invasion of Kuwait. In late 1990, the then Soviet Government demanded his extradition from the US, however, Georgian leaders of the Soviet Union mounted pressure not to prosecute him. In 1991, he returned to Georgia and started as a Joint Secretary of the Georgian Foreign Ministry. In 1993, he was posted as the Deputy Ambassador to Turkey with concurrent accreditation to Iran, and in 1995 he became the Deputy Ambassador to the US.

Despite being intoxicated during the 1997 fatal crash, he was released from custody because he was a diplomat. The U.S. government asked the Georgian government to waive his immunity, which they did and Makharadze was tried and convicted of manslaughter by the U.S. and sentenced to seven to twenty-one years in prison. The first three years of his sentence were served in a North Carolina prison. He was repatriated to his home nation of Georgia in 2000 to continue serving his sentence; and was released on February 27, 2002.
