= Ioan Halmoș =

Romanian footballer

Personal information
- Date of birth: 23 April 1901
- Date of death: Unknown
- Position: Midfielder

Senior career*
Years	Team	Apps	(Gls)
1921–1922	AVTK Timișoara		
1922–1924	Unirea Timișoara		
1925–1926	Sparta CFR Timișoara		
1926–1929	Banatul Timișoara		

International career
1923	Romania	1	(0)
- * Club domestic league appearances and goals

Ioan Halmoș (born 23 April 1901, date of death unknown) was a Romanian footballer who played as a midfielder.

== International career ==
Ioan Halmoș played one friendly match for Romania, on 10 June 1923 under coach Teofil Morariu in a 2–1 loss against Yugoslavia at the 1923 King Alexander's Cup.
