= Consular immunity =

Privilege designated by the Vienna Convention on Consular Relations

Consular immunity privileges are described in the Vienna Convention on Consular Relations of 1963 (VCCR). Consular immunity offers protections similar to diplomatic immunity, but these protections are not as extensive, given the functional differences between consular and diplomatic officers. For example, consular officers are not accorded absolute immunity from a host country’s criminal jurisdiction, they may be tried for certain local crimes upon action by a local court, and are immune from local jurisdiction only in cases directly relating to consular functions.

== Consular and diplomatic immunity in the US ==
Category		May be arrested or detained	Residence may be entered subject to ordinary procedures	May be issued traffic ticket	May be subpoenaed as witness	May be prosecuted for unofficial acts	Official family member
Diplomatic	Diplomatic agent	No (Note: Reasonable constraints, however, may be applied in emergency circumstances involving self-defense, public safety, or the prevention of serious criminal acts.)	No	Yes	No	No	Same as sponsor
Diplomatic	Member of administrative and technical staff	No	No	Yes	No	No	Same as sponsor
Diplomatic	Service staff	Yes (Note: This table presents general rules. Particularly in the cases indicated, the employees of certain foreign countries may enjoy higher levels of privileges and immunities on the basis of special bilateral agreements.)	Yes	Yes	Yes	Yes	No
Consular	Career consular officers	Yes, if for a felony and pursuant to a warrant.	Yes (Note: Note that consular residences are sometimes located within the official consular premises. In such cases, only the official office space is protected from police entry.)	Yes	No, for official acts. Testimony may not be compelled in any case.	Yes (Note: A small number of senior officers are entitled to be treated identically to "diplomatic agents".)	No
Consular	Honorary consular officers	Yes	Yes	Yes	No, for official acts. Yes, in all other cases	Yes	No
Consular	Consular employees	Yes	Yes	Yes	No, for official acts. Yes, in all other cases	Yes	No
International organization	Diplomatic-level staff of missions to international organizations	No	No	Yes	No	No	Same as sponsor
International organization	International organization staff	Yes	Yes	Yes	No, for official acts. Yes, in all other cases	Yes	No
International organization	Support staff of missions to international organizations	Yes	Yes	Yes	No, for official acts. Yes, in all other cases	Yes	No

=== Procedure ===
Procedurally, official acts immunity is raised as an affirmative defense.
