= Yoan =

Yoan is a given name. Notable people with the name include:

- Yoan Capote (born 1977), Cuban sculptor
- Yoan Garneau (born 1995), Quebec singer, winner of season 2 of La Voix
- Yoan Gouffran (born 1986), French footballer of Guadeloupean descent
- Yoan Pablo Hernández (born 1984), Cuban-German boxer
- Yoan Leviev (1934–1994), Bulgarian artist, painter, and creator of monumental artworks
- Yoan López (born 1993), Cuban baseball pitcher
- Yoan Merlo (born 1985), French professional player of the game Warcraft III
- Yoán Moncada (born 1995), Cuban baseball player in Major League Baseball
- Yoan Tisseyre (born 1989), French rugby league player
