= Ionel =

Ionel is a Romanian masculine given name.

== People named Ionel ==
- Ionel Augustin (born 1955), retired Romanian footballer
- Ionel Averian (born 1976), Romanian sprint canoeist
- Ionel Budișteanu (1919–1991), Romanian violinist and conductor
- Ionel Constantin (born 1963), Romanian sprint canoeist
- Ionel Dănciulescu (born 1976), Romanian football player
- Ionel Fernic (1901–1938), Romanian composer, aviator and writer
- Ionel Gane (born 1971), retired Romanian football player
- Ionel Ganea (born 1973), Romanian football striker
- Ionel Haiduc (1937–2026), Romanian chemist
- Ionel Igorov, Romanian sprint canoeist
- Ionel Letcae (born 1961), Romanian sprint canoeist
- Ionel Pârvu (born 1970), Romanian former football player
- Ionel Perlea (1900–1970), Romanian conductor
- Ionel Sânteiu (born 1948), Romanian former tennis player
- Ionel Schein (1927–2004), French architect
- Ionel Sinescu (born 1951), Romanian physician
- Ionel Teodoreanu (1897–1954), Romanian novelist and lawyer

== See also ==
- Ionel (surname)
- Ionel, the name of Iohanisfeld village, Otelec Commune, Timiș County, under the communist regime and until 2008
- Ion
- Ionuț
- Ioan
- Valea lui Ionel River, headwater of the Sebeş River in Romania
