= Gia Ionesco =

Romanian-born keyboardist, composer and bandleader

Gia Ionesco is a Romanian-born keyboardist, composer, and bandleader, known for his contributions to the genres of jazz, avant-garde, jazz fusion, progressive rock, and third stream music.

== Early life and education ==
Gia Ionesco was born in Bucharest, Romania. He comes from a family of distinguished scientists: his father, a Ph.D. member of the Romanian Academy of Sciences, and his mother, a nuclear physicist.

His high school band, Pegasus, participated in major Romanian jazz and rock festivals. Later, his involvement with the group Om led to collaborations with well-known Romanian musicians and participation in diverse musical projects, including movie music and a rock opera.

He attended the Graphic Arts & Music School No. 3, Berzei, in Bucharest, from 1972 to 1976, where he studied both music and graphic arts. From 1978 to 1986, he studied a master's degree in the Faculty of Hydraulic pumps and Turbines at the Politehnica University of Bucharest.

In 1985, he achieved Professional Accreditation as a Piano Solo Virtuoso, Category 1, from the Romanian Ministry of Education. From 1984 to 1988, he studied jazz piano, improvisation, and harmony under Professor Marius Popp, and classical piano and harmony with Professor Dan Mizrahi at the Popular Conservatory of Music in Bucharest.

In 1968–1990, he also studied advanced classical piano, musical composition with Professor Anca Stephanesco, later at Brussel Conservatory of Music. From 1970 to 1996, Ionesco worked with composition, forms, harmony, counterpoint, orchestration, and arrangement under the guidance of Professor Richard Bartzer at The Bartzer Consort in Bucharest. Additionally, between 1985 and 1989, he studied in Electro-Acoustics and Musical Recordings at TVR under the leadership of Fromi Moreno, a composer, producer, and sound engineer.

From 1990 to 1993, he was a student at the Rubin Academy of Music in Jerusalem, Israel, where he studied under the legendary Viaceslav Ganelin focusing on advanced piano, and with Nachum Perifercovich and Peter Wertheimer on forms, composition, arrangement, and contemporary improvisation. In 2003, he participated in a Postgraduate Seminar in Musical Composition led by Chick Armando Corea in Massachusetts, US.

== Career ==
=== 1972–1990: Activity in Romania ===
Studying in Politehnica University of Bucharest, Gia Ionesco remained active musically, composing and performing for weekly live TV The Seven P.M. Show. He also organized concerts and festivals and performed on radio and television broadcasts. In 1984–1985 he collaborated to the soundtrack of the films The Cell and Another Universe, TV series produced and directed by Constantin Chelba for RTV Studios. In 1986, he records The Snow Man, a show produced by Lidia Oprea for RTV.

In 1989, Ionesco worked as production coordinator and columnist for the music section of the Romanian Observer. He obtained the only existing newspaper interview with the famous conductor Sergiu Celibidache.

At the start of the 1990s, He performed with noted saxophonist Peter Wertheimer and then formed the popular fusion group Changes, featuring famed drummer Asaf Sirkis and bassist Gabriel Meir. They performed at major jazz festivals in Israel and released three successful albums for the Jazzis label, Changes One, Changes Two and Super Changes, produced by Adam Baruch. Ionesco composed, arranged, performed, co-produced and engineered most of the material on those discs.

=== 1990–2010: Immigration to Canada ===
In 1992, Gia immigrated to Canada. After teaching at some of Toronto's premier music schools, New Conservatory of Music, Cosmo Music School, Ionesco started Gia's Music School Inc., in Richmond Hill in 1999. The school still operates, enjoying a sterling reputation. In 2006, he wrote a book for children, Gia's Kids: A New Approach to Piano Playing and an easy-to-use notebook for music students.

At the period, Gia Ionesco produced a range of albums, including "After Was Before" (1999), "Excerpts From Three Worlds" (2001), "Quizzarre Pictorials" (2005), "Debate" (2008), and "Piano Of Love" (2010), released on his label Terrace Update. His work, particularly noted in "After Was Before," blends various influences like rock, jazz, classical, and traditional Romanian music, highlighting his eclectic style.

=== 2010–2016 ===
In 2010, Gia Ionesco established the ensemble Gia and the Unpredictable Update. That year, they released two albums: "Metamorph Math" and "The Purpose and Some Recalls."

In 2010, Ionesco contributed to the soundtrack of "The Kennedys" TV series, making his first global TV appearance in May 2011.

At the same year, Gia and the Unpredictable Update recorded a live performance at The Richmond Hill Centre for the Performing Arts, later released as the album "Anatomical Signatures" in 2012. A smaller, trio version of the group, featuring Ionesco, Wilson Laurencin, and Pat Kilbride, also performed and released the album "The Son of Anatomical Signatures" in 2012, recorded live at Toronto's Gate 403.

Gia and the Unpredictable Update performed at venues in Toronto, including Hugh's Room, The Old Mill, Palais Royale, The Rex, and The Painted Lady. The ensemble also performed at the Toronto Jazz Festival in 2011 and released the compilation album "Variable Victors" in 2012. They celebrated the Chinese New Year at the Living Arts Centre of Mississauga in February 2012. In July 2012, Ionesco also worked with his inspiration and mentor, Chick Corea, at Tanglewood, Massachusetts.

In May 2013, Gia Ionesco and his ensemble, Gia and the Unpredictable Update, performed at the Shanghai Spring International Music Festival. The group also conducted a tour, playing in four Chinese cities.

In 2013, they released "Stratagem," a compilation album from their earlier works. The ensemble returned to China in September 2014 to perform at the Hong Kong Jazz Festival and other venues in cities like Beijing and Guangzhou. Additionally, Ionesco's biography were featured in an interview and documentary on Romania TV International's show "Lumea si noi" (The World and Us).

Also, Ionesco worked on a project with Gia & The Superstars, recording at Kaleidoscope Sound studio in Union City, New Jersey. This ensemble prepared for the release of "Stunt Rules".

In September 2015, Ionesco, alongside renowned drummer Virgil Donati and bass player Pat Kilbride, performed at Adelaide Hall in Toronto. This performance was recorded and released as the album "Incentrance" in November 2016.

In 2016, Gia Ionesco signed with AMG/UNIVERSAL MUSIC GROUP INTERNATIONAL, becoming the first musician born in Romania to achieve this milestone.

In December 2016, Ionesco's ensemble, Gia & The Unpredictable Update, released a new live recording album, "The Voyage of Uncle Clue," featuring a diverse lineup of musicians. Additionally, by the end of December 2016, they released another live album, "Far Forward," recorded at Hugh's Room in Toronto.

=== 2016–present ===
In 2016, Gia Ionesco collaborated with John Beetle Bailey, a producer and sound engineer, and Mark S. Berry, a movie and TV producer and promoter.

In 2023, Ionesco had appearances on Canadian TV and radio stations, including a feature on the show "Jazz Gone Wild" with Jaymz Bee on Jazz FM 91.1. At the same year, Gia Ionesco signed with AMG/Sony INTERNATIONAL in the US and secured European representation through KOBALT RECORDS in Germany.

Gia Ionesco appearance on radio shows across various countries including France, Italy, Germany, the UK, the US, Romania, Thailand, and India.

== Notable performances ==
- 1986–1988: Black Sea International Jazz Festival, Costinesti.
- 1986–1990: Sibiu International Jazz Festival (Winner Grand Prix prize in 1990).
- 1989: The Radio Concert Hall, Bucharest, featuring Decebal Badila.
- 1991: Red Sea Jazz Festival, Eilat, Israel.
- 1992: Beit Lesing, Israel.
- 1993: Byblos Club, with Arale Kaminsky, Bob Moses and Asaf Sirkis.
- 1993: Haifa Jazz Festival, The Saddle, featuring Peter Wertheimer and Asaf Sirkis.
- 2000: Gia works with Orchard Records, Canada/USA.
- 2001: Hugh's Room, Toronto, with Bruce Cassidy – Blood, Sweat & Tears, Pat LaBarbera – Elvin Jones Jazz Machine and Wilson Laurencin.
- 2003: Iridium, New York City, on a bill including John Scofield and Wayne Shorter, (and unexpected guest Pat Metheny).
- 2005: Toronto Convention Centre, performs with Courtney Byron Ensemble, featuring Rosemary Galloway.
- 2007: TMA of AFM Hall with Byron Ensemble.
- 2008: Gia and Royce Fay record and remix 'Demiurge By Default (Mind Over Matter)' for the album Xcrewsciating by the band Slick Idiot.
- 2009: Basm Balsam, a 65 de minutes suite, is used by the Modern Ballet Ensemble, Toronto, ulterior incorporated in National Ballet Of Canada.
- 2011: Gia and The Unpredictable Update headline at Hugh's Room, Toronto.
- 2011: Gia and the Unpredictable Update perform and record a concert at The Richmond Hill Centre for the Performing Arts, released as the album Anatomical Signatures in 2012.
- 2011–2014: Appearances on The Liquid Lunch TV Show.
- 2012: Gia and The Unpredictable Update numerous performances at The Rex Jazz Club, on the list of "Best 100 Jazz Clubs of All Times".
- 2012: Collaborations with Chick Corea, John Patitucci, Antonio Sanchez and Bernie Kirsch.
- 2012: Toronto Jazz Festival at Gate 403. Appearances on 'That Channel' TV Show.
- 2013: Celebrations for the Chinese New Year at the Living Arts Centre of Mississauga featured Gia & The Unpredictable Update.
- 2013: Performance for the "History of Jazz" series at the Waterfront Community Center.
- 2013: Gia and The Unpredictable Update tour China. Performs at Shanghai Spring International Music Festival, and play seven shows in four Chinese cities.
- 2013: 'Anatomical Signatures' and 'The Son of Anatomical Signatures' are inducted in the Musical Heritage of Canada.
- 2013: Show at Shapeshifter Lab in Brooklyn, produced by Leonardo Pavkovic, Sunnie Sun and Matthew Garrison, featuring Mino Cinelu, Mauro Pagani, Johnny Johnson, Clint Bahr, Beledo and Kim Plainfield.
- 2014: Interview and documentary about Gia Ionesco for TVR International for the show The World and Us.
- 2015–2017: History of Jazz, Clifford Ojala Org, C Center.

== Discography ==
Year	Album	Label	Notes and remarks
1992	Changes	Jazzis Records	Producer: Adam Baruch; with Asaf Sirkis
1992	Changes 2	Jazzis/Terrace Update Records	Producer: Gia Ionesco, Adam Baruch
1993	Super Changes	Terrace Update/Jazzis Records	Producer: Gia Ionesco, Asaf Sirkis
2000	After Was Before	Terrace Update/Orchard Records	Producer: Gia Ionesco, Betty Yong; dbCD
2001	Excerpts From Three Worlds	Terrace Update/Orchard Records	Producer: Gia Ionesco
2005	Quizarre Pictorials	Terrace Update Records	Producer: Gia Ionesco, Royce Fay
2008	Debate	Terrace Update Records	Producer: Gia Ionesco, Royce Fay
2010	Piano Of Love	Terrace Update Records	Producer: Royce Fay
2010	The Purpose & Some Recalls	Terrace Update Records	Producer: Gia Ionesco, Sunnie Sun
2011	Metamorph Math	Terrace Update/Sunnie Sun Productions	Producer: Gia Ionesco
2012	Anatomical Signatures (Gia & The Unpredictable Update)	Terrace Update/Sunnie Sun Productions	Producer: Gia Ionesco; dbCD
2012	The Son of Anatomical Signatures (Gia & The Unpredictable Update)	Terrace Update/Sunnie Sun Productions	Producer: Sunnie Sun
2013	Variable Victors (Gia & The Unpredictable Update)	Terrace Update/Sunnie Sun Productions	Producer: Mark S. Berry
2013	Stratagem (Gia & The Unpredictable Update)	Terrace Update/Sunnie Sun Productions	Producer: Mark S. Berry
2016	Incentrance (with VIRGIL DONATI)	AMG/Universal Productions	Producer: Sunnie Sun
2016	Far Forward (Gia & The Unpredictable Update)	AMG/Universal Productions	Producer: Sunnie Sun
2016	The Voyage Of Uncle Clue (Gia & The Unpredictable Update)	AMG/Universal Productions	Producer: Sunnie Sun; dbCD
2019	The Case (Gia & The Unpredictable Update)	AMG/Universal Productions	Producer: Sunnie Sun; dbCD
2020	Timeless Limitless (Gia & The Unpredictable Update)	AMG/Universal Productions	Producer: Sunnie Sun; dbCD
2023	Advance (Gia & The Unpredictable Update)	AMG/Sony Productions	Producer: Sunnie Sun; dbCD
