= Ionuț Florea =

Romanian futsal player

Ionuţ Florea Adrian
Personal information
- Full name: Ionuţ Florea
- Date of birth: 17 July 1986 (age 40)
- Place of birth: Romania
- Position: Goalkeeper

Team information
- Current team: Dava Deva

International career
Years	Team	Apps	(Gls)
- Romania

Ionuţ Florea (born 17 July 1986) is a Romanian futsal player who plays for Dava Deva and the Romanian national futsal team.
