= Ioana Rudăreasa =

Romanian-Roma abolitionist (1843–1856)

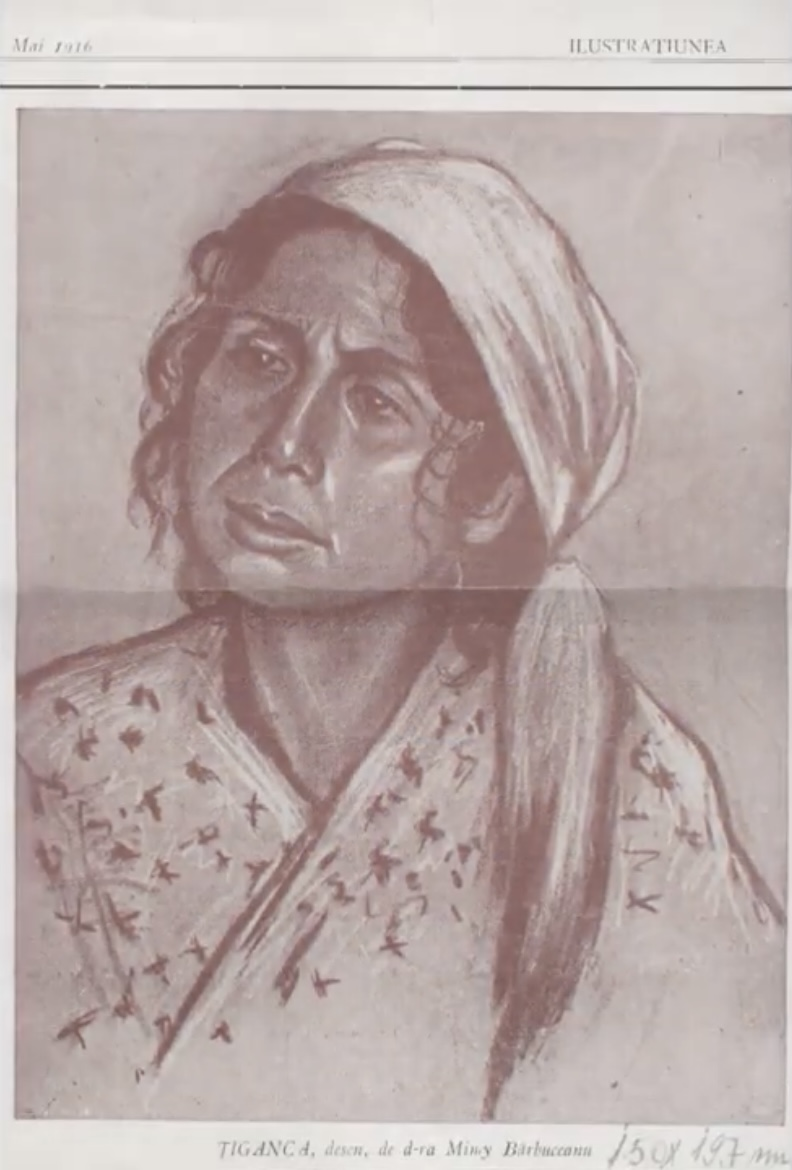
- 1916 portrait of Rudăreasa
- Born: Wallachia
- Known for: Her fight to abolish Romani slavery through legal means
- Spouse: Nicolae Cincea
- Children: Six children

Ioana Tinculeasa Rudăreasa was a Wallachian Romani woman who fought for the abolition of Slavery in Romania from 1843 to 1856. Born into slavery, Rudăreasa spent over a decade fighting for liberation from slavery through the Wallachian court. Her case illustrates the resistance of the Romanian boyars in preventing abolition and how Roma in the Romanian territories used all legal means available to obtain their freedom.

== Early years ==
Rudăreasa was born in the principality of Wallachia as a Boyash Romani slave of the Wallachian state. During her time as a slave, she was forcefully married to Nicolae Cincea, a Romani slave of the Brăiloiu boyar family. Under the law, Romani women assumed the status of their husbands, thus making Rudăreasa a slave of the Brăiloiu family. During her marriage with Cincea, Rudăreasa had a total of six children. According to Adrian-Nicolae Furtună, this marriage was illegal under the Wallachian law, as Rudăreasa and Cincea belonged to different categories of Romani slaves. The law stated that if a slave master married their slave to the slave of another owner, the slave master would lose any rights to claim them or their children as their property.

== The trial ==
The emancipation law of Wallachia was declared in March 1843, which granted freedom to Romani slaves of the state. Rudăreasa claimed that because she was born a slave of the state, the law granted freedom to her and her six children. However the Brăiloiu boyars refused, insisting that they belonged to their property not the state. Nine months later, in December 1843, Rudăreasa filed a lawsuit against the Brăiloiu boyar family for her and her family's freedom. While originally, a local tribunal ruled in favor of Rudăreasa, officially declaring her a free woman in 1845, boyar Brăiloiu contested the decision and brought the case in front of an appeals court. To prove that she was in fact born a slave of the state, Rudăreasa brought witnesses from her childhood, however, their testimonies were dismissed as Romani slaves did not have the right to bear testimony in front of a court of law. The appeals court reversed the ruling of the local tribunal, ruling that Rudăreasa and her children were in fact property of the Brăiloiu family and this the emancipation law did not apply to them. But, Rudăreasa did not give up hope, throughout over 10 years of legal documents, there is no indication of her wishing to resign her case against the boyar. Her lawyer and her fought all the way to the supreme court of Wallachia. The court declared her and her children, once and for all, “free from slavery.”

”With tears in my eyes I fall to Your Magnificent most high mercy, to give enlightened commandment to appear into the justices, and after my rights will be recognized, to obtain salvation from the slavery that they want to do me without proves, more virtuous that neither my parents were, nor of my people was slave.

Your Majesty servant,

Ioana Tinculeasa Rudăreasa”

== Legacy ==
Adrian-Nicolae Furtună states that the case of Ioana Rudăreasa is representative of “several other Romani slaves’ efforts to challenge their masters through the legal means available to them at the time.” Her efforts in fighting for freedom are important to the history of Romanian Roma. The case also demonstrates the lasting self-interest of the boyars in their attempts to keep their slaves. Rudăreasa's freedom was granted three years before the final abolition of slavery in Romania on 20 February 1856, which finally freed the slaves of the Romanian boyars.

== See also ==
- Romani people in Romania
