= Dan Mircea Ionel =

American electrical engineer

Dan Ionel
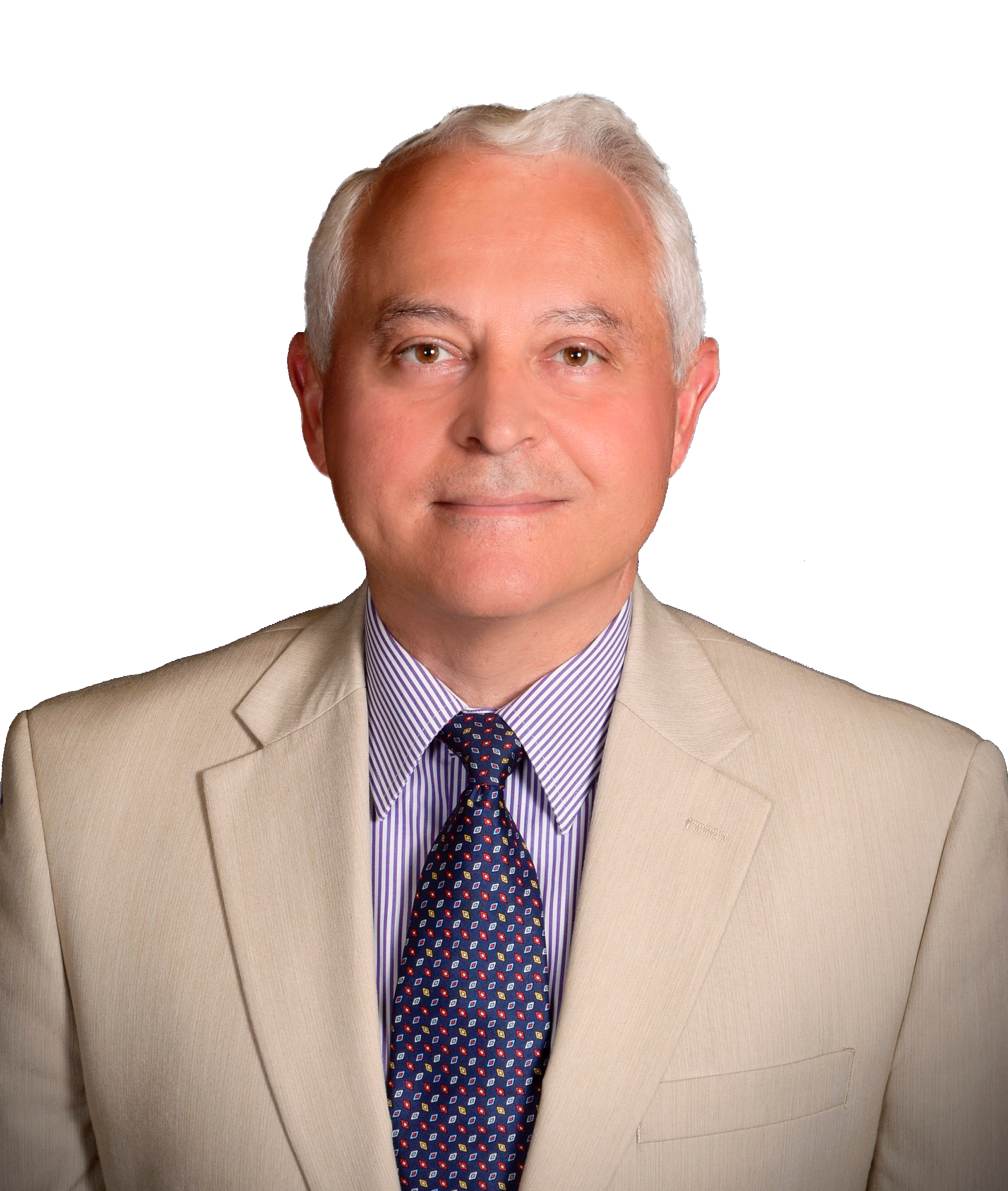
- Professor Dan M. Ionel
- Born: Dan Mircea Ionel
- Education: Politehnica University of Bucharest; University of Bath; University of Glasgow
- Organization: University of Kentucky
- Known for: Electric machine, Wind turbine, Renewable energy, Power system
- Title: Professor, IEEE Fellow, the L. Stanley Pigman Chair in Power, and the Director of the SPARK Laboratory
- Google Scholar entry for Dan Ionel
- ORCID
- Website: SPARK Laboratory

Dan Mircea Ionel is Professor of electrical engineer, the L. Stanley Pigman Chair in Power, and the Director of the SPARK Laboratory and of the PEIK Institute at the University of Kentucky, Lexington, KY. Professor Ionel's research includes the electric machines, wind turbines, power system, applications of power electronics, smart buildings. By the number of citations, he is among the world top 2% highly cited researchers.

== Education and career ==
Professor Dan M. Ionel received the M.Eng. and Ph.D. degrees in electrical engineering from the Politehnica University of Bucharest, Romania. His doctoral program included a Leverhulme Visiting Fellowship at the University of Bath, England. He was a Postdoctoral Researcher with the SPEED Laboratory, University of Glasgow, Scotland. He previously worked in industry, most recently as Chief Engineer for Regal Rexnord Corporation, and, before that, as the Chief Scientist for Vestas Wind Turbines. Concurrently, Dr. Ionel was also a Visiting and Research Professor at the University of Wisconsin and Marquette University in Milwaukee, WI.

He contributed to technological developments with long lasting industrial impact, including US' most successful range of PM motor drives and one of the world's most powerful wind turbines, and holds more than thirty patents, including a medal winner at the Geneva Invention Fair. Dr. Ionel co-authored three books and published more than two hundred papers, including five winners of IEEE Best Paper Awards. He received the CG Veinott Award, the highest distinction for electromechanical energy conversion from the IEEE Power and Energy Society.

His research has been supported by NSF, DOE, NIST, NASA, and directly by leading industrial companies and utilities. He taught and advised student research on subjects of sustainable and renewable energy technologies, electric machines and power electronic drives, electromagnetic devices, electric power systems, smart grids and buildings. Dr. Ionel is an IEEE Fellow, was the inaugural Chair of the IEEE Industry Applications Society Renewable and Sustainable Energy Conversion Systems Committee, Chair of the IEEE Power and Energy Society Electric Motor Subcommittee, Editor of IEEE Transactions on Sustainable Energy, Technical Program Chair of the IEEE ECCE 2015 Congress, and the General Chair of the IEEE IEMDC Conference 2017 Anniversary Edition. He is the Editor-in-Chief of the Electric Power Components and Systems Journal from and the Chair of the Steering Committee for the IEEE IEMDC Series of Conferences.

== Awards ==
- IEEE PES Cyril Veinott Electromechanical Energy Conversion Award, 2020
- Fellow, IEEE, 2013

== Selected books ==
- Blaabjerg, F. and Ionel, D.M. eds., 2017. Renewable energy devices and systems with simulations in matlab® and ansys®. CRC Press.
- Rosu, M., Zhou, P., Lin, D., Ionel, D.M., Popescu, M., Blaabjerg, F., Rallabandi, V. and Staton, D., 2017. Multiphysics simulation by design for electrical machines, power electronics and drives. John Wiley & Sons.

== Selected publications ==
Also see The SPARK Laboratory

- Y. Duan and D. M. Ionel, "A Review of Recent Developments in Electrical Machine Design Optimization Methods With a Permanent-Magnet Synchronous Motor Benchmark Study," in IEEE Transactions on Industry Applications, vol. 49, no. 3, pp. 1268–1275, May–June 2013.
- D. M. Ionel, M. Popescu, M. I. McGilp, T. J. E. Miller, S. J. Dellinger and R. J. Heideman, "Computation of Core Losses in Electrical Machines Using Improved Models for Laminated Steel," in IEEE Transactions on Industry Applications, vol. 43, no. 6, pp. 1554–1564, Nov.-dec. 2007.
- D. M. Ionel, M. Popescu, S. J. Dellinger, T. J. E. Miller, R. J. Heideman and M. I. McGilp, "On the variation with flux and frequency of the core loss coefficients in electrical machines," in IEEE Transactions on Industry Applications, vol. 42, no. 3, pp. 658–667, May–June 2006.
- D. G. Dorrell, M. Popescu and D. M. Ionel, "Unbalanced Magnetic Pull Due to Asymmetry and Low-Level Static Rotor Eccentricity in Fractional-Slot Brushless Permanent-Magnet Motors With Surface-Magnet and Consequent-Pole Rotors," in IEEE Transactions on Magnetics, vol. 46, no. 7, pp. 2675–2685, July 2010.
- A. Boglietti, A. Cavagnino, D. M. Ionel, M. Popescu, D. A. Staton and S. Vaschetto, "A General Model to Predict the Iron Losses in PWM Inverter-Fed Induction Motors," in IEEE Transactions on Industry Applications, vol. 46, no. 5, pp. 1882–1890, Sept.-Oct. 2010.
- G. Y. Sizov, D. M. Ionel and N. A. O. Demerdash, "Modeling and Parametric Design of Permanent-Magnet AC Machines Using Computationally Efficient Finite-Element Analysis," in IEEE Transactions on Industrial Electronics, vol. 59, no. 6, pp. 2403–2413, June 2012.
- Blaabjerg, Frede, and Dan M. Ionel. "Renewable energy devices and systems–state-of-the-art technology, research and development, challenges and future trends." Electric Power Components and Systems, vol. 43, no. 12 (2015): 1319-1328.
- P. Zhang, G. Y. Sizov, J. He, D. M. Ionel and N. A. O. Demerdash, "Calculation of Magnet Losses in Concentrated-Winding Permanent-Magnet Synchronous Machines Using a Computationally Efficient Finite-Element Method," in IEEE Transactions on Industry Applications, vol. 49, no. 6, pp. 2524–2532, Nov.-Dec. 2013.
- M. Popescu, D. M. Ionel, A. Boglietti, A. Cavagnino, C. Cossar and M. I. McGilp, "A General Model for Estimating the Laminated Steel Losses Under PWM Voltage Supply," in IEEE Transactions on Industry Applications, vol. 46, no. 4, pp. 1389–1396, July-Aug. 2010.
- D. M. Ionel, M. Popescu, M. I. McGilp, T. J. E. Miller and S. J. Dellinger, "Assessment of torque components in brushless permanent-magnet machines through numerical analysis of the electromagnetic field," in IEEE Transactions on Industry Applications, vol. 41, no. 5, pp. 1149–1158, Sept.-Oct. 2005.
- D. M. Ionel and M. Popescu, "Finite-Element Surrogate Model for Electric Machines With Revolving Field—Application to IPM Motors," in IEEE Transactions on Industry Applications, vol. 46, no. 6, pp. 2424–2433, Nov.-Dec. 2010.
- G. Y. Sizov, P. Zhang, D. M. Ionel, N. A. O. Demerdash and M. Rosu, "Automated Multi-Objective Design Optimization of PM AC Machines Using Computationally Efficient FEA and Differential Evolution," in IEEE Transactions on Industry Applications, vol. 49, no. 5, pp. 2086–2096, Sept.-Oct. 2013.
- S. Choi et al., "Fault Diagnosis Techniques for Permanent Magnet AC Machine and Drives—A Review of Current State of the Art," in IEEE Transactions on Transportation Electrification, vol. 4, no. 2, pp. 444–463, June 2018.
- M. Popescu and D. M. Ionel, "A Best-Fit Model of Power Losses in Cold Rolled-Motor Lamination Steel Operating in a Wide Range of Frequency and Magnetization," in IEEE Transactions on Magnetics, vol. 43, no. 4, pp. 1753–1756, April 2007.
- A. Fatemi, N. A. O. Demerdash, T. W. Nehl and D. M. Ionel, "Large-Scale Design Optimization of PM Machines Over a Target Operating Cycle," in IEEE Transactions on Industry Applications, vol. 52, no. 5, pp. 3772–3782, Sept.-Oct. 2016.
- P. Zhang et al., "Multi-Objective Tradeoffs in the Design Optimization of a Brushless Permanent-Magnet Machine With Fractional-Slot Concentrated Windings," in IEEE Transactions on Industry Applications, vol. 50, no. 5, pp. 3285–3294.
- V. Rallabandi, O. M. Akeyo, N. Jewell and D. M. Ionel, "Incorporating Battery Energy Storage Systems Into Multi-MW Grid Connected PV Systems," in IEEE Transactions on Industry Applications, vol. 55, no. 1, pp. 638–647, Jan.-Feb. 2019.

== Selected patents ==
- Ionel, D.M., AO Smith Corp, 2011. Interior permanent magnet motor including rotor with flux barriers. U.S. Patent 7,932,658.
- Ionel, D.M., Dellinger, S.J., Lesak, A.E. and Mattingly, J., AO Smith Corp, 2011. Interior permanent magnet motor and rotor. U.S. Patent 7,923,881.
- Ionel, D.M., Dellinger, S.J., Heideman, R.J. and Lesak, A.E., AO Smith Corp, 2010. Stator assembly for an electric machine and method of manufacturing the same. U.S. Patent 7,821,175.
- Ionel, D.M., AO Smith Corp, 2011. Interior permanent magnet motor including rotor with flux barriers. U.S. Patent 7,932,658.
- Ionel, D.M., Heideman, R.J. and Bartos, R.P., AO Smith Corp, 2006. Spoke permanent magnet rotors for electrical machines and methods of manufacturing same. U.S. Patent 7,148,598.
- Heideman, R.J. and Ionel, D.M., AO Smith Corp, 2007. Spoke permanent magnet rotor. U.S. Patent 7,157,827.
- Ionel, D.M. and Lesak, A.E., AO Smith Corp, 2010. Electric machine, stator assembly for an electric machine, and method of manufacturing the same. U.S. Patent 7,687,965.
- Ionel, D.M., Dellinger, S.J. and Lesak, A.E., AO Smith Corp, 2007. Electric motor having a stator. U.S. Patent US20050017590A1
- Ionel, D.M., and Dellinger, S.J., O Smith Corp, 2005. Brushless permanent magnet machine with axial modules of rotor magnetization skew and method of producing the same. U.S. Patent 7,247,967.
- Ionel, D.M., Dellinger, S.J., Heideman, R.J. and Lesak, A.E., AO Smith Corp, 2011. Rotor assembly having two core portions each with a reduced back portion. U.S. Patent 8,035,273.
