= Ionela =

Ionela is a Romanian feminine given name. Notable people with the name include:

- Ionela Loaieş (born 1979), Romanian artistic gymnast
- Ionela Stanca-Galca (born 1981), Romanian team handball player
- Ionela Târlea (born 1976), Romanian track and field athlete
