= Ionuț Dobroiu =

Romanian footballer

Personal information
- Full name: Ionuț Alexandru Dobroiu
- Date of birth: 24 February 1988 (age 38)
- Place of birth: București, România
- Height: 1.84 m (6 ft 0 in)
- Position: Forward

Senior career*
Years	Team	Apps	(Gls)
2004–2006	Rapid II București		
2007–2011	Rapid București	9	(1)
2009	→ CSM Râmnicu Vâlcea (loan)	1	(0)
2011	→ Pandurii Târgu Jiu (loan)	0	(0)
Total		10	(1)

International career
2009	Romania U21	3	(0)
- * Club domestic league appearances and goals

Ionuț Alexandru Dobroiu (born 24 February 1988, București) is a Romanian former professional footballer who played as a forward.

== Career ==
Ionuț Dobroiu was born on 24 February 1988 in Bucharest and his first sport practiced was athletics at the age of 7, winning major junior Romanian national competitions. He started playing football at Rapid București, making his Divizia A debut on 12 August 2007 for the club when coach Cristiano Bergodi used him in a 2–1 away victory against Universitatea Cluj. He scored his only Divizia A goal in a 2–0 home victory against Universitatea Craiova. Dobroiu was known for his speed, at a point reaching 5.2 seconds in a 50 metres sprint but also for his lack of discipline.

== Conviction ==
Ionuț Dobroiu was sentenced in 2018 to a jail term of three years and 11 months for continuous high risk drug trafficking, formation of an organized criminal group, possession and consumption of high risk drugs. He executed his term at the Rahova penitentiary, being in the same cell with former footballer Răzvan Pădurețu and former Politehnica Timișoara owner, Marian Iancu. Dobroiu was released after two years and four months spent in jail.
