= Younan =

Younan may refer to the following:

== People ==
=== Given name ===
- Younan Labib Rizk (1933–2008), Egyptian historian and literary figure
- Younan Nowzaradan, or Dr Now, an Iranian-American surgeon, TV personality, and author
- Younan Xia (born 1965), a Chinese-American chemist, materials scientist, and bioengineer

=== Surname ===
- Faia Younan (born 1992), a Syrian singer
- Ignatius Joseph III Yonan (or Younan), Syriac Catholic Patriarch of Antioch
- Larsa Pippen (née Younan, born 1974), American television personality
- Munib Younan (born 1950), a Palestinian bishop of the Evangelical Lutheran Church in Jordan and the Holy Land
- Ramses Younan (1913–1966), an Egyptian painter and writer

== See also ==
- Younan (یونان), the Persian designation for Greek, a transliteration of Ionia
