= McCone =

McCone is a surname. Notable people with the surname include:

- John A. McCone (1902–1991), American businessman, politician and CIA director from 1961 to 1965
- Ryan McCone (born 1987), New Zealand cricketer

Fictional characters:

- Alexander Hamilton McCone, fictional character of Kurt Vonnegut's Jailbird
- Daniel McCone, fictional millionaire of Kurt Vonnegut's Jailbird, father of Alexander Hamilton McCone
- Evan McCone, fictional character of Richard Bachman's The Running Man
- Gina McCone, fictional character of Stephen King's The Stand
- Sharon McCone, fictional detective created by Marcia Muller

== Other ==
- McCone County, Montana, named in honor of State Senator George McCone.

== See also ==
- McCown
- McCowen
- McCune (surname)
- McEwan
- McEwen
- McKeon
- McKeown
- McKone
