= McKone =

McKone is an Anglicised Irish surname McKeon. Notable people with the name include:

- Mike McKone, British comic book artist
- John McKone (1835–1882), Australian cricketer

== See also ==
- McKeon
- McKeen (surname)
- McKean (surname)
- Mac Eoin Bissett family
- McCune (surname)
- McCunn
- MacEwen
