= McKeon =

McKeon and MacKeon are Irish surnames originating both from the Gaelic Mac Eoghain ("Son of Eoghan") and Mac Eoin ("Son of John"), which are pronounced identically. Other variants in English include MacEoin and McKeown. Notable people with the name include:

- Alistair McKeon, fictional character in the Honorverse
- Beverley McKeon, British physicist and aerospace engineer
- Emma McKeon (born 1994), Australian Olympic swimmer
- Howard "Buck" McKeon (born 1938), American politician
- Jack McKeon (born 1930), American baseball manager and executive
- John McKeon (1808–1883), New York lawyer and politician, U.S. Representative
- John F. McKeon (born 1958), American politician
- Kaylee McKeown (born 2001), Australian Olympic swimmer
- Larry McKeon (1944–2008), American politician
- Lindsey McKeon (born 1982), American actress
- Matt McKeon (born 1974), American soccer player
- Matthew McKeon (1924–2003), U.S. Marine
- Myles McKeon (1919–2016), Roman Catholic bishop
- Nancy McKeon (born 1966), American actress
- Philip McKeon (1964–2019), American actor (and brother of Nancy McKeon)
- Richard McKeon (1900–1985), American philosopher
- Scott McKeon, British blues rock guitarist, songwriter, singer, and music tutor
- Sean McKeon (born 1997), American football player
- Stephen McKeon, Irish film music composer

== See also ==
- McKone
- McKeen (surname)
- McKean (surname)
- Mac Eoin Bissett family
- McCune (surname)
- McCunn
- MacEwen
