= McKean =

McKean may refer to:

== Places ==
- McKean, Pennsylvania
- McKean County, Pennsylvania
- McKean Island, island in the Phoenix Islands, Republic of Kiribati
- McKean Township (disambiguation)

== Other uses ==
- McKean (surname), people with the surname McKean
- USS McKean, two historical US Naval ships

== See also ==
- McKeen (disambiguation)
