= McGeown =

McGeown is a surname. Notable people with the surname include:

- Eimear McGeown (born 1983), flautist
- Mark McGeown (born 1970), Scottish footballer
- Mollie McGeown (1923–2004), Northern Irish nephrologist and biochemist
- Pat McGeown (1956–1996), Irish republican

== See also ==
- McGown (disambiguation)
- McKeown
