= McGown =

McGown may refer to:

== People ==
- Carl McGown, volleyball coach
- Claudia McGown, murder victim in the Fischer Projects of New Orleans
- Doris Elizabeth McGown, better known as Doris Angleton, Texas socialite and murder victim
- Edward McGown, British director of the movie Bachelor Games
- Eva McGown (1883–1972), Official Hostess of Fairbanks, Alaska
- Jill McGown (1947–2007), British mystery writer
- Ken McGown (1936–2010), Australian rules footballer
- Lea McGown, motel manager and witness in the Oklahoma City bombing
- Pearl McGown (1891–1983), American hooked rug designer and teacher, known for establishing the McGown Teacher Workshop
- Rhoderick McGown (born 1972), Zimbabwean swimmer
- Richard McGown (born 1937), Scottish-Zimbabwean former anaesthetist, murderer, and suspected serial killer
- Rima Berns-McGown, Canadian politician
- Stephen Malcolm McGown, South African victim in the 2011 Timbuktu kidnapping
- Tom McGown (1876–1956), Irish international rugby player

=== Fictional people ===
- Jay McGown, a character in the 1961 novel The Gay Place

== Places ==
- McGown Lakes, a group of lakes in Custer County, Idaho
- McGown Peak, a peak in the Sawtooth Range of Idaho
- McGown's Pass Tavern, a 19th-century tavern in New York's Central Park

== See also ==
- McGowan
- McCown
- Gown (disambiguation)
