= Malcolm (given name) =

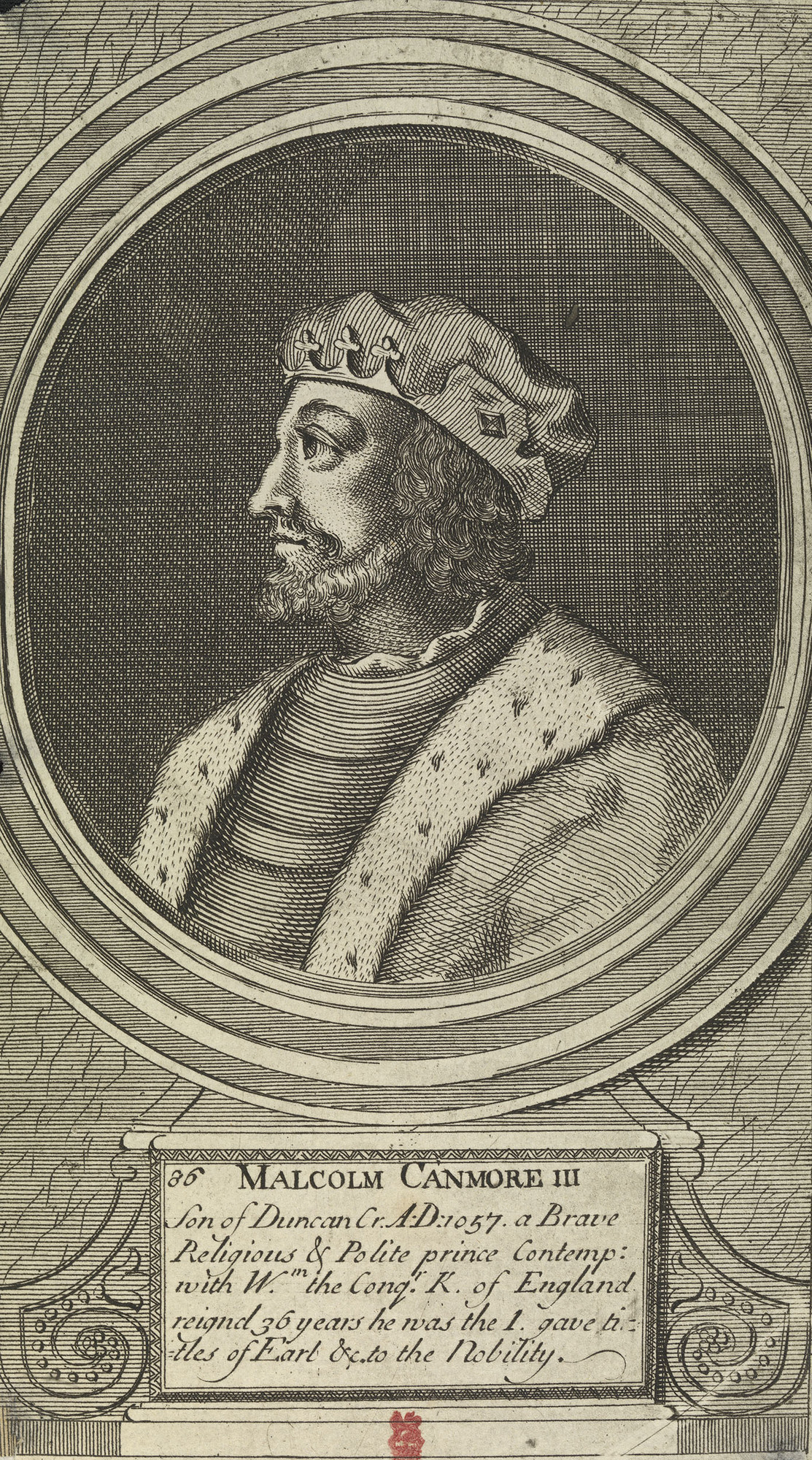
- Depiction of Malcolm III of Scotland
- Gender: Male

Origin
- Meaning: Devotee of Saint Columba
- Region of origin: Scotland

Malcolm, Malcom, Máel Coluim, or Maol Choluim is a Scottish Gaelic given name meaning "devotee of Saint Columba". Maol "shavenhead" is Scottish Gaelic for monk.

== Literature ==
- Malcolm Azania, Canadian teacher, writer, community activist, radio host, and political aspirant
- Malcolm Bradbury (1932–2000), British author and academic
- Malcolm Cowley (1898–1989), American novelist, poet, literary critic, and journalist
- Malcolm Forbes (1919–1990), American publisher of Forbes magazine
- Malcolm Lowry (1909–1957), English poet and novelist
- Malcolm Muir (publisher) (1885–1979), American magazine industrialist
- Malcolm Wheeler-Nicholson (1890–1968), American pulp magazine writer and entrepreneur

== Music ==
- Malcolm Archer (born 1952), English organist, conductor, and composer
- Malcolm Arnold (1921–2006), British composer
- Malcolm Bilson (born 1935), American pianist
- Malcolm Burn (born 1960), Canadian musician
- Malcolm Catto, English drummer and musician
- Malcolm Clarke (composer) (1943–2003), British composer
- Malcolm Forsyth (1936–2011), Canadian musician
- Malcolm Goldstein (born 1936), American violinist
- Malcolm David Kelley (born 1992), American rapper mostly known for MKTO, and actor
- Malcolm McCormick (1992–2018), birth name of Mac Miller, American rapper, singer and songwriter
- Malcolm McLaren (1946–2010), English musician and producer of the Sex Pistols
- Malcolm Middleton (born 1973), Scottish musician
- Malcolm Mooney, African-American rock music singer, poet, and artist
- Malcolm Peyton (1932–2025), American composer, concert director, conductor, and teacher
- Malcolm Rebennack (1941–2019), birth name of Dr. John, American singer and songwriter
- Malcolm Sargent (1895–1967), British conductor, organist, and composer
- Malcolm Todd (born 2003), American singer-songwriter, musician
- Malcolm Williamson (1931–2003), Australian composer
- Malcolm Young (1953–2017), Australian rhythm guitarist for AC/DC

== Politics ==
- Malcolm Baldrige Jr. (1922–1987), American politician and 26th United States Secretary of Commerce
- Malcolm Bruce (born 1944), Scottish politician
- Malcolm Caldwell (1931–1978), British academic and communist intellectual and a strong supporter of Pol Pot's rule in Democratic Kampuchea
- Lord Malcolm Douglas-Hamilton (1909–1964), Scottish politician and aviator
- Malcolm Fraser (1930–2015), 22nd Prime Minister of Australia
- Malcolm H. Kerr (1931–1984), American political scientist and teacher who was an expert on Middle East politics
- Malcolm MacDonald (1901–1981), British politician and diplomat
- Malcolm Mackerras (born 1939), Australian psephologist and commentator and lecturer on Australian and American politics
- Malcolm MacInnis (1933–2023), Canadian politician
- Malcolm Offord, Scottish financier and politician
- Malcolm Rifkind (born 1946), Scottish Conservative and Unionist politician
- Malcolm Shepherd, 2nd Baron Shepherd (1918–2001), British politician, leader of the Labour Party in the House of Lords, 1974 to 1976
- Malcolm Sinclair, 20th Earl of Caithness, British Conservative politician and member of the House of Lords
- Malcolm Turnbull (born 1954), Prime Minister of Australia (2015–2018)
- Malcolm Wallop (1933–2011), American politician and United States Senator
- Malcolm Wicks (1947–2012), English politician
- Malcolm X (1925–1965), Afro-American civil rights leader and Nation of Islam minister

== Religion ==
- Malcolm Muggeridge (1903–1990), British journalist, author, satirist, media personality, soldier, spy, and Christian scholar
- Malcolm Ranjith (born 1947), 11th Archbishop of Colombo

== Sports ==
- Malcolm Allen (swimmer), Australian freestyle swimmer
- Malcolm Allison (1927–2010), English footballer and football manager
- Malcolm Bunche (born 1991), American football player
- Malcolm Butler (born 1990), American football player
- Malcolm Cameron, Miami Dolphins head coach (better known as "Cam" Cameron)
- Malcom Chalmers, Australian Paralympic swimmer
- Malcolm Campbell (1885–1948), English racing motorist and motoring journalist
- Malcolm Champion, New Zealand swimmer, that country's first Olympic gold medallist
- Malcolm DeWalt (born 2002), American football player
- Malcolm Elliott (born 1961), English professional cyclist
- Malcom Floyd (born 1981), American football wide receiver
- Malcolm Glazer (1928–2014), American businessman and sports-team owner
- Malcolm Hill (basketball), American in the Israel Basketball Premier League
- Malcolm Hunter (born 1950), Canadian cross-country skier
- Malcolm Jenkins (born 1987), American football player
- Malcolm Koonce (born 1998), American football player
- Malcolm Lee (basketball) (born 1990), American basketball player
- Malcolm Macdonald (born 1950), English footballer and football manager
- Malcolm Marshall (1958–1999), Barbadian cricketer
- Malcolm McPhail (1895–1975), Scottish footballer
- Malcolm Poole, Australian field hockey player
- Malcolm Reilly, British rugby league player and coach
- Malcolm Roach (born 1998), American football player
- Malcolm Sampson, English rugby league footballer who played in the 1950s, 1960s and 1970s
- Malcolm Simpson (1933–2020), New Zealand cyclist
- Malcolm Spence (ice hockey) (born 2006), Canadian ice hockey player
- Malcolm Thomas (born 1988), American professional basketball player
- Malcom Adu Ares (born 2001), Spanish footballer
- Malcom Filipe Silva de Oliveira, Brazilian footballer
- Malcolm Shaw (soccer) (born 1995), Canadian soccer player
- Malcolm Smith, American football player and MVP of Super Bowl XLVIII
- Malcolm Subban, Canadian hockey goaltender

== Television and film ==
- Malcolm Lee Beggs (1907–1956), American actor
- Malcolm Danare (born 1962), American actor, producer and writer
- Malcolm Gets (born 1964), American actor
- Malcolm Hulke (1924–1979), English screenwriter
- Malcolm David Kelley (born 1992), American rapper, singer, songwriter and actor
- Malcolm D. Lee (born 1970), American director, producer and screenwriter
- Malcolm McDowell (born 1943), English actor and producer
- Malcolm McFee (1949–2001), English actor
- Malcolm Spellman, American screenwriter and producer
- Malcolm-Jamal Warner (1970–2025), American actor, director, producer and singer

== Other ==
- Malcolm I of Scotland
- Malcolm II of Scotland
- Malcolm III of Scotland
- Malcolm IV of Scotland
- Malcolm Barber (born 1943), English historian
- Malcolm Bowie (1943–2007), British academic
- Malcolm Bricklin (born 1939), American automotive entrepreneur
- Malcolm Browne (1931–2012), American journalist and photographer
- Malcolm Cole (1949–1995), Aboriginal dancer and teacher at NAISDA Dance College, Sydney
- Malcolm Fairley (born 1952), British criminal and sex offender
- Malcolm Garrett (born 1956), British graphic designer
- Malcolm Gladwell (born 1963), Canadian journalist
- Malcom Glenn (born 1987), American writer and journalist
- Malcolm Hardee (1950–2005), English comedian
- Malcolm Kendall-Smith, unit medical officer with the British Royal Air Force, court-martialled during the Iraq War
- Malcolm Kilduff (1927–2003), American journalist
- Malcolm Laycock (1938–2009), British radio presenter and producer
- Malcolm Longair (born 1941), British physicist
- Malcolm McKeown, Ulster loyalist and career criminal
- Malcom McLean (1913–2001), American entrepreneur
- Malcolm Molyneux (1943–2021), British malaria researcher
- Malcolm B. Montgomery (1891–1974), Justice of the Supreme Court of Mississippi
- Malcolm Morley (artist) (1931–2018), English-born artist now living in the United States
- Malcolm Perry (disambiguation), multiple people
- Malcolm Sayer (1916–1970), British automobile designer
- Sir Malcolm Stewart, 1st Baronet (1872–1951), British industrialist and philanthropist, founder of The London Brick Company
- Malcolm Wood, British-Chinese entrepreneur and restaurateur

== Fictional characters ==
- Malcolm Wilkerson, prodigy son and title character of the early 2000s American television single-camera sitcom Malcolm in the Middle
- Malcolm, one of the two main characters in the American black-and-white romantic drama movie Malcolm & Marie
- Malcolm Butler, one of the main characters on The Neighborhood
- Malcolm Bright, protagonist of Prodigal Son
- Malcolm Dresden, father of Harry Dresden in The Dresden Files
- Malcolm McDuck, a Disney character who is an ancestor of Scrooge McDuck and Donald Duck
- Malcolm Merlyn, a major villain in the superhero television series Arrow
- Malcolm Pace, character from Percy Jackson & the Olympians
- Malcolm Reed, in the television series Star Trek: Enterprise
- Malcolm Reynolds, in the science fiction television series Firefly
- Malcolm "Mac" Scorpio, a character in the American daytime drama General Hospital
- Malcolm Tucker, in Armando Iannucci's The Thick of It and In the Loop
- Malcolm Fitzcarraldo, the secret identity of Monarch in Venture Bros
- Malcolm, human character in Dawn of the Planet of the Apes
- P.C. Malcolm Williams, police constable and supporting character in Fireman Sam

== Surname ==
- Collin Malcolm (born 1997), American basketball player the Israeli Basketball Premier League

== See also ==
- List of Scottish Gaelic given names
- Malky (given name), diminutive of Malcolm
