= McConn =

McConn is a surname. Notable people with the surname include:

- Brittney McConn (born 1980), American figure skater
- Jim McConn (1928–1997), American businessman and mayor

== See also ==
- McCann (surname)
- McCunn
