= Claire Murray =

Claire Murray may refer to:

- Claire McCusker Murray (born 1982), American lawyer and associate White House counsel
- Claire Murray (entrepreneur) (died 2026), American artist and businesswoman
