= McHone =

McHone is a surname. Notable people with the surname include:

- Carson McHone, American singer-songwriter and musician
- Morris McHone (born 1943), American basketball player and coach
- Steven Van McHone (1970–2005), American murderer

== See also ==
- 29146 McHone, minor planet
- McCone
