= Thomas McEwan =

Thomas or Tom McEwan may refer to:

- Thomas McEwan Jr. (1854–1926), American politician from New Jersey
- Thomas McEwan (painter) (1846–1914), Scottish painter
- Tom McEwan (whitewater kayaker) (born 1946), American whitewater kayaker
- Tom McEwan (footballer) (1885–1958), Australian rules footballer
- Tom McEwan (bookbinder), Scottish master craftsman and bookbinder
