= USS McKean =

Two ships of the United States Navy have been named USS McKean, in honor of William McKean.

- USS McKean (DD-90), was a Wickes-class destroyer, converted to APD-5 for service in World War II.
- USS McKean (DD-784), was a Gearing-class destroyer during World War II.
