= McKeand =

McKeand is a Scottish surname. Notable people with the surname include:

- Hannah McKeand (born 1973), British polar explorer
- Les McKeand (1924–1978), Australian triple jumper and javelin thrower

== See also ==
- McKean (surname)
