= McKeen =

McKeen may refer to:

- McKeen (surname)
- McKeen, Illinois, an unincorporated community in the United States
- McKeen Motor Car Company, a defunct American railcar manufacturer
- McKeen railmotor

== See also ==
- McKean (disambiguation)
