= McMeel =

McMeel is a surname. Notable people with the surname include:

- Cortright McMeel (1971–2013), American writer
- Noel McMeel (fl. late 20th–early 21st century), Northern Irish chef

== See also ==
- McKeel
- McMeen
