= McMeen =

McMeen is a surname. Notable people with the surname include:

- El McMeen (born 1947), American guitarist
- Marilyn McMeen Miller Brown (born 1938), American writer

== See also ==
- McKeen (surname)
- McMeel
