= Claire Murray (entrepreneur) =

American businessperson (died 2026)

Claire Murray (died April 15, 2026) was an American artist and businesswoman. She was the founder of Claire Murray Lifestyles, a company which sold hooked rugs and coastal-inspired home decor.

Murray died in Pacific Grove, California on April 15, 2026, at the age of 83.
