= McCown =

- Language: Goidelic

Origin
- Meaning: Son of (Various)

McCown is a Goidelic surname with several possible etymological origins.

== Etymology ==
There are several possible etymologies for McCown. McCown is a patronymic surname, the Gaelic Mac (or Mc) meaning "son of" in English.

=== Mac Còmhghan ===
The name Còmhghan and its variants ( Còmhan, Comhainn, Còmhain ) is derived from comh ("together") and gan-, gen- ("born"). a.k.a. Twins and is frequently associated with the surname Cowan. The name Mac Giolla Còmhghan, translates into English as son of the servant of Comhghain. This generally translates to mean follower of St. Comgan. St. Comgan was the son of Cellach Cualann, brother of St. Caintigerna and uncle of St. Fillan. One of the King of Scots, Lulach Mac Gille Coemgáin had this name. Mac Giolla Còmhghan is frequently associated with the anglicized surname McElhone. Phonetically, McElhone seems similar to Mac Colquhoun.

=== Mac Eachainn ===
MacEachainn is a Pictish name of Galloway, Scotland.

=== Mac Eòin ===
The name Eòin is a Gaelic form of John. Mac Eoin often anglicized as (McKeon/McKeown) is thought to have derived, in some cases, from Mac Eoin Bissett.

=== Mac Gobhainn ===
In Ireland and Scotland, the word for smith, gobha, is found in the surname MacGowan/McGowan. This surname is an Anglicised form of Mac Gobhann (Scottish Gaelic), Mac Gabhann (Irish), meaning "son of the smith".

=== Other possibilities ===
Other possible derivations of the name may come from the Manx language word Cowan and its variants (Cowanagh, Coan, Couan) which are defined as either a shelter between two hills, or inhabitant of the plains. In Old Irish, cúan means bay, gulf, harbour or sea. The name Cuan can also mean a little warrior and tends to be synonymous with the names Quain, Quane, and Quan.

== Clan Associations ==
In contemporary Scottish clan societies and at Highland games, those with the surname McCown may declare allegiance to Clan Campbell.

== Persons with the surname ==
- Bob McCown, (born 1952) American-born Canadian, sports talk show personality
- Clint McCown, (born 1952), American author and university professor
- Cort McCown (born 1964), American actor
- Francis Timothy McCown, also known as Rory Calhoun, (1922–1999) American, television actor
- Hale McCown (1914–2005), justice of the Nebraska Supreme Court
- Jennie McCowen (1845–1924), American physician, writer, lecturer, medical journal editor, suffragist
- John P. McCown, (1815–1879) American, Confederate States Army general
- Josh McCown, (born 1979) American, professional American football player
- Luke McCown, (born 1981) American, professional American football player
- Owen McCown (born 2003), American football player
- Randy McCown, (born 1977) American, college football player

== Other ==
- Thick-billed longspur (Rhynchophanes mccownii), formerly known as McCown's longspur, is a small ground-feeding bird.
- Starkville Park: Honors civil rights activist John McCown
- McCownville, Texas: Ladonia Texas used to be named McCownville
- McKownville: Heavily developed suburb of Albany County, New York
