= Nancy Edell =

Canadian artist (1942-2005)

- Born: November 12, 1942; Omaha, Nebraska
- Died: June 9, 2005 (aged 62); Halifax, Nova Scotia
- Known for: artist
- Spouse: Peter Walker

Nancy Edell (November 12, 1942 – June 9, 2005) was an American-born Canadian artist, best known for her rug hooking practice that challenged the boundaries between art and craft. Her practice included animated film, woodcut, monotypes and drawing which often expressed surrealist themes. Edell believed an artist's work should be an expression of their personal experience. Her work was rooted in feminism and drew inspiration from her dreams, religion and politics. Her work is recognized for its dream-like qualities, art historical references, sensuality, sexuality, narrative and subversive wit.

== Life and education ==
Nancy Edell was born in Omaha, Nebraska, on November 12, 1942. Edell obtained her Bachelor of Fine Arts in printmaking and contemporary dance from the University of Nebraska Omaha in 1964. By the time Edell was in her 20s, she had lived in Los Angeles, California, Victoria, British Columbia, and then Bristol, England where she continued her cinematic works and studies.

From 1968 to 1969, Edell studied film and animation at the University of Bristol. After Edell's brief time in England, she moved to Winnipeg, Manitoba, where she worked in animation and lithography until 1980.

In 1980, Edell moved to the small village of Bayswater, Nova Scotia, and discovered the traditional domestic craft of rug-hooking which changed her art practice dramatically. As a self-taught artist of rug-hooking, Edell incorporated her feminist approach to art history in her work. Edell became a Canadian citizen in 1981.

In 1982, Edell began teaching part-time at the Nova Scotia College of Art and Design, and continued working there until 2002.

She was diagnosed with non-Hodgkin's Lymphoma in the fall of 1999 and died on June 9, 2005. Edell was married to Peter Walker, and she also has a son, Gabriel Edell, a daughter-in-law, Sarah Maley Edell, and two grandchildren, Hyacinth Edell and Levon Edell.

== Works ==
=== Film ===
In the early 1970s Nancy Edell was acclaimed as one of Canada's foremost animators, though she preferred to be considered an artist. Edell says that most of her early film work was a form of self-therapy, a response to growing up in the 1950s in Nebraska, the "rigid sex-roles" that defined her life and the violence she associated with sex.

"Dirty jokes were my basic childhood reference to sex. Sex is dirty, that kind of stuff. Men grabbing at women and leering. I was just working this out.”

Edell's animation works were screened in numerous places throughout the world including Edinburgh, Oberhausen, Chicago, Amsterdam, Toronto, and Montreal. Edell won awards for her film work from festivals in Paris, France (1972), and Edinburgh, Scotland (1969) as well as the First Festival of Women's Films, New York City (1972), and the Canada Council. Edell had animation commissions from the BBC, CBC, and also Sesame Street. Her first two film animations, Black Pudding and Charley Company, were created using cut-out drawings and lithographic prints. The characters in these films were made from detailed drawings with moving parts that were filmed moving to create the animation.

Edell moved away from work in film animation after the 1980s. However, residues of her animations can be seen in her still work through the "sequencing and fractured narrative structure" and the way she reused and repeated background images, as one would in cel animation.

==== Black Pudding (1969) ====
Black Pudding (1969) was Edells’ first film which she directed, wrote, and animated. The video is 7 minutes long in colour film. It was created during her studies at Bristol University, in England. During this time, many adult-orientated animations were being produced in Europe which spoke to questions of sexuality and social norms. Black Pudding features "a giant vagina belch[ing] out strange, surrealistic, creatures in an endless stream". It is described as an "experimental...dark surrealist fantasy, full of bizarre often erotic imagery and feminist themes". Edell herself explains the creating of Black Pudding as a "really gut things and I just spewed out everything I wanted to say". The name "Black Pudding" became over time, a reference to a woman's insides and sexual organs. When Edell looked back on Black Pudding in an interview with Brian Clancey for Cinema Canada in 1976, she said she found the film embarrassing. "Now, when I look at it, it's embarrassing, because it's so crude. It's really raw stuff".

==== Charley Company (1972) ====
Charley Company was Edell's second film and was created in 1972. It is a 9 min, colour animation. It was inspired by her feelings against war. The film featured a civilian army of sexual-sadistic civilian soldiers "walking up Uncle Sam's ass". Jana Vosikovska, in the program for the film series Canadian Women Filmmakers, describes these characters as "[a] procession of fantastic creatures from the worlds of H. Bosch, R. Crumb and T. Dine". The film also features hermaphrodite-like characters, which Edell attributes to her interest in "dual aspects" and Siamese twins: when two things are joined together in impossible ways.

==== Lunch (1973) ====
Edell's third film Lunch, made in 1973, is a 4-minute colour animation. She received a grant from the BBC. Lunch is a film about a waiter, a chef, and the customers. The idea for the film was initially submitted by a BBC producer, and was about the contrast between the atmosphere of the dining hall and kitchen in a restaurant.

=== Rug Hooking ===
When Edell arrived in Nova Scotia in 1980, rug hooking had formed part of Nova Scotian folk-culture since the 1850s, but it had not yet found a place within fine art. Her move to Nova Scotia signaled a pivotal turn in her work; she started to incorporate the medium of rug hooking into her work, creating a unique visual style. Edell's work with this medium mixes the traditional practices of rug hooking with controversial themes such as feminism, sexuality, and death. She used the narrative possibilities of this medium to express a dream-like quality with art historical references, sensuality, journeys and wit. "Using found wool rag (used clothing) and a traditional method of shrinking, she began to construct images that spoke of enclosed interior (indoor) spaces as related to the gender issue. She explores a socially-constructed gender that is developed through the use of myth (often Assyrian) and stereotype". Rug hooking and other domestic and often textile-based crafts, like quilting, knitting, sewing, and embroidery are often associated with the 'feminine arts'. Because of this association with femininity and the domestic, they were devalued within the male-dominated hierarchy of art. Edell, along with artists like Joyce Wieland, Kate Walker, Eva Hesse, Jackie Winsor, and Miriam Schapiro pushed the boundaries between craft and art in the 1960-80s. They argued the distinction between craft and art was a gendered one.

"Mat hooking aligned Edell with feminist artists of the time who were incorporating folk and craft elements into their fine art practices. It was a choice that established a gender position from which she developed the feminist utopia depicted in her Art Nuns rug-hooking series. With its scenes of a community of celibate women artists devoted to the creation and exploration of art, Art Nuns illustrates Edell's shift to a woman-centered vision. In the 1990s her hooked-rug works grew beyond the familiar format of the enclosed border which was typical of her earlier work. Edell's final body of work has been described as cataclysmic and urgent, depicting pathological processes, micro-organisms and systems of medicine and biology — a response to the terminal cancer that would eventually take her life."

As a printmaker, Edell began to incorporate prints into her rugs and painting in the late 1990s in works such as Syncoryne Mirabilis, 2004. She combines textiles, collage, painting, and carving techniques and styles to provoke rich imagery intertwined with her self expression and themes.

== Exhibitions + Awards ==
=== Solo ===
- 1981, Nancy Edell, Art Gallery, Mount Saint Vincent University, Halifax, Nova Scotia.
- 1984, Boudoir / Home Entertainment, Great George Street Gallery, Charlottetown, PEI.
- 1985, Nancy Edell, Southern Alberta Art Gallery, Lethbridge, Alberta.
- 1986, Home Entertainment, Plug In Gallery, Winnipeg, Manitoba.
- 1988, Nancy Edell, Omaha Art Gallery, Omaha, Nebraska.
- 1989, Fragile Structures, Anna Leonowens Gallery, Halifax, Nova Scotia.
- 1989, Nancy Edell, Galerie d’Art, Université de Moncton, Moncton, New Brunswick.

=== Group ===
Edell had her work in many group exhibitions, national and international.

=== Selected public collections ===
Her work is included in the following public collections, among others:

- Art Gallery of Greater Victoria, Victoria, British Columbia
- Art Gallery of Nova Scotia, Halifax, Nova Scotia
- Robert McLaughlin Gallery, Oshawa, Ontario
- Winnipeg Art Gallery, Winnipeg, Manitoba
