= McKeel =

McKeel is a surname. Notable people with the surname include:

- Seth McKeel (born 1975), American politician
- Walt McKeel (1972–2019), American baseball player

== See also ==
- McKeel Academy of Technology, a high school in Florida, United States
- McKeen (surname)
