= Gown (disambiguation) =

A gown is a loose outer garment by men and women from the early Middle Ages to the seventeenth century, or any woman's garment consisting of a bodice and attached skirt.

Gown may also refer to:

== Clothing ==
- Evening gown, women's formal attire
- Dressing gown, British term for a bathrobe
- Mandarin gown, Cheongsam
- Suicide gown, anti-suicide smock
- Cap and gown, graduation attire
- Wedding dress, bridal attire
- Patient gown, clothing worn by patients in hospitals
- Medical gown, clothing worn by medical professionals
- Gowning, putting on a cleanroom suit

== Other uses ==
- The Gown, a Belfast-based student newspaper

== See also ==
- McGown (disambiguation)
