= USS McKean (DD-90) =

Wickes-class destroyer

Coordinates: 6°31′S 154°52′E

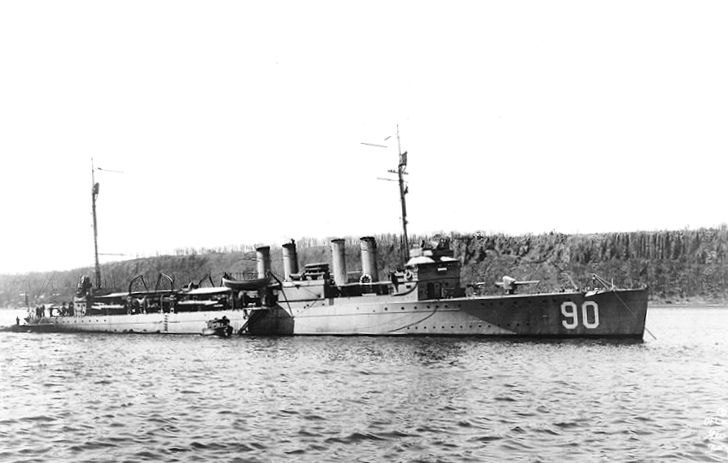
- USS McKean circa 1919.

History

United States
- Name: McKean
- Namesake: William Wister McKean
- Builder: Union Iron Works, San Francisco, California
- Laid down: 12 February 1918
- Launched: 4 July 1918
- Commissioned: 25 February 1919
- Decommissioned: 19 June 1922
- Identification: DD-90
- Recommissioned: 11 December 1940
- Reclassified: 2 August 1940, as APD-5
- Fate: Sunk, 17 November 1943

General characteristics
- Class & type: Wickes-class destroyer
- Displacement: 1,060 tons
- Length: 315 ft 5 in (96.1 m)
- Beam: 31 ft 8 in (9.7 m)
- Draft: 8 ft 6 in (2.6 m)
- Speed: 35 knots (65 km/h)
- Complement: 100 officers and enlisted
- Armament: 4 × 4"/50 (102 mm) guns; 2 × 1-pounder guns; 4 × triple 21 in (533 mm) torpedo tubes

USS McKean (DD-90/APD-5) was a Wickes-class destroyer in the United States Navy during World War II. She was the first ship named in honor of William Wister McKean.

McKean was laid down by Union Iron Works, San Francisco, California on 12 February 1918. The ship was launched on 4 July 1918, sponsored by Miss Helen La Monte Ely. The ship was commissioned at San Francisco on 25 February 1919.

== Service history ==
McKean served in the Atlantic from 1919 to 1922, made a cruise to European waters between May and July 1919, operated primarily out of New York and Charleston. The ship was decommissioned at Philadelphia on 19 June 1922. Reclassified as a high speed transport, APD-5 on 2 August 1940, she recommissioned at Norfolk on 11 December 1940 and resumed duty with the fleet.

=== World War II ===
Following the outbreak of war in the Pacific on 7 December 1941, McKean departed the east coast on 10 May 1942 and reached the South Pacific on 20 July to prepare for the invasion of the Solomons. She landed troops at Tulagi on 7 August and during the next several months made escort and supply runs from bases in New Caledonia and the New Hebrides to American positions in the southern Solomons in support of the Guadalcanal campaign. She departed the South Pacific on 31 January 1943, and after completing a cruise to the west coast for overhaul, she resumed escort and patrol operations between the New Hebrides and the Solomons on 21 June. Between July and November, she took part in amphibious operations in the central Solomons, landing troops at beachheads on New Georgia and Rendova. In addition she patrolled the waters off Guadalcanal and up the Slot to New Georgia.

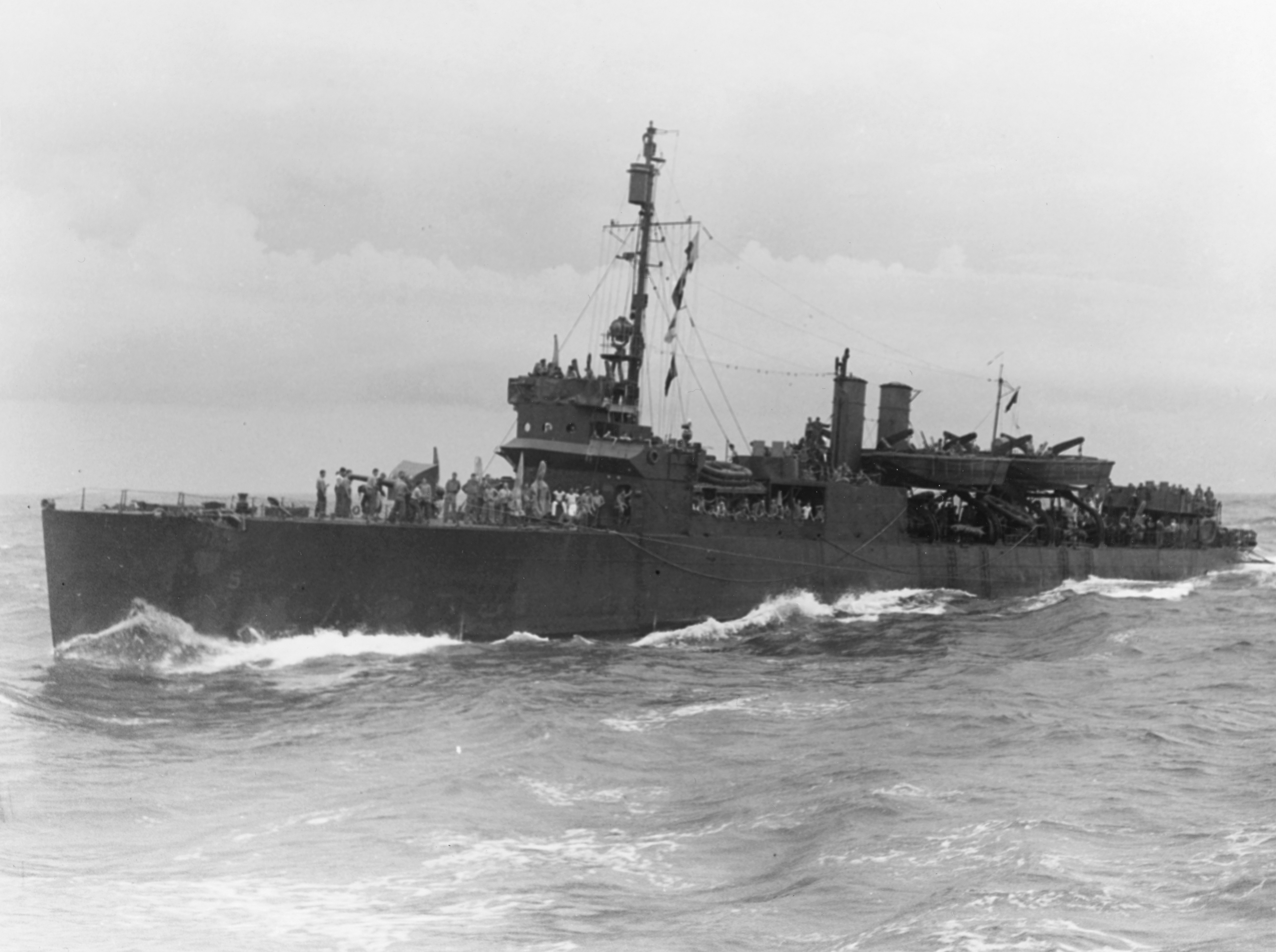
McKean off Guadalcanal on 7 August 1942

In October, she completed preparations for operations in the Treasury Islands and Bougainville. She landed fighting men on Mono Island 27 October, including a construction team which installed a vital search radar in less than a week's time. Following the American naval victory over Japanese forces in the Battle of Empress Augusta Bay during the darkness of 2 November, McKean steamed with a reinforcement convoy to Bougainville and on the 6th landed Marines near Cape Torokina, Empress Augusta Bay. She carried additional troops to Bougainville 11 November, thence returned to Guadalcanal for yet another troop run.

With 185 marines embarked, McKean sailed up the slot on 15 November. As she approached Empress Augusta Bay on the 17th, she was attacked by a Mitsubishi G4M "Betty" torpedo plane of the Imperial Japanese Navy Air Service's 702 Kōkūtai, which launched a torpedo off the starboard quarter. McKean turned to avoid the weapon; but at 0350 the torpedo struck the starboard side, exploding the after magazine and depth charge spaces and rupturing fuel oil tanks. Flaming oil engulfed McKean aft of the No. 1 stack, and she lost all power and communications. Burning oil on the water killed men who were blown or jumped overboard. Her commanding officer, Lieutenant Commander Ralph L. Ramey, ordered her abandoned at 0355; at 0400 she began to sink by the stern. He went over the side 12 minutes later; her forward magazine and oil tank exploded at 0415; and her stacks disappeared at 0418. 64 of her complement and 52 of her embarked troops died from the explosions or flames. The survivors were picked up by rescuing destroyers, the USS Sigourney (DD-643) and USS Talbot (APD-7) which were alongside for approximately two hours trying to rescue survivors.

== Awards ==
McKean received four battle stars for World War II service. McKean received the Navy Unit Commendation award. Four US Coast Guard sailors, assigned to serve as coxswains of four landing craft working from the McKean earned Silver Stars during the amphibious assault on Tulagi.
