= Malky =

Malky may refer to:

- Malky (Dune), a character in the novel God Emperor of Dune
- Malky, a diminutive of Malcolm (given name)
  - Malky Mackay (born 1972), Scottish footballer and manager
  - Malky Mackay (footballer, born 1942), Scottish footballer
  - Malky McCormick (1943–2019), Scottish cartoonist
  - Malky MacDonald (1913–1999), Scottish footballer and manager
  - Malky Thomson (born 1968), Scottish footballer and coach
