= USS McKean (DD-784) =

Gearing-class destroyer

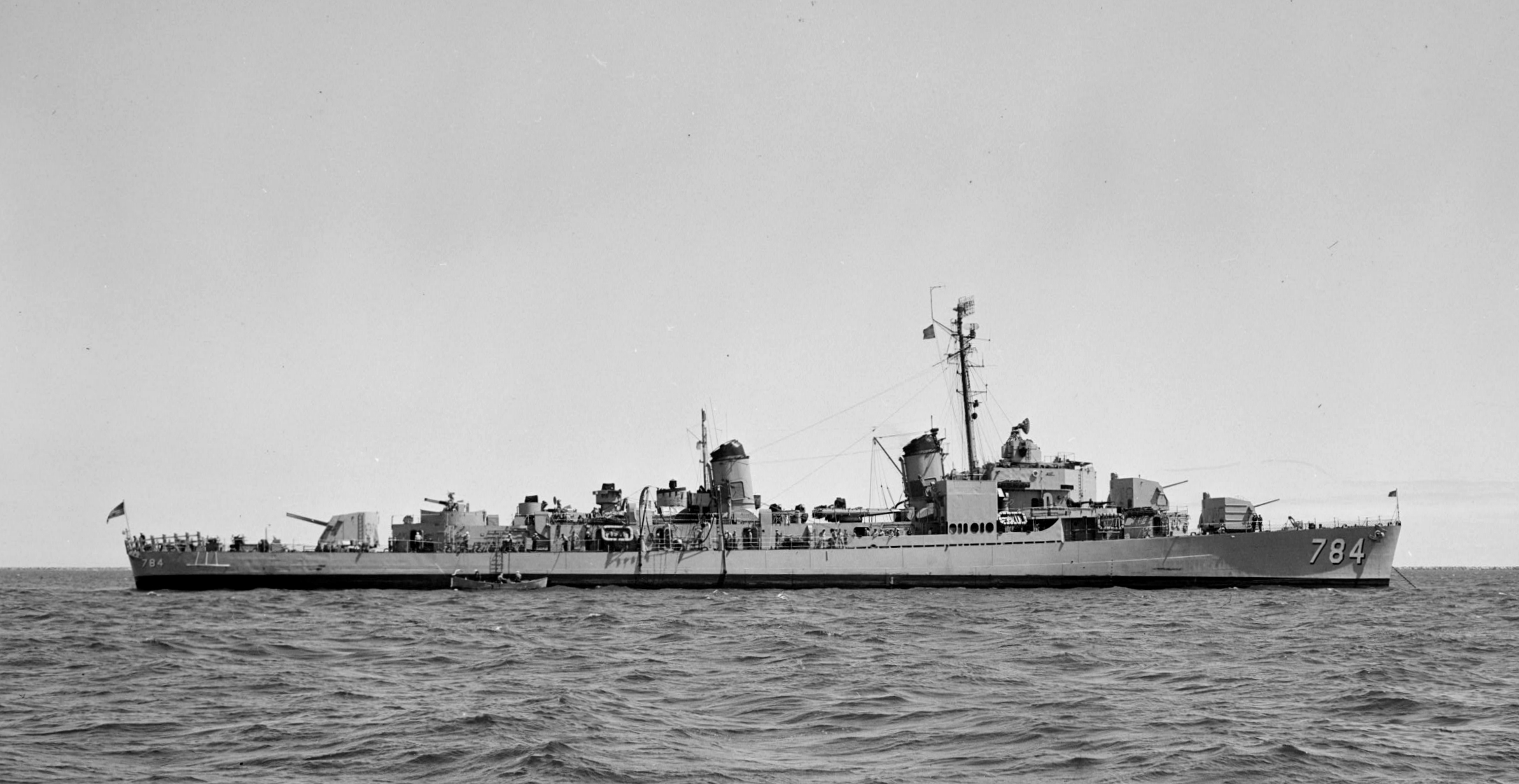
- USS McKean (DD-784) in 1952

History

United States
- Name: USS McKean
- Namesake: William McKean
- Builder: Todd Pacific Ship Building Company, Seattle, WA
- Laid down: 15 September 1944
- Launched: 31 March 1945
- Commissioned: 9 June 1945
- Modernized: 1964-1965 (FRAM IB)
- Decommissioned: 1 October 1981
- Identification: Callsign: NTMF; Hull number: DD-784
- Nickname(s): "Mighty Mac"
- Honors and awards: 1 battle star (Korea)
- Fate: Transferred to Turkey 2 November 1982

Turkey
- Acquired: 2 November 1982
- Fate: Cannibalized for spare parts & sunk July 1987

General characteristics
- Class & type: Gearing-class destroyer
- Displacement: 2,425 long tons (2,464 t)
- Length: 390 ft 6 in (119.02 m)
- Beam: 40 ft 11 in (12.47 m)
- Draft: 18 ft 6 in (5.64 m)
- Speed: 35 knots (65 km/h; 40 mph)
- Complement: 336
- Armament: 6 × 5"/38 caliber guns; 16 × 40 mm AA guns; 10 × 20 mm AA guns; 5 × 21 inch (533 mm) torpedo tubes; 6 × depth charge projectors; 2 × depth charge tracks

USS McKean (DD-784) was a Gearing-class destroyer of the United States Navy built by the Todd Pacific Ship Building Company in Seattle, Washington state.

== Ship history ==
=== 1940s ===
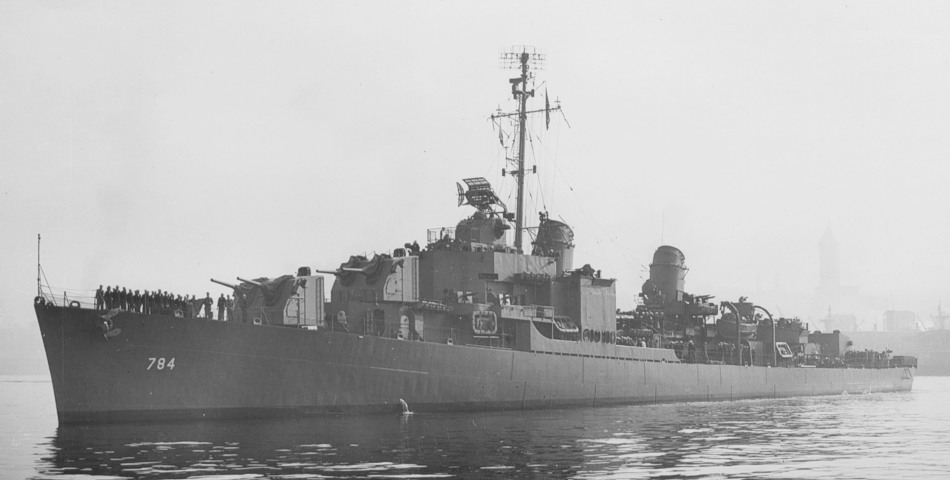
McKean, in 1945.

The USS McKean was launched on 31 March 1945 and commissioned on 9 June 1945, named after Commodore William Wister McKean, a squadron commander on the Union side during the American Civil War. DD-784 is the second ship in the United States Navy to be so named for Commodore McKean. In total, the McKean was one of the 98 Gearing class destroyers built.

Her first duty assignment was in the autumn of 1945 in a three-month tour as part of the overall occupation forces following the surrender of Japan. This included clearing Allied floating mines from Japanese waters.

=== 1950s ===
Following the outbreak of war in Korea in June 1950, McKean sailed from Long Beach, California, joining the 7th Fleet in August. She was assigned to Task Force 77, initially as part of DesDiv 112. She participated in the Inchon invasion which spearheaded the ground offensive operations against the North Korean Communists. Later, while steaming independently off the Chinnampo River, she discovered the first naval minefield reported during the Korean War. McKean dropped five depth charges on a suspected submarine on 23 September 1950. Commander John Weatherwax, a former World War II submarine officer, took command of McKean in November 1950. From October to December 1950, she joined patrolling destroyers with Task Force 72 in the Taiwan Strait with the light cruiser USS Manchester, and the destroyers USS Frank Knox, USS Hollister, and USS Ozbourn. They had to battle Typhoon Clara which broke apart into two typhoons.

On the night of 25 November 1950, hundreds of thousands of Chinese troops had crossed the Yalu River into North Korea to attack advancing U.N. forces. Chinese troops cut off and surrounded the 5th and 7th Marine Regiments with a around the Chosin Reservoir on 27 November. The relief of UN troops depended upon air cover and firepower from planes of carriers stationed off the eastern coast. McKean, Hollister and Frank Knox were released from patrolling the Formosa Straits sometime after 8 December. Under a protective canopy of naval air cover, the leathernecks broke through 10 December at Chinhung-ni and moved to Hŭngnam for evacuation. The United States Navy completed the Hŭngnam withdrawal of 24 December after embarking 105,000 troops, 91,000 refugees, and vast quantities of military cargo. Needing upkeep, McKean first ported at Yokosuka, then to Sasebo until 23 December 1950. She was to rejoin TF 77 on 24 December 1950, Christmas Eve. At that time TF 77 was the largest assembled fleet since World War II, with four carriers, the battleship Missouri, two cruisers and over 30 destroyers.

According to the book Blind Man's Bluff: The Untold Story of American Submarine Espionage by Sherry Sontag and Christopher Drew; "U.S. intelligence officials have long believed that a U.S. surface ship sank a Soviet sub that came close to an aircraft carrier attack force in 1950, early in the Korean War, according to two former intelligence officers." The United States was so concerned that the Soviet Navy would try to help the North Koreans that surface ships were under orders to protect U.S. warships by depth charging any possible hostile submarines, and in this case, a suspected Soviet submarine was attacked, with no signs that it had survived.

On 18 December 1950, McKean, codenamed "Rancher," had just left the harbor at Sasebo to rejoin Task Force 77. Task Force 77 included the battleship Missouri (BB-63), the aircraft carriers USS Philippine Sea, USS Princeton, and USS Valley Forge, the escort carriers USS Badoeng Strait and USS Sicily, the heavy cruiser USS Saint Paul, the light cruiser USS Manchester, and dozens of destroyers to screen the capital ships. "Rancher" was steaming with the USS Frank Knox. About an hour after clearing the sub nets, but with the Japanese shoreline still in sight, she received a hard contact from sonar. "Bridge, Sonar, we have a solid contact." Sonar had picked up two contacts. The Duty Quartermaster on the bridge of "Rancher" was QM3 John D. Price, as Cdr. Weatherwax had gone to his stateroom. The officer on deck ordered Price to get the Captain; Cdr. Weatherwax ran to the bridge as fast he could go, and called general quarters.

After general quarters sounded, Cdr. Weatherwax ordered depth charge runs. QM3 Price was entered into the ship's log that "Rancher" was making depth charge runs on a submarine; when Weatherwax checked the log, he ordered Price to strike the word "submarine" from the log, remarking it could lead to an international incident. The Captain had the sonar sounds piped to the bridge, so they were able to follow the approach to contact. "Rancher" immediately sent out the international Morse identification code, "dot dash" or the letter A, for "American." The code was sent with no response, and evasive action was being taken by the subs.

"Rancher" started a depth charge run, rolling charges from the rear racks and firing from the side launchers. The tracker aircraft overhead reported a silhouette in the center of the pattern at the time of the explosions, after which it disappeared and was not sighted again. The aircraft then reported sighting air bubbles near the location of the first attack and an oil slick, which grew larger as time passed. This oil slick was also sighted by the McKean and the Frank Knox, which joined about 20 minutes after the first attack. She completed her initial run, at times she lost contact but then she picked it up again and made an additional run. "Rancher" dropped 11 depth charges per pattern. "Rancher" would drop a pattern and the Frank Knox would cross her wake and drop a pattern.

Torpedo man Hudnall was on depth charge central which was on the starboard side of the ship one deck below the bridge. Torpedo man Hudnall fired the K-guns electronically and the crews on the K-guns fired manually. The pattern of depth charges were eleven to a pattern, three on each side of the ship and two stern racks. The submarine was in 250 feet of water or above because any deeper the depth charges would not go off. McKean fired 54 depth charges the day of 18 December 1950.

"Rancher" had dropped about 84 depth charges in a 24-hour period. The morning of 19 December, one of the three anti-sub airplanes overhead reported a torpedo wake passing astern of the McKean. It just missed "Rancher", and she didn't even see it. The other Russian submarine was lashing back.

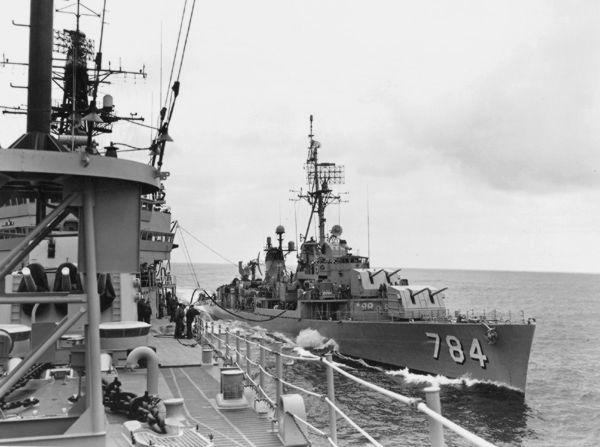
McKean as a radar-picket destroyer.

A salvage ship, the submarine rescue ship USS Greenlet, arrived from Sasebo on 20 December, to join the five destroyers and three anti-submarine airplanes at the site of the sinking. A hard hat diver was lowered to the scene, and returned to the surface with a pair of new binoculars. In addition, the Russian submarines had deployed a decoy that the sounds of a submarine in order to confuse an attacking ship. This "Black Box" was so top secret the Greenlet immediately returned to Pearl Harbor with it, and rumor has it that the Greenlet was not allowed to return to the war area because it had retrieved so many Russian secrets. Perhaps it got their code books? Rumor also has it that 43 days later all the B girls knew everything that happened, but the crew couldn't say anything because they had signed the letters of secrecy. The story the crew was told was that it was a "sunken Jap freighter the Iona Maru. Supposedly the Iona Maru capsized on 10 December 1950. The Navy brass had already formatted their cover story with the skipper of the USS Greenlet. "If those binoculars were from WWII, why wasn't there debris or barnacles, on the item". Recently a former shipmate commented, "We sunk a hulk ship that was doing five knots!."

After January 1951, McKean joined Task Force 95 for shore bombardment duty & blockade work around Wonsan, Songjin and Chinjŏn. Early in 1952, she was converted to a radar picket ship and redesignated DDR-784. Special surface scanning radar was added and in addition, the 40mm, 20mm guns, and torpedo tubes were removed and replaced with three twin mount 3in guns 3"50's.

In 1954, she appears in the closing scenes of the film The Caine Mutiny. In 1955, she took part in an underwater A-Bomb test Operation Wigwam. In early 1956, she crossed the equator for the first time to visit Singapore and again, later in 1956, to visit Melbourne during the time of the Olympic Games being held there. The task group consisting of one cruiser and four destroyers were the first U.S. ships to visit Melbourne since the end of World War II.

=== 1960s ===
In February 1964, the McKean was refitted at the Long Beach Naval Shipyard in California. This was the Fleet Rehabilitation and Modernization (commonly known as FRAM) conversion which, all told, modernized 80 of the original 98 Gearing class ships.

In July 1965, the McKean joined the Seventh Fleet in the Western Pacific. She did four months of operations beginning in August with the aircraft carrier Oriskany (CVA-34) as part of the South China Sea Attack Carrier Strike Group. Regarding this tour off the Vietnam coast, Commanding officer J. E. Mitchell wrote in a 29 December 1965 letter to the state-side families of the McKean sailors: "...If you are interested in vital statistics, here are some. Figured through our arrival at Long Beach on 13 January, McKean will have steamed a total of 57,014 miles – more than twice the distance around the world at the Equator. The total hours underway – 3,502, represents almost five of the six months deployed. Our average steaming speed was about 17 knots, or approximately 20 miles per hour, during which the ship consumed 3,748,420 gallons of fuel oil. Over 1,000 rounds of five inch projectiles were fired, weighing approximately 25 tons..."

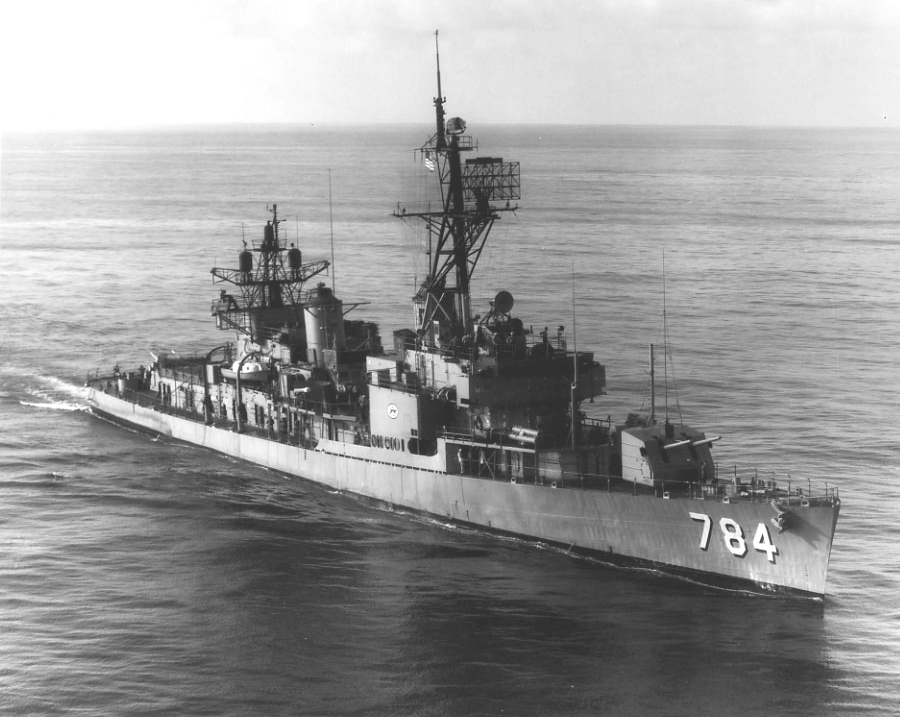
McKean following her FRAM I conversion.

After this tour, she returned to Long Beach and attended two fleet exercises, "Eager Angler" and Baseline II." For her work in these two exercises, the McKean won "Best Gunnery Ship" while competing against other destroyers and cruisers.

In November 1966, the McKean returned to the Western Pacific for Search and Rescue operations at the Gulf of Tonkin off the north coast of Vietnam. During this operation the McKean set a record with 100 inflight helicopter refuelings over a single 30-day period. Until April, 1967, on this tour of duty the McKean worked on gun line deployments, firing over 4,000 rounds during ground support work in South Vietnam.

The McKean then traveled again to Australia and then on to New Zealand as part of ceremonies commemorating the Battle of the Coral Sea. She then returned to her home port of Long Beach, arriving on 8 June 1967. In the latter half of the year the McKean was overhauled at Mare Island in California.

In March 1968, the McKean returned to Long Beach and returned to the Western Pacific via stops in Pearl Harbor, Hawaii; Yokosuka, Japan; and Sasebo, the southernmost island of mainland Japan. From Sasebo, as part of Operation Formation Star, the McKean was sent to the coast of Korea to join United States naval pressure on the North Korean government to win the release the crew of the Pueblo (AGER-2), which had been seized 23 January 1968. After this the McKean conducted patrols in the Sea of Japan, the South China Sea and Tonkin Gulf. During this time she also visited Hong Kong and Kaohsiung, Taiwan.

At the end of 1968, the McKean returned to Long Beach, only returning to the Western Pacific in 1970 after training cruises along the American West Coast. Back on tour, the ship visited Japan again, Bangkok, Guam, Hong Kong, and the Philippines. During this time she also returned to gunnery duty along Vietnam. In June 1970 she went back to Long Beach to take on more crew and to continue training and to take part in numerous U.S. Navy exercises.

=== 1970s ===
In November 1971, the McKean accompanied the British carrier Eagle to the Indian Ocean, and then joined the U.S. Seventh Fleet. In December 1971, the McKean was sent to the Bay of Bengal as part of Task Force 74 to safeguard United States interests there while the Indo-Pakistani War was waged. After rejoining the fleet, the McKean saw port calls at Singapore, Hong Kong, New Guinea and again Australia and New Zealand. She returned to Long Beach in November 1971 via stops in American Samoa and Pearl Harbor, Hawaii.

In May 1972, the McKean joined the reserve naval forces operating between California & Hawaii. In the late 1970s, her home port was in Seattle, Washington. In 1976, she appears in the background in the movie "Midway." The McKean was struck from the Navy list on 30 September 1981.

=== 1980s ===
The McKean was decommissioned in October 1981. In 1982, the ship was given to the country of Turkey to be cannibalized for spare parts. She was sunk by Harpoon missile in July 1987 and now lies at the bottom of Antalya Bay off the Mediterranean coast.
