= Malcolm Perry =

Malcolm Perry may refer to:

- Malcolm Perry (American football) (born 1997), Marine Corps officer and former wide receiver
- Malcolm Perry (physician) (1929–2009), American physician, first doctor to attend to President Kennedy at Parkland Memorial Hospital on day of his assassination
- Malcolm Perry (physicist) (born 1951), professor of theoretical physics at the University of Cambridge
