= McKean Township =

McKean Township may refer to the following townships in the United States:

- McKean Township, Licking County, Ohio
- McKean Township, Pennsylvania
