= Pearl McGown =

American hooked rug designer

Pearl Kinnear McGown (February 27, 1891 – January 28, 1983) was an American designer of hooked rugs and a teacher and innovator in the field who is credited with helping to bring the craft out of obscurity in the 20th century and gain it recognition as a form of folk art.

== Career ==
Pearl McGown learned rug-hooking as a child. Hooked rugs are made by pulling loops of yarn or thin strips of fabric through a base material with an open weave, typically burlap or linen. In North America, rug-hooking has been a widespread handicraft since the early 19th century, possibly brought over by English textile workers. Like patchwork quilts, hooked rugs have historically been primarily made by women as functional decorative objects that use up remnants from other sewing, knitting, or weaving projects. Although a few professional designers took an interest in hooked rugs during the late 19th century Arts and Crafts era, they remained associated with poverty and did not enjoy the same degree of aesthetic development as other handicrafts in that period.

In the late 1920s, McGown began designing and selling her own patterns to students of a Massachusetts hooked rug teacher, Caroline Saunders. Her business flourished and became national in scope, and she eventually hired several helpers. All told, she created over 1000 original designs during her career. She began making rugs herself (now sought by collectors) and became known for floral designs that employ many subtle shades of color to create rich detail and striking pictorial effects.

In the 1930s, McGown began writing books on the techniques of rug-hooking as well as on patterns and color schemes. She also began offering workshops in wool dying to obtain the shades needed for specific projects. Through her books and dye workshops, she championed rug-hooking's evolution from a plain craft to a folk art, insisting on high standards of fabrication and steering her students away from commercial patterns towards more personalized designs.

In 1940, McGown organized an exhibition of hooked rugs that became an annual event. During World War II, she began a newsletter, Letter Service, that offered instruction in special techniques, and she also taught rug-hooking to servicemen recuperating in military hospitals.

In 1951, McGown organized the first in what became an annual series of hooked rug workshops to train new teachers, exchange knowledge, and develop the formal study of hooked rugs and their history. The McGown Teacher Workshops, as they became known, centered on McGown's own patterns, which consequently became widely known.

In 1970, McGown sold her business to Old Sturbridge Village, and it was later sold again to the dye manufacturer W. Cushing & Co. Today, there is still a Pearl K. McGown Teacher Certification and Workshop Program under different owners.

McGown also created the first known correspondence course for those who wanted to teach rug-hooking to others.

Some of McGown's work is in the Hooked Rug Museum of North America in Nova Scotia, Canada.

== Books ==
- The Dreams Beneath Design (1938)
- The Rainbow in Rags (1943)
- You Can Hook Rugs (1951)
- Color in Hooked Rugs(1954)
- Pearsian Patterns (1958)
- The Lore and Lure of Hooked Rugs (1966)

== Personal life ==
Born Pearl Kinnear, she married Maurice McGown, with whom she had a son, Winthrop (b. 1915). Her granddaughter Jane McGown Flynn also became a noted rug-hooking designer and instructor.
