= Andy McEwan =

Scottish footballer

Personal information
- Full name: Andrew P. McEwan
- Place of birth: Scotland
- Position: Forward

Senior career*
Years	Team	Apps	(Gls)
1954–1958	Queen's Park	68	(21)
1958–1959	Rangers	1	(0)
1959–1960	Queen of the South	10	(2)
1960	Stirling Albion	0	(0)

International career
1956–1958	Scotland Amateurs	4	(0)
- * Club domestic league appearances and goals

Andrew P. McEwan was a Scottish amateur football forward who played in the Scottish League for Queen's Park, Queen of the South and Rangers. He was capped by Scotland at amateur level.
