= MacEwen (surname) =

MacEwen, MacEwan, McEwen, McEwan, McEwing
Origin
- Origin: Old Gaelic
- Meaning: "son of Eógan"
- Region of origin: Scotland

Other names
- Variant forms: McCowan, McCune

The Scottish surname MacEwen derives from the Old Gaelic Mac Eoghainn, meaning 'the son of Eoghann'. The name is found today in both Scotland and Northern Ireland. Because it was widely used before its spelling was standardized, the modern name has several common variations.

The earliest attested use is by a Malcolm MacEwen, who witnessed a charter in 1174. The surname occurs in a number of prominent families throughout Scottish history. Although author R. S. T. MacEwen claimed that all these families, with variant spellings of the surname indicating possible differing origins, probably originated in Clan Ewen of Otter, the history is more complex.

The name has varied heraldic traditions, reflecting the various origins. The first MacEwen armiger was granted arms in 1743, and his achievement reflects his family's origins in Clan MacDougall. However a second grant of arms in the name made in 1793 to William MacEwan of Glenboig, displays Cameron symbolism in both its crest and its central charge.

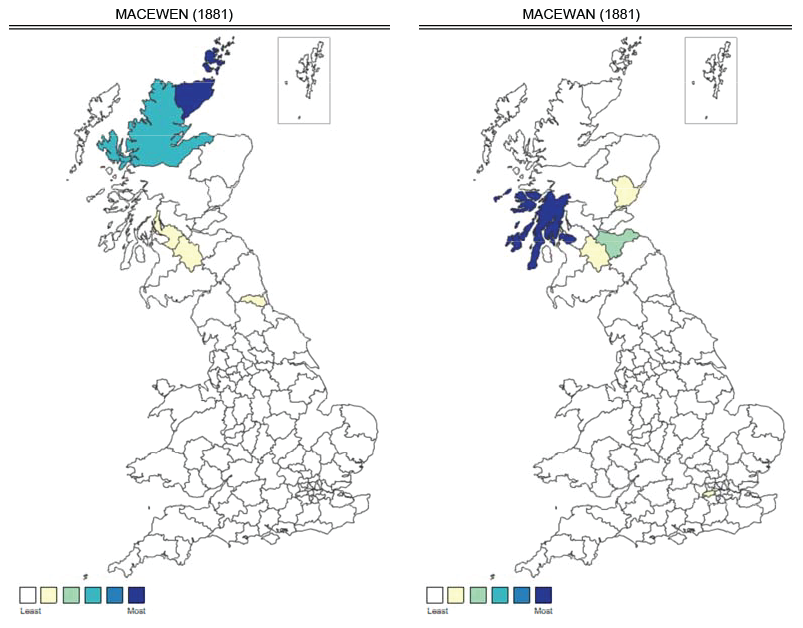
Distribution of the surnames MacEwen and MacEwan from the 1881 UK census

If one looks at the geographic distribution of the variants MacEwan and MacEwen in the 1881 UK census, it becomes apparent that the MacEwen variant mainly occurred in the extreme northeast in Kirkwall, and at a lesser density in the adjacent Inverness shire. By contrast MacEwan occurred almost exclusively in the southwest in Paisley (around Argyll). There is no overlap of the distributions, with neither name appearing in the intervening Perth shire. Variants such as McEwan and McEwen are mainly in Perth and more southerly regions of Scotland, perhaps suggesting that these forms arose as people moved in more recent times.

There are three versions of MacEwen tartan, the first of which is listed in Vestiarium Scoticum as Farquharson.

As of 2019, there are several recognized lineages. One society of Clan MacEwen in Scotland has elected a Commander and has petitioned the Lord Lyon to have his arms and Chieftainship recognized; if successful, this would return this branch of the clan to full Clan society status after about 500 years as an armigerous clan.

== Notable people surnamed McEwan, McEwen, MacEwan, or MacEwen ==
=== Born after 1800 ===
- John A. McEwen (1824–1858), American lawyer and mayor of Nashville
- William McEwan (1827–1913), Scottish brewer and politician
- Thomas (Tom) McEwan (1846–1914), Scottish artist
- William Macewen (1848–1924), Scottish surgeon
- Alexander Robertson MacEwen (1851–1916), Scottish writer, minister, professor and Moderator of the United Free Church of Scotland
- John Blackwood McEwen (1868–1948), Scottish composer
- Alexander MacEwen (1875–1941), leader of the Scottish Party and the Scottish National Party
- Norman MacEwen (1881–1953), senior commander in the Royal Air Force during the first half of the 20th century
- John McEwan (1892–1970), American football coach of Army, Oregon and Holy Cross
- Clifford McEwen (1896–1967), Canadian air marshal

=== Born after 1900 ===
- John "Black Jack" McEwen (1900–1980), Prime Minister of Australia
- Andy McEwan, Scottish footballer
- Annie McEwen (1900–1967), wife of Australian Prime Minister John McEwen
- Grant MacEwan (1902–2000), Canadian academic, politician, and author
- Frank McEwen (1907–1994), English artist, teacher, and museum administrator
- Sydney MacEwan (1908–1991), Scottish tenor
- Billy McEwan (1914–1991), Scottish footballer
- Robert C. McEwen (1920–1997), U.S. Representative from New York (1965–1981)
- Robert MacEwen (1928–2013), Rugby Union international who represented Scotland from 1954 to 1958
- Geraldine McEwan (1932–2015), British actress
- Bruce McEwen (1938–2020), American neuroendocrinologist
- Gwendolyn MacEwen (1941–1987), Canadian poet and novelist
- Paul MacEwan (1943–2017), politician and MLA in Nova Scotia, Canada
- Ian McEwan (born 1948), English novelist
- Frank McEwan, Scottish footballer

=== Born after 1950 ===
- Alfred McEwen, professor of planetary geology at the University of Arizona
- Anne McEwen (politician) (born 1954), Australian Labor Party politician
- Ann McEwen, West Indian cricketer
- Bob McEwen or Robert D. "Bob" McEwen (born 1950), U.S. Representative from Ohio (1981–1993)
- Rob McEwen (born 1950), Canadian businessman
- Billy McEwan (1951–2022), Scottish footballer and manager
- Jamie McEwan (1952–2014), American slalom canoeist and writer
- Janet McEwan, American politician
- Kaeli McEwen (born 2000), American content creator and social media influencer
- Kirsteen McEwan (born 1975), Scottish badminton player
- Mark McEwen (born 1954), American media personality
- Mark McEwan (born 1957), Canadian celebrity chef
- Nicola McEwen, professor of territorial politics at the University of Edinburgh, Centre on Constitutional Change
- Stan McEwan (born 1957), Scottish footballer
- Rhonda McEwen (born 1970 or 1971), professor and academic administrator
- David McEwan (producer) (born 1972), Australian/British music producer and musician
- Robbie McEwen (born 1972), Australian-Belgian cyclist
- Sparky McEwen (born 1968), American football player
- Andrea McEwan (born 1978), Australian singer
- David McEwan (footballer) (born 1982), Scottish footballer
- Danielle McEwan (born 1991), American ten-pin bowler
- Zack MacEwen (born 1996), Canadian ice hockey player

== See also ==
- Clan Ewen of Otter
- Clan MacEwen
- Joe McEwing (born 1972), American baseball player
- Eógan, Ewen, Euan, Owain
- List of Scottish Gaelic surnames
- McCune (surname)
- McCunn
- McKeown
