= Richard McGown =

Scottish-Zimbabwean doctor and murderer (1936–2024)

- Born: Richard Gladwell McGown; September 15, 1936; Perth, Scotland, United Kingdom
- Died: 5 June 2024 (aged 87)
- Other name: "Dr. Death"
- Conviction: Culpable homicide
- Penalty: One year imprisonment

Details
- Victims: 2–5+
- Span of crimes: 1986–1992
- Country: Zimbabwe
- State: Harare

Richard Gladwell McGown (15 September 1936 – 5 June 2024), also known as Dr. Death, was a Scottish-Zimbabwean anaesthetist, murderer and suspected serial killer. He was found guilty of murdering two children from 1986 to 1992 by injecting large amounts of morphine into their bodies, but is suspected of murdering at least three others as well. He was found guilty of culpable homicide and sentenced to a year in prison, after which he was released and returned to the UK. McGowan died on 5 June 2024, at the age of 87.

== Early life and education ==
Richard Gladwell McGown was born on 15 September 1936 in India, but was brought up in Glasgow, later studying at the University of Edinburgh, from which he graduated in 1959. He worked in Sweden and Zambia before moving to Rhodesia (modern day Zimbabwe) in the late 1960s, where he gained a reputation as a consultant anaesthetist.

== Experiments ==
McGown eventually developed a deep interest in post operative pain relief, and decided to begin experimenting with new drugs and anaesthetics in 1981 on his predominantly underage black patients. From 1986 to 1992, he performed his method on 500 patients without their knowledge. Among his victims were 10-year-old Kenyan-born girl Lavender Khaminwa (who died following a supposed appendectomy) and two and a half years old Kalpesh Nagindas, a Zimbabwean boy of Indian origin. Nagindas had been admitted to the Avenues Clinic in Harare on 13 July 1988 for a circumcision because he had problems urinating. Instead, the toddler's spine was injected with morphine to supposedly relieve the pain after the operation. Following the surgery, McGown handed the child over to his father, Mansakh Nagindas, with the following words: "Here is your child. I've brought him back from the dead." The boy was irritable and later fell into a deep sleep, before he began to vomit yellow liquid. Nagindas was taken back to the hospital, where he died six hours after his operation. McGown is also suspected of murdering 4-year-old Tsitsi Chidodo, a Zimbabwean girl, Irene Papatheocharous, a mother of Greek descent, and 62-year-old Nigerian woman Rose Apinke Osazuwa.

Nurses who worked alongside McGown expressed their concerns about the high number of deaths, but initially, nobody took them seriously. However, in 1993 a parliamentary report alleged that the doctor had carried out clinical trials without following the necessary procedures. The nurses were the first to inform the press on the matter, but nothing could be done at that point, since most of the cases were considered sudden deaths.

== Arrest, trial and sentence ==
After some time, McGown was investigated on allegations of negligence, gross incompetence, and disgraceful conduct. He was eventually arrested, and brought to court. When the news broke, a group of students led by Obey Mudzingwa, began protesting, even threatening to attack white people if the doctor wasn't sentenced.

In the courtroom, he argued that he injected the children with morphine because if it worked on adults, it would also work on children. Zimbabwe's Attorney General Patrick Chinamasa, head of the prosecution team, described the anaesthetist as a "messenger of death stalking our hospitals." During trial, he was observed playing with a metal chain, eating sweets and humming to himself, for which he was reprimanded by Judge Paddington Garwe. The doctor was charged with five deaths, but only convicted of the murders of Nagindas and Khaminwa. Charles Khaminwa, lawyer and father of the murdered girl, criticised the prosecutors for failing to explain why they dropped the charges against McGown carrying out experiments on black people. His opinion was backed by the majority of Zimbabweans, who described McGown as a Nazi and a racist.

Despite pleading not guilty, McGown was sentenced to a year in prison, six months of which included a suspended sentence, and to pay 1,250 dollars to the families. Mansakh Nagindas, father of the murdered Kalpesh, said that the sentence was a "mockery of justice".

== Aftermath ==
After serving out his sentence, McGown was released, returning to his native UK. He tried to appeal in a London court in an attempt to retain his licence, since he was still eligible to practise in the UK. He admitted to breaching his duty to ensure safe recovery, but denied any serious professional misconduct and failure to properly care in the death of Lavender Khaminwa. However, the British General Medical Court, following a similar 1995 ruling by the Health Professions Council of Zimbabwe, banned him from practising medicine anywhere in the world.

== See also ==
- List of serial killers by country
