= Rug hooking =

Craft technique for rugs and hangings

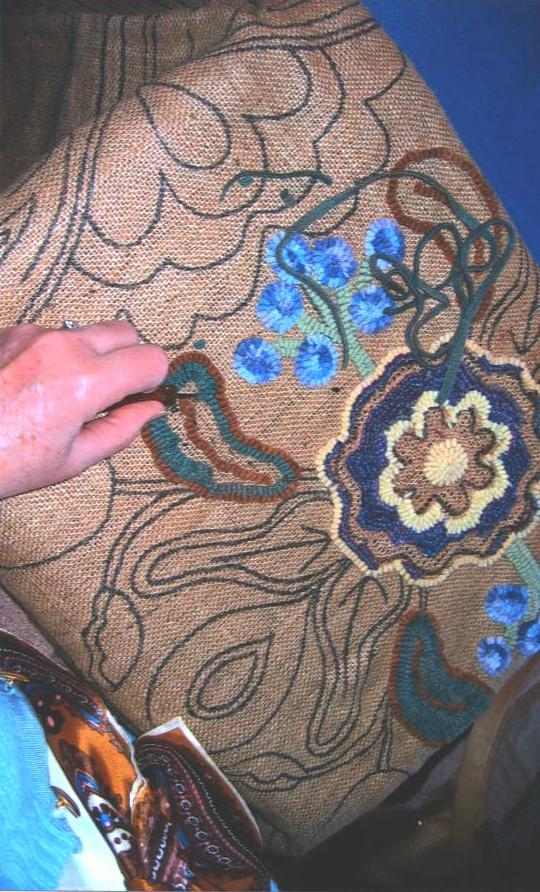
A craftsperson creates a hooked rug by pulling lengths of cloth, usually wool, through a woven fabric, usually burlap.

Rug hooking is both an art and a craft where rugs are made by pulling loops of yarn or fabric through a stiff woven base such as burlap, linen, or rug warp. The loops are pulled through the backing material by using a crochet-type hook mounted in a handle (usually wood) for leverage. In contrast latch-hooking uses a hinged hook to form a knotted pile from short, pre-cut pieces of yarn.

Wool strips ranging in size from 3/32 to 10/32 in (2 to 8 mm) in width are often used to create hooked rugs or wall hangings. These precision strips are usually cut using a mechanical cloth slitter; however, the strips can also be hand-cut or torn. When using the hand-torn technique the rugs are usually done in a primitive motif.

Designs for the rugs are often commercially produced and can be as complex as flowers or animals to as simple as geometrics. Rug-hooking has been popular in North America for at least the past 200 years.

== History of rug hooking ==
The author William Winthrop Kent believed that the earliest forebears of hooked rugs were the floor mats made in Yorkshire, England, during the early part of the 19th century. Workers in weaving mills were allowed to collect thrums, pieces of yarn that ran 9 inches (23 cm) long. These by-products were useless to the mill, and the weavers took them home and pulled the thrums through a backing. The origins of the word thrum are ancient, as Mr. Kent pointed out a reference in Shakespeare's Merry Wives of Windsor. However, in the publication "Rag Rug Making" by Jenni Stuart-Anderson, ISBN 978-1-900371-53-7, Stuart-Anderson states that the most recent research indicates "...the technique of hooking woolen loops through a base fabric was used by the Vikings, whose families probably brought it to Scotland." To add to this there are sound examples at the Folk Museum in Guernsey, Channel Islands, that early rag rugs made in the same manner were produced off the coast of France as well.

Rug hooking as we know it today may have developed in North America, specifically along the Eastern Seaboard in New England in the United States, the Canadian Maritimes, and Newfoundland and Labrador. In its earliest years, rug hooking was a craft of poverty. The vogue for floor coverings in the United States came about after 1830 when factories produced machine-made carpets for the rich. Poor women began looking through their scrap bags for materials to employ in creating their own home-made floor coverings. Women employed whatever materials they had available. Girls from wealthy families were sent to school to learn embroidery and quilting; fashioning floor rugs and mats was never part of the curriculum. Another sign that hooking was the pastime of the poor is the fact that popular ladies magazines in the 19th century never wrote about rug hooking. It was considered a country craft in the days when the word country, used in this context, was derogatory. Today, rug hooking has been labeled in Canada as a fine art and has gained wider respect across the world.

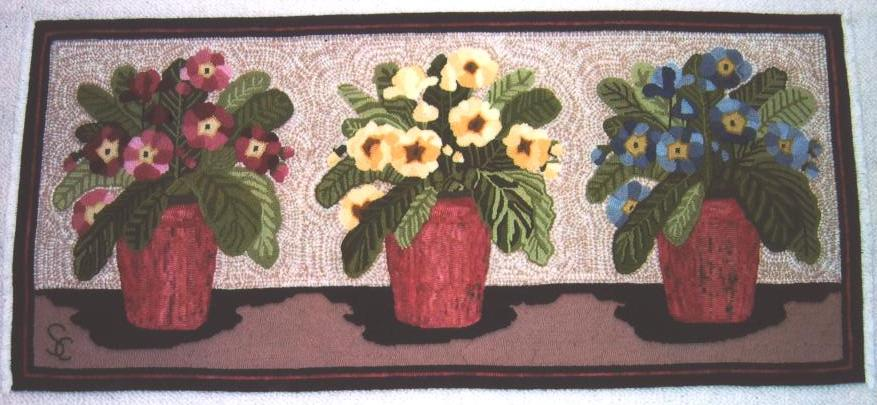
A modern hooked rug from Lebanon, New Hampshire. Rug hooking was originally developed in England as a method of using leftover scraps of cloth.

Since hooking was a craft of poverty, rug makers put to use whatever materials were available. Antique hooked rugs were created on burlap after 1850 because burlap was readily available as grain and feed bags. Fiber and fabric that was no longer suitable for clothing was often incorporated into rugs. In the United States, yarn was not a fiber of choice if one did not have access to thrums. Yarn was too precious, and had to be saved for knitting and weaving. Instead the tradition of using scraps of fabric evolved. However, New England was the site of the development of preprinted designs on burlap, indicating a shift in the status of rug hooking, at least for some. While preprinted embroidery patterns had long existed, it was Philena Moxley of Lowell, Massachusetts who first developed a business stamping embroidery and rug hooking designs about 1868-1871. At about the same time, Edward Sands Frost of Maine developed a successful rug kit making business catering to women in Northern New England. The industrial revolution was providing people with more free time to read about hooking and other past-times in magazines and catalogs, and to enjoy engaging in them. Hand-hooked rugs were now being seen as providing some elegance in the home.

Yarns, fabrics, and other materials have been used for hooked rugs in the Canadian Maritimes. The Cheticamp hooked rugs used finely spun yarns, while the Grenfell mats were created with recycled jerseys. Everything from cotton T-shirts to silk and nylon stockings were cut and used.

The Grenfell Mission had set standards for hooking with silk stockings as early as 1916. Pearl McGown, working at first under the tutelage of Caroline Saunders in the 1930s, has been credited with saving the craft from disappearing in the United States. McGown popularized guidelines for fine shading with wool using various dye methods, and formalized the study of rug hooking. In 1950, after an especially informative week of rug hooking with 15 other rug hooking teachers, McGown was approached to organize teachers' workshop to further the study of the art, exchange ideas, and pass on techniques. In 1951, hooked rug teachers came together for the first of what became an annual McGown Teacher Workshop. These workshops exclusively used McGown's own patterns, in recognition of the work and time McGown spent each year on maintaining the program. This tradition lives on through the Pearl K. McGown Teacher Certification and Workshop Program, now sponsored by Honey Bee Hive Rug Hooking Patterns & Supplies. Many well-known hooked rug designers and teachers have passed through the McGown certification program, including Joan Moshimer, Jane Olson, Gene Shephard, Eric Sandberg, Jane Nevins, Gail Dufresne, and Michelle Miccarelli.

=== Rug-hooking tools ===
In the 1930s the handicraft of rug hooking spread to Denmark, where it flourished. In 1939, Ernst Thomsen of Hjørring invented a handheld tool which sped up the hooking process making it possible to create large carpets in a reasonable length of time. Due to this faster process, rug hookers were less likely to run into physical problems with their arms, hands and shoulders. The tool was initially marketed in 1949 under the name Aladdin Carpet Needle. A decade later, the name was changed to the Danella Rug Hooking Tool.

== Rug hooking today ==
In more recent decades hookers have followed quilters in exploring new materials and new techniques. This experimentation, combined with knowledge and respect for the past, will allow rug hooking to evolve and grow in the 21st century. Rug hooking today has evolved into two genres, which primarily fall into groups based upon the width of the wool strip employed to create a rug: fine hooking and primitive hooking.

Fine hooking, in general, uses strips of wool measuring 1/32 to 5/32 of an inch wide. Designs of the fine-cut hooking genre use more fine shading accomplished by overdyeing wool in graduated color swatches. Primitive (or wide-cut) hooking uses wool strips measuring 6/32 up to 1/2-inch wide. The wide-cut hooking accomplishes shading and highlights using textures in wool, such as plaids, checks, herringbones, etc. Wide-cut designs are generally less detailed and mimic the naivety of rug hookers of the past. There are many well-known designers of commercial rug patterns and each exhibit their own distinct style and techniques. Some designers specialize in animals or whimsical subjects, others use specific and identifiable dyeing techniques, while others adapt antique rugs for today's rug hookers or employ various tools to achieve their chosen subject matter within their designs. In addition to the many commercially available patterns, many rug hookers are creating their own design patterns. Today's great Modern Folk Rug Hookers include; Norma Batastini, NJ; Cheryl Bollenbach, CO; Maggie Bonanomi, MO; Barbara Carroll, PA; Gail Dufresne, NJ;Carla Fortney, CA; Sally Van Nuys OH; Jayne Hester, NY; Cynthia Norwood, TX; Deanne Fitzpatrick, NS; Cindi Gay, Pemberville, OH; etc. There are many people like Magdalena Briner who made creative and original rugs.

ATHA, The Association of Traditional Hooking Artists, was formed by a group of women who felt the rules of the McGown Workshops (I.e. only original designs, McGown Patterns, CHARCO & PRIMCO DESIGNS are allowed at the workshop rug show), too restrictive and chose to form an alternative. In recent years, ATHA's leadership reflects the importance of bringing together the most interested and dedicated people to encourage and support advanced creative efforts. Attempts to create an ATHA teacher training program were met with tepid enthusiasm. The McGown Program allows for instructors to form a solid basis to move on to creating at the level that is seen consistently in the pages of the newly revamped ATHA Newsletter.

There are countless annual exhibitions around the world displaying rug hooking. A forthcoming one is "Hooked Between Two Islands" The History of the Hooked Rug Between Newfoundland and Guernsey. The exhibition is scheduled for 2011 at the Guernsey Folk and Costume Museum, Guernsey, Channel Islands sponsored by The National Trust of Guernsey and the Canadian Portrait Academy. A permanent collection of hooked rugs by Patty Yoder is currently installed at the Shelburne Museum in Vermont.

There is a rug show held annually at Sauder Village in Archbold, Ohio that displays hundreds of rugs for one week in August each year. In 2016 there are 825 rugs on display, including a special exhibition to honor Pearl McGown. The 2023 Rug Hooking week at the Sauder Village is expecting to have around 700 fiber art pieces.

In the 1980s, Canadian artist Nancy Edell, discovered rug-hooking after moving to Nova Scotia, located on Canada's east coast. She introduced traditional rug-hooking into her surrealist, feminist art practice, using the medium to explore ideas of feminist utopia, and the gendering of space. She became one of many female artists (see Miriam Shapiro, Joyce Wieland) at the time to use what had been considered "feminine arts" to explore and deconstruct the male dominated hierarchy of fine art.

== Latch hooking ==
A latch hook is both the tool and the textile art of latch hooking. Latch hooking differs from traditional rug hooking and locker hooking by the physical knotting of the yarn to canvas. Latch hooking was invented in the nineteenth century with the latch needle; in the twentieth century the latch needle underwent numerous variations, including the hand tool used by artisans and crafters to produce latch hook rugs. While rug hooking uses a base fabric of burlap or hessian, latch hooking uses specially woven rug canvas. Rug canvases range from 3.3 holes per inch (hpi) to 5 hpi. The pattern may be stencilled onto the canvas or worked from a chart similar to a needlepoint pattern. Latch hook yarns may be bought pre-cut (usually 2.5 inch lengths) or in skeins and cut to the desired length.

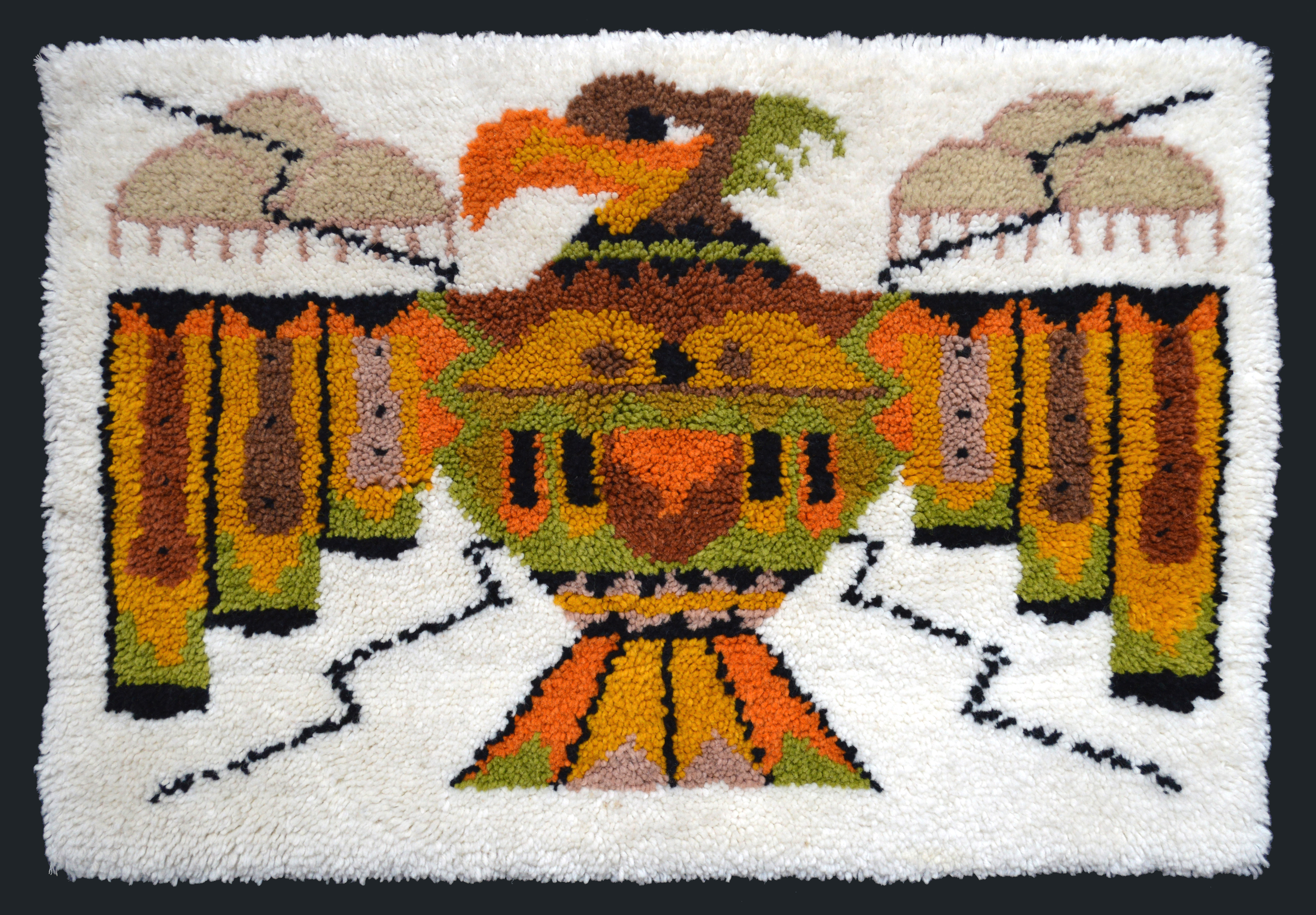
Late 20th century Thunderbird latch hooked rug. Collection of Bill Volckening, Portland, Oregon.

In his book The Hooked Rug, published in 1930, American writer William Winthrop Kent describes a form of rugmaking

A canvas is used like cross-stitch canvas only coarser, which has every third mesh a large one. It is held on the knee or on a table. The pieces of wool yarn are cut exactly the same length by a gauge. The hook used has a catch or latch on it and is inserted in one hole and out the next in the next row, as follows: The wool is held in the left hand and above the canvas, then doubled and the double end is slipped over the hook, the catch being up or open. The hook is then drawn out through the canvas toward the worker, the cut ends being kept in the left hand. The catch by this action drops down and secures the wool. The tool is next pushed forward through the wool loop and catches the two ends held in the left hand, then the loop is held in the left hand and has the two ends pulled through it with the hook. To pull out hook and draw tight the two cut ends finishes the knot. This is really a pile fabric and is known as a Turkey Rug but sprang from the hooking process as the earlier hook used was of the crochet hook form.

During the 1930s, latch-hooked wool rugs became popular and written guidelines helped standardise the craft. The heyday of latch-hooking with yarn in Britain was just after the Second World War and dominated by several companies based near the textile mills in the north of England. Latch hooking was one of the activities available to convalescing soldiers, hospital patients and care home residents. Women's Institutes got discounts on bulk-buys and made rugs for sale. In the 1970s and 1980s, synthetic yarns and wool/synthetic blends became popular, but rug-making was entering a decline due to the availability of cheap imported rugs and to decreasing leisure time. In Britain, the best-known latch-hook company was Readicut (their rug kits were marketed through Shillcraft in North America). Patons and Baldwin invented the rotary "Patwin" wool cutter, but Readicut went a stage further and sold their yarn in pre-cut bundles.

=== Latch hook tool ===
The latch hook tool traces its origin to the invention of the latch needle. Invented in 1847, the latch needle was part of a knitting machine that wrapped yarn around the latch and pushed through a canvas before pulling it through and knotting the yarn to the canvas. In the 1920s, the tool was created by combining the hand hook with the latch. Latch hooks are available in different sizes. There is a regular sized latch hook that is suitable for use with interlock rug canvas and a finer latch hook which can be used for Sudan canvas. Modern crafters also use rug gauge tools to cut yarn and fabric strips to equal lengths.

==== Other uses ====
The latch hook can be used a replacement for the yarn needle in crochet, but this is niche usage. The latch hook tool can also be used in the care and maintenance of dreadlocks, with the tool being used to tighten the hair after showering or swimming.

== Sources ==
- Kent, William Winthrop (1971). The Hooked Rug. Tower Books.
- Laverty, Paula (2005). Silk Stocking Mats: Hooked Mats of the Grenfell Mission. Montreal: McGill-Queen's University Press. ISBN 978-0-7735-2506-1.
- Kopp, Joel; Kopp, Kate (1995). American Hooked and Sewn Rugs: Folk Art Underfoot. University of New Mexico Press. ISBN 0-8263-1616-6.
- Turbayne, Jessie A. (1997). Hooked Rugs: History and the Continuing Tradition. Schiffer Publishing. ISBN 0-88740-370-0.
