= McKean (surname) =

McKean or MacKean is a surname of Scottish and Irish origin, and may refer to:

== Art ==
- Charles McKean, Scottish architectural historian
- Michael Jones McKean (born 1976), American artist

== Military ==
- George Burdon McKean, Canadian recipient of the Victoria Cross
- James B. McKean (1821–1879), New York politician and Union Army general
- Scott McKean (born 1968), United States Army lieutenant general
- Thomas J. McKean (1810–1870), Union general during the American Civil War
- William McKean (1800–1865), American admiral

== Music ==
- Dave McKean, illustrator, photographer, comic book artist, filmmaker and musician
- Joy McKean, Australian country music singer
- Michael McKean (born 1947), American actor, comedian, composer and musician, appeared in This Is Spinal Tap

== Politics ==
- Arthur McKean (1882–1957), American footballer and politician
- Hugh McKean (1967–2022), Colorado politician
- James B. McKean (1821–1879), New York politician and Union Army general
- James J. MacKean, Irish politician in the 1928 Seanad
- Samuel McKean (1787–1841), American merchant and politician from Burlington, Pennsylvania
- Thomas McKean (1734–1817), signer of the U.S. Declaration of Independence

== Sport ==
- Allan McKean, Australian rugby league player.
- Arthur McKean, American footballer and politician
- Bobby McKean, Scottish footballer
- Ed McKean, American baseball player
- Jim McKean (1945–2019), Canadian baseball umpire.
- Olive McKean, American swimmer
- Tom McKean (born 1963), Scottish former middle-distance runner who won the European Championships 800m gold medal at Split in 1990

== Other fields ==
- Erin McKean, American lexicographer
- Henry McKean (1930–2024), Scottish-American mathematician
- John McKean (1941–1996), Australian ornithologist
- Kip McKean, minister
- Liz MacKean (1964–2017), British television reporter
- Maeve Kennedy McKean (1979–2020), American public health official, human rights attorney, and academic
- Roland McKean, American economist

== See also ==
- McKeen (surname)
- McKeon
