= Mac Eoin =

Mac Eoin, MacEoin or McEoin is an Irish surname. Notable people with the surname include:

- Denis MacEoin (born 1949), Irish editor
- Gearóid Mac Eoin (born 1929), Irish academic
- Seán Mac Eoin (1893–1973), Irish politician
- Tomás Mac Eoin (born 1937), Irish singer
- Owen MacEoin Dubh MacAlister (?–1571), Chief of Clan MacAlister
- Athairne Mac Eoghain (1200–1600), Irish poet

== See also ==
- Mac Eoin Bissett family
