= Thomas McEwan (painter) =

British artist (1846–1914)

- Born: 17 July 1846; Busby, Scotland
- Died: 8 June 1914 (aged 67); Gourock, Scotland
- Occupation: Painter/artist

Thomas McEwan RSW (1846–1914) was a Scottish painter in oils and watercolour, of mainly domestic scenes.

== History ==
McEwan was born near Glasgow into a poor family with artistic inclinations, his father being an amateur artist and a friend of landscape painter James Docherty. He was an apprentice to a pattern designer in Glasgow, but in 1863 attended evening classes at the Glasgow School of Art under Robert Greenlees. During the 1860s he exhibited at the Royal Glasgow Institute and in 1872 embarked on a sketching holiday with James Docherty, working on Isla and Jura.

Dutch influence can be seen in his work, especially that of Dutch painter Jozef Israëls. He used members of his family as models and was particularly fond of portraying grandparents and their children sewing and engaged in similar activities in the home and in open farmsteads, often with poultry in the foreground. The influence of Wilkie can occasionally be seen. At his best he was a very good artist, and was for several years president of the Glasgow Art Club.

He lived for many years at Rosevale, Helensburgh.

He was elected member of the Royal Scottish Society of Painters in Watercolour in 1883.

== Artwork ==
Some of his work listed here:

- Portrait of a Boy – date unknown – oil on canvas – 31 × 26 cm
- Tea Time – date unknown – oil on canvas – 45.7 × 61 cm
- A Posy – date unknown – oil on canvas
- Border Tales – date unknown – oil on canvas – 61 × 45.7 cm
- Woman Seated Beside A Spinning Wheel – 1876 – oil on canvas – 61 × 51 cm
- Nurslings – date unknown – oil on canvas – 46 × 36 cm
- Domestic Scene, Highland Interior Domestic Scene, Highland Interior – date unknown – oil on canvas – 71 × 92 cm
- An Old Woman Reading A Letter – date unknown – oil on canvas – 124 × 16.5 cm
- Sewing – date unknown – oil on canvas – 45 × 60 cm
- Companions – date unknown – oil on canvas – 46 × 60.9 cm
- Interesting News – date unknown – oil on canvas – 46 × 35.5 cm
- The Letter – date unknown – oil on canvas – 17.7 × 13.9 cm
- Grace Before Meat – date unknown – oil on canvas board – 25.4 × 35.6 cm
- A Request – date unknown – oil on canvas – 30.5 × 25.5 cm
- Mending Time – date unknown – oil on canvas – 25 × 20 cm
- A Divert – date unknown – oil on canvas – 35 × 45.5
- A Highland Industry – date unknown – oil on canvas – 76 × 64 cm
- Figures and Poultry Before a Thatched Cottage – date unknown – pencil and watercolour heightened with white – 24 × 33.6 cm
- Spinning at Her Wheel – date unknown – oil on canvas – 61 × 46 cm
- Highland Industry – date unknown – oil on canvas – 63.5 × 76.2 cm
- A Wayside Chat – 1874 – oil on canvas – 44 × 59 cm
- Companions – 1880 – oil on canvas – 30.5 × 25.5 cm
- Evening Pursuits – 1884 – oil on canvas – 46.3 × 60.9 cm
- A Liberal Defeat – 1884 – oil on canvas – 45.8 × 35.6 cm
- Somebody's Coming – 1885 – oil on canvas – 40.6 × 30.3 cm
- Reading the Bible – 1890 – oil on canvas – 49.3 × 39 cm
- Hard at Work – 1890 – oil on canvas – 36.2 × 32.4 cm
- Learn Young – Learn Fair – 1890 – oil on canvas – 30.5 × 23.5 cm
- An Artless Tale – 1891 – oil on canvas – 46.5 × 34 cm
- Shepherd's Cottage – 1893 – oil on canvas – 50 × 60 cm
- The Sunbeam – 1895 – oil on canvas – 59.5 × 44.5 cm
- Interior: The Spinning Wheel – 1896 – oil on canvas – 50.8 × 61 cm
- An Interior – 1898 – oil on canvas – 61 × 74.9 cm
- A Scotch Idyll – 1899 – oil on canvas – 50.5 × 61 cm
- In Time of War – "Mony A Sweet Babe Fatherless/And Mony A Widow Mourning" – 1900 – oil on canvas – 63.5 × 76 cm
- A Favoured Guest – 1900 – oil on canvas – 45.5 × 61 cm
- Flutist – date unknown – charcoal on paper
- The Golf Match – date unknown – oil on canvas – signed – 29 × 45 cm
- Meditation – 1889 – oil on canvas – signed – 29 × 24 cm
