= McKeown =

McKeown or MacKeown is an Irish surname. it originates from two distinct, but similar Irish names: Mac Eoghain ("Son of Eoghan") and Mac Eoin ("Son of Eoin"), which are pronounced identically: /mək ˈow ən/ or "McOwen". The surnames are associated with the Mac Eoin Bissett family, a family who arrived in the Irish Glens of Antrim in the 13th century AD with John Bissett. The family settled in the region with other Anglo-Norman families, marrying into local Gaelic families, adopting the Gaelic culture, laws, language and finding themselves totally assimilated into Irish life.

It has been suggested that within Northern Ireland's borders there are McKeowns that have a totally separate historical lineage, immigrating to Ireland with Ulster-Scotch planters, settling there during the great plantations.

This claim is difficult to substantiate, due to poor church or state records during the plantation period.

However, the lack of frequency of the name "McKeown" (and its variants) within earlier Scottish census records does not appear to suggest any evidence of a separate Scottish planter family

== People ==
- Bob McKeown, Canadian reporter
- Charles McKeown, British actor and writer
- Ciaran McKeown (1943–2019), Northern Ireland peace activist
- Donal McKeown, Catholic Auxiliary Bishop of Down and Connor
- Erin McKeown, American singer
- Gary McKeown, British footballer (retired)
- Greg McKeown (author), leadership consultant and writer
- Greg McKeown (soccer), American soccer player (retired)
- James McKeown, Irish football player
- Jim McKeown (soccer), American soccer player
- Jim McKeown (racing driver), Australian racing driver
- Jimeoin McKeown, Irish-Australian comedian and actor
- John McKeown, Scottish singer
- Joseph McKeown, British photographer
- Kaylee McKeown, Australian swimmer
- Kevin McKeown (politician), Irish-American politician; former Mayor of Santa Monica, California
- Laurence McKeown, Provisional Irish Republican Army member
- Les McKeown (1955–2021), Scottish singer, former member of the Bay City Rollers
- Malcolm McKeown, Ulster loyalist paramilitary and career criminal.
- M. Margaret McKeown, judge on the United States Court of Appeals for the Ninth Circuit
- Max McKeown, British management author
- Nick McKeown, professor of electrical engineering and computer science at Stanford University
- Paul McKeown, Scottish intelligence and analytics expert
- Sean McKeown, American herpetologist
- Susan McKeown, Irish-American singer
- Taylor McKeown, Australian swimmer
- Thomas McKeown, British physician and historian
- Thomas McKeown (footballer), Scottish footballer (Celtic, Blackburn Rovers, Scotland)
- Tom D. McKeown, American politician (US Representative from Oklahoma)

== See also ==
- McCune (surname)
- McCunn
- MacEwen
