= Malcolm McKeown =

Ulster loyalist paramilitary

Malcolm McKeown was an Ulster loyalist paramilitary during The Troubles in Northern Ireland, and a career criminal.

== The Troubles ==
During The Troubles, McKeown was a member of the Loyalist Volunteer Force (LVF), an Ulster loyalist paramilitary group in Northern Ireland.

== Criminal activities ==
Police frequently accused McKeown of being a major figure in the Northern Ireland drug trade, particularly in the Lurgan-Portadown-Banbridge area.

=== Arrests ===
On 25 March 2012 McKeown, along with James Carlisle, was arrested and charged with the February 2012 murder of suspected drug dealers Hugh and Jacqueline McGeough. The charges were subsequently dropped in January 2013.

In April 2017, McKeown was arrested on several drug charges and in connection with the arson of 27 vehicles in Craigavon and its environs, including several owned by local Police Service of Northern Ireland (PSNI) officers.

=== Assassination attempt ===
McKeown was reportedly shot and wounded during an assassination attempt at his home in Craigavon's Parkmore estate in 1999. It is believed that the attack was carried out by former LVF associates, over a feud concerning the drug trade in mid-Ulster.

== Death ==
On 19 August 2019 McKeown was gunned down while sitting in his vehicle at a fuel station in the village of Waringstown, County Down.

=== Arrests ===
Two suspects, Jake O'Brien and Andrew Martin, were arrested on 26 August 2019 and charged with the killing, which prosecutors argued was part of a long-standing gang feud. Seven other suspects were subsequently identified.

== Personal life ==
McKeown was one of three siblings. His brothers, Trevor and Clifford McKeown, were also loyalist paramilitaries and have both been convicted of sectarian murders. Malcolm McKeon had three children.
