= McCunn =

McCunn is the surname of the following notable people:

- Hamish MacCunn (1868–1916), Scottish composer, conductor and teacher
- Ruthanne Lum McCunn (born 1946), American novelist
- John McCunn (1820–1872), corrupt New York judge and member of the infamous Tweed Ring
- Dickson McCunn, fictitious character in John Buchan's novels Huntingtower and The Adventures of Dickson McCunn
- Carl McCunn (1947–1981), American wildlife photographer
- Thomas McCunn, the longest serving lifeboat at Longhope with over 300 lives saved

== See also ==
- McCune (surname)
- McKeown
- MacEwen
