= McCune (surname) =

McCune is a surname. Notable people with the surname include:

- Adam McCune (novelist) (b. 1985), American novelist
- Alfred W. McCune (1849–1927), British-American railroad builder, mine owner, and Mormon
- Amy McCune, American ecologist and evolutionary biologist
- Barron Patterson McCune (1915–2008), United States federal judge
- Bruce Pettit McCune (b. 1952), American lichenologist and botanist
- Debbie McCune Davis (b. 1951), American politician
- Earl McCune (1956–2020), American inventor, Silicon Valley entrepreneur, and electrical and telecommunications engineer
- Emma McCune (1964–1993), British foreign aid worker
- Elizabeth Ann Claridge McCune (1852–1924), Mormon missionary
- George M. McCune (1908–1948), co-developer of the McCune–Reischauer romanization system of the Korean language
- Grant McCune (1943–2010), American special effects designer
- Isaac McCune (1884–1959), Canadian politician
- Keith McCune (b. 1955), American author
- Lisa McCune (b. 1971), Australian actress
- Robert McCune (b. 1979), American football player
- Rolland D. McCune (1934–2019), American theologian
- Sara Miller McCune (b. 1941) is the co-founder and Chair of SAGE Publications
- Shannon Boyd-Bailey McCune (1913–1993), geographer and brother of George M. McCune
- Timothy S. McCune (b. 1963), Plainfield, NJ, President, Linear Integrated Systems
- William McCune (1953–2011), American computer scientist

== See also ==
- McCunn
- MacEwen
- McKeown
