= William McKean =

United States Navy admiral

William Wister McKean
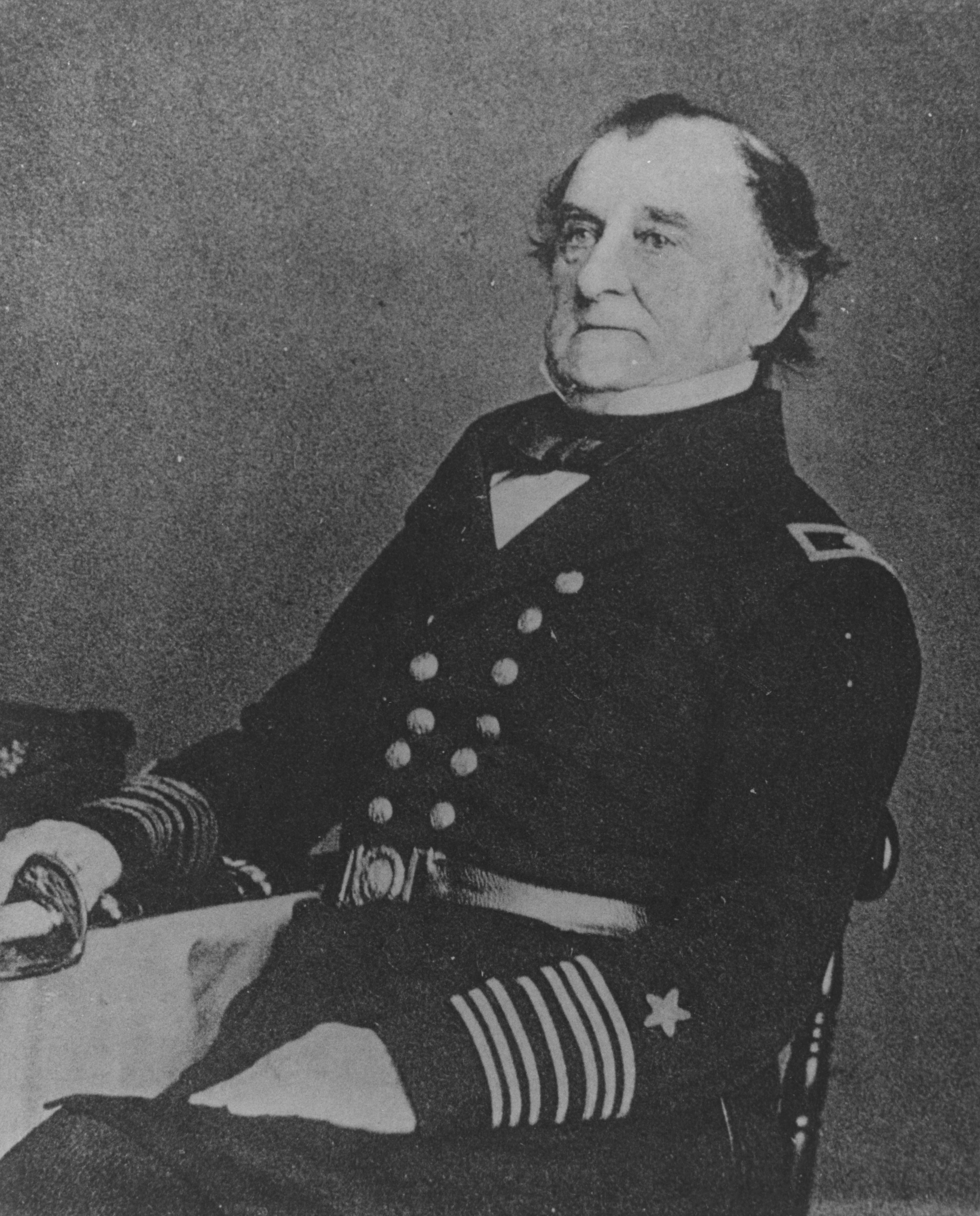
- Born: 19 September 1800; Huntingdon County, Pennsylvania, U.S.
- Died: 22 April 1865 (aged 64); Binghamton, New York, U.S.
- Burial place: Spring Forest Cemetery; Binghamton, New York, U.S.
- Relatives: Thomas McKean (grandfather); Franklin Buchanan (cousin)
- Military career
- Allegiance: United States of America
- Branch: United States Navy
- Service years: 1814–1862
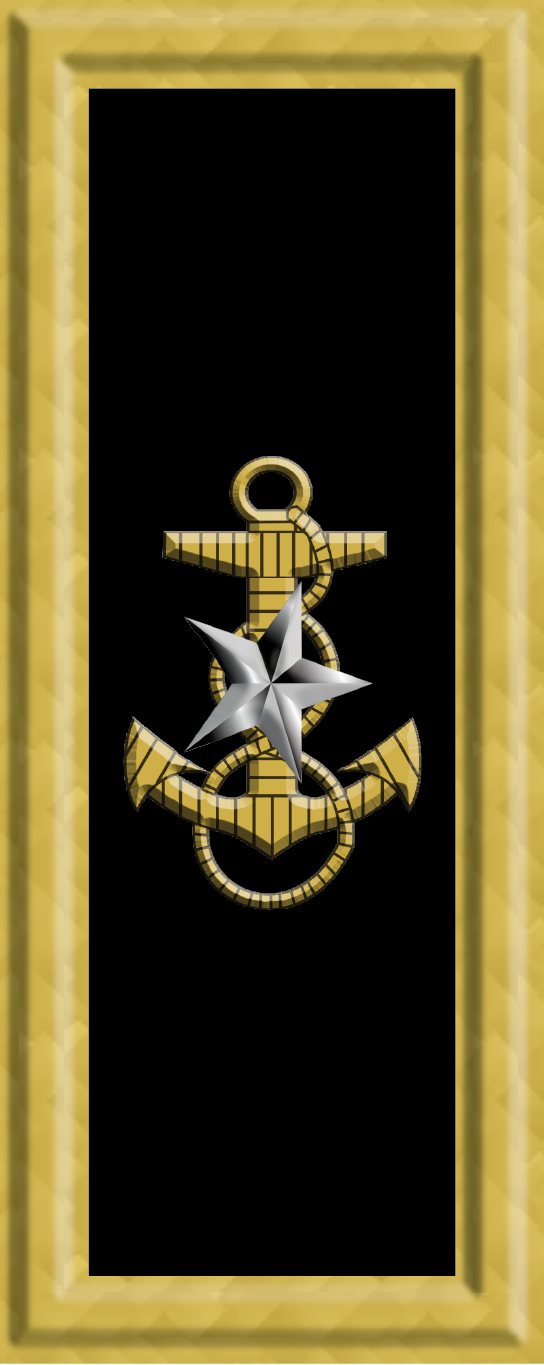
- Rank: Commodore
- Conflicts: War of 1812; American Civil War

William Wister McKean (19 September 1800 – 22 April 1865) was an admiral in the United States Navy during the American Civil War. He was noted for his service in the Union blockade that effectively closed Confederate seaports in the Gulf of Mexico.

== Early life ==
William Wister McKean was born on 19 September 1800 in Huntingdon County, Pennsylvania, to Giles McKean, a state legislator. He was the grandson of Thomas McKean, the governor of that state.

== Civil War ==
At the age of 14, McKean was appointed midshipman on the USS Java (1815) under the command of Oliver Hazard Perry on 30 November 1814. He served in the West Indies and commanded the USS Dale (1839) during Mexican–American War. He continued in the Navy into the Civil War. He was assigned to the Gulf of Mexico and became a flag officer in command of the Gulf Blockading Squadron in October 1861. In February 1862, he took command of the East Gulf Blockading Squadron and was headquartered in Key West. During the Civil War, he was in command of the USS Niagara (1855). He was promoted to commodore on 16 July 1862. He was relieved from active duty on 4 June 1862.

== Personal life ==
McKean married Davis Rosa. They had at least two children, Rosa and Stephen. His cousin was Confederate Navy officer Franklin Buchanan. Following his retirement, McKean moved to Washington Street, Binghamton, New York.

McKean died on 22 April 1865 near Binghamton. He was buried in Spring Forest Cemetery.

== Dates of rank ==
- Midshipman - 30 November 1814
- Lieutenant - 13 January 1825
- Commander - 8 September 1841
- Captain - 14 September 1855
- Retired List - 27 December 1861
- Flag Officer, Retired List - 3 January 1862
- Commodore, on Retired List - 16 July 1862
- Died - 22 April 1865

== Namesakes ==
Two ships were named USS McKean in his honor.
