= McKeen (surname) =

McKeen is a surname. Notable people with the surname include:

- Allyn McKeen (1905–1978), American football player and coach
- Angus McKeen (born 1969), Irish rugby union player
- Bob McKeen (1933–1999), American basketball player
- Charles McKeen (1885–1972), Canadian politician
- Erica McKeen, Canadian author
- H. Boyd McKeen (1835–1864), Union Army officer
- Jock McKeen (born 1946), Canadian physician
- John Elmer McKeen, American chief executive
- Joseph McKeen (1757–1807), American educator
- Nery McKeen (born 1957), Cuban middle-distance runner
- Nineveh S. McKeen (1837–1890), American soldier
- Philena McKeen (1822–1898), American educator
- Robert McKeen (1884–1974), New Zealand politician
- Stan McKeen (born 1982), Canadian rugby union player
- Stanley McKeen (1897–1966), Canadian politician
- William McKeen (born 1954), American academic
- William R. McKeen Jr. (1869–1946), American inventor and businessman

== See also ==
- McKean (surname)
- McKeon
