= Ian =

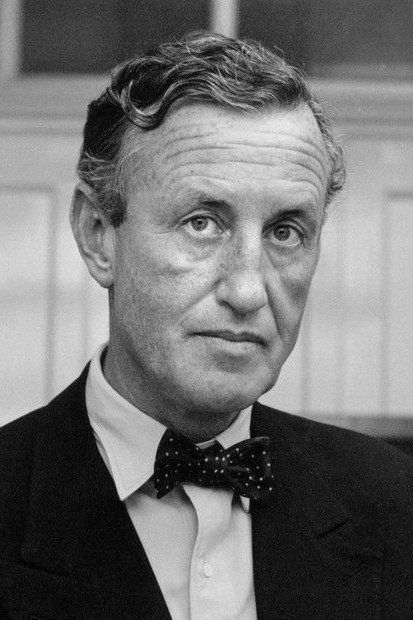
- Ian Fleming in 1958
- Pronunciation: /ˈiː.ən/ EE-ən; Scottish Gaelic: [ˈiaɲ]
- Gender: Male

Origin
- Origin: English, Scottish Gaelic, from Hebrew Yohanan

Other names
- Related names: John, Evan, Eoin, Gianni, Giovanni, Hans, Juan, Hovhannes, Ioan, Ioane, Ivan, Iven, Ifan, Jack, Jackson, Jan, Jane, Janez, Jean, Jeanne, Jhon, Joan, João, Johan/Johann, Johanan, Johannes, Jonne, Jovan, Juhani, Sean, Shane, Siôn, Yann, Yahya, Yohannes

Ian is a male name of English, Scottish Gaelic and Hebrew origin, which is derived from the Hebrew given name יוֹחָנָן (Yohanan, Yôḥānān) and corresponds to the English name John. The spelling is an Anglicization of the Scottish Gaelic forename Iain. This name is a popular name in Scotland, where it originated, as well as in other English-speaking countries.

The name has fallen out of the top 100 male baby names in the United Kingdom, having peaked in popularity as one of the top 10 names throughout the 1960s. In 1900, Ian ranked as the 180th most popular male baby name in England and Wales. As of 2019, the name has been in the top 100 in the United States every year since 1982, peaking at 65 in 2003.

Other Gaelic forms of the name "John" include "Seonaidh" ("Johnny" from Lowland Scots), "Seon" (from English), "Seathan", and "Seán" and "Eoin" (from Irish). The Welsh equivalent is Ioan, the Cornish counterpart is Yowan and the Breton equivalent is Yann.

In Korea, Ian is pronounced as 이안(I-an), and in Japan, Ian is pronounced as 偉杏, 伊庵, 一晏, etc.

== Notable people named Ian ==
=== Given name ===
- Ian (rapper) (born 2005), American rapper
- Ian Agol (born 1970), American mathematician
- Ian Alexander (disambiguation), multiple people
- Ian Anderson (born 1947), lead of the rock band Jethro Tull
- Ian Astbury (born 1962), singer of rock band The Cult
- Ian Bairnson (1953–2023), Scottish guitarist
- Ian Baker-Finch (born 1960), Australian golfer and 1991 British Open winner
- Ian Balding (1938–2026), British racehorse trainer
- Ian Bannen (1928–1999), British actor
- Ian Bazalgette (1918–1944), Canadian-British recipient of the Victoria Cross
- Ian Beausoleil-Morrison, American aerospace engineer
- Ian Bell (born 1982), English cricketer
- Ian Berry (disambiguation), multiple people
- Ian Black (disambiguation), multiple people
- Sir Ian Blair (1953–2025), British head of the Metropolitan Police Service
- Ian Bogost, American video game designer and academic
- Ian Bohen (born 1976), American actor
- Ian Bolton (born 1953), English footballer
- Ian Book (born 1998), American football player
- Sir Ian Botham (born 1955), English cricketer
- Ian Brady (Ian Duncan Stewart, 1938–2017), convicted for the Moors murders in England in the 1960s
- Ian Bremmer (born 1969), political scientist, author, entrepreneur
- Ian Broudie (born 1958), English singer in The Lightning Seeds, and music producer
- Ian Brown (born 1963), singer and lyricist in The Stone Roses
- Ian Bunting (born 1996), American football player
- Ian Calderon (born 1985), American politician
- Ian Callaghan (born 1942), English footballer
- Ian Callum (born 1954), British design director for Jaguar
- Ian Cameron (disambiguation), multiple people
- Ian Carmichael (1920–2010), English actor
- Ian S. E. Carmichael (1930–2011), American volcanologist
- Ian Carroll (born 2000), American ethical hacker and security researcher
- Ian "iDubbbz" Carter (born 1990), American YouTube personality
- Ian Chan (born 1993), Hong Kong singer-songwriter and actor
- Ian Brackenbury Channell, birth name of The Wizard of New Zealand (born 1932), educator, comedian, magician, and politician
- Ian Chappell (born 1943), Australian cricketer
- Ian Charleson (1949–1990), Scottish/British actor
- Ian Clark (disambiguation), multiple people
- Ian Clyde (born 1956), Canadian boxer
- Ian Cole (born 1989), American hockey player
- Ian Collier (1943–2008), singer and actor
- Ian Colquhoun, New Zealand cricketer
- Ian Colquhoun (author), Scottish actor and writer
- Ian Cooper (disambiguation), multiple people
- Ian James Corlett (born 1962), cartoon writer and voice actor, creator of Being Ian
- Ian Crocker (born 1982), swimmer
- Ian Curteis (1935–2021), English television writer
- Ian Curtis (1956–1980), singer and lyricist in Joy Division
- Ian Dalrymple (1903–1989), British filmmaker
- Ian Danskin, American YouTuber
- Ian Davidson (disambiguation), multiple people
- Ian Davis (disambiguation), multiple people
- Ian Desmond (born 1985), American Major League Baseball shortstop
- Ian Dickison (born 1952), New Zealand lawn and indoor bowler
- Ian D. Reid, computer scientist
- Ian Stuart Donaldson (1957–1993), English vocalist and frontman of British neo-Nazi band Skrewdriver
- Ian Dunn (activist) (1943–1998), Scottish gay and paedophile rights activist
- Ian Dunn (rugby union) (born 1960), New Zealand rugby union player
- Ian Dury (1942–2000), British singer and songwriter
- Ian Eagle (born 1969), American sports announcer
- Ian Edmond (born 1978), British swimmer
- Ian Erix, American singer-songwriter
- Ian Escobar (born 1996), Argentine footballer
- Ian Falconer (1959–2023), American author and illustrator
- Ian Ferguson (disambiguation), multiple people
- Ian Flanagan (born 1982), Welsh tennis player
- Ian Fleming (1908–1964), British novelist, creator of James Bond
- Ian Flynn (born 1982), American comic book writer
- Ian Forrest (born 1950), British racing driver
- Ian Frazier (born 1951), American writer and humorist
- Ian Froman (1937–2024), South African-born Israeli tennis player and tennis patron
- Ian George (artist) (1953–2016), Cook Islands artist
- Ian Gibbons (musician) (1952–2019), English keyboardist, member of The Kinks
- Ian Gibson (disambiguation), multiple people
- Ian Gillan (born 1945), English lead singer of hard rock band Deep Purple
- Ian Glavinovich (born 2001), Argentine footballer
- Ian Gleed (1916–1943), English Royal Air Force flying ace and one of the Few
- Ian Gold (born 1978), American football player
- Ian Gomm (born 1947), British guitarist and singer
- Ian Goodfellow (born 1987), Director of Machine Learning in the Special Projects Group at Apple computer
- Ian Gow (1937–1990), British Member of Parliament assassinated by IRA terrorists
- Ian Green (born 1946), English sprinter
- Ian Greig (born 1955), English cricketer, brother of Tony Greig
- Ian Grist (1938–2002), British politician
- Ian Gunther (born 1999), American gymnastics creator
- Ian Hall (musician) (1940–2022), Guyanese-born British musician and composer
- Ian Hallard (born 1974), British actor
- Ian Hamilton (disambiguation), multiple people
- Ian Hanlin, Canadian voice actor
- Ian Hanomansing, Canadian journalist and news anchor
- Ian Harding (born 1986), American actor
- Ian Harrison (sailor) (1937–2016), British Paralympic sailor
- Ian Hart (born 1964), English actor
- Ian Haugland (born 1964 as Jan-Håkan Haugland), Norwegian-born Swedish drummer for the band Europe
- Ian Healy (born 1964), Australian wicket-keeper
- Ian Hecox (born 1987), American comedian with Smosh
- Ian Henderson (footballer) (born 1985), English footballer
- Ian Henderson (news presenter) (born 1953), Australian news presenter
- Ian Henderson (police officer) (1927–2013), former head of secret police in Bahrain, accused of torture
- Ian Henderson (rugby league) (born 1983), Scottish rugby hooker who plays in Australia
- Ian Hennessy (born 1967), Irish soccer player
- Ian Hicks (disambiguation), multiple people
- Ian Hill (born 1951), bassist for metal band Judas Priest
- Ian Hislop (born 1960), British satirist and editor of Private Eye
- Ian Ho (born 1997), Hong Kong freestyle swimmer
- Sir Ian Holm (1931–2020), British actor
- Ian Holmes (footballer, born 1950)
- Ian Holmes (runner) (born 1965), English runner
- Ian Holmes (footballer, born 1985)
- Ian Hornak (1944–2002), painter
- Ian Hunter (actor) (1900–1975), English actor
- Ian Hunter (singer) (born 1939), English singer of Mott the Hoople
- Ian McLellan Hunter (1915–1991), English screenwriter
- Ian Huntley (1974–2026), double murderer
- Ian Jacobs (oncologist) (born 1957), English academic, gynaecological oncologist, gynaecologist/obstetrician
- Ian Jacobs, Australian kickboxer and 3-time World Kickboxing Champion
- Ian James (athlete) (born 1963), Olympic athlete
- Ian Jones-Quartey (born 1984), animator
- Ian Joyce (born 1985), American soccer player
- Ian Kahn (born 1972), American actor
- Ian Karmel (born 1984), American stand-up comedian and writer
- Ian Keith (1899–1960), American actor
- Ian Kennedy (born 1984), Major League Baseball pitcher
- Ian Kennelly (born 2001), American football player
- Ian Kershaw (born 1943), English historian
- Ian "Lemmy" Kilmister (1945–2015), singer/bass player in Motörhead
- Ian Kinsler (born 1982), Israeli-American Major League Baseball All Star second baseman
- Ian "Vaush" Kochinski (born 1994), American YouTuber and livestreamer
- Ian Koziara, American operatic tenor
- Ian Krankie (born 1947), Scottish entertainer
- Ian La Frenais (born 1937), English writer
- Ian Laperrière (born 1974), Canadian-American hockey player
- Ian Lavender (1946–2024), English actor
- Ian Law (born 1938), Australian rules footballer
- Ian Levy (born 1966), British Conservative MP for Blyth Valley since 2019
- Ian Hideo Levy (born 1950), American author
- Ian Oswald Liddell (1919–1945), recipient of the Victoria Cross
- Ian Livingstone (born 1949), author
- Ian Lorimer, British television director
- Ian Lucas (born 1960), British politician
- Ian MacArthur (1925–2007), British politician
- Ian MacDonald (1948–2003), English author
- Ian Macdonald (barrister) (1939–2019)
- Ian MacKaye (born 1962), musician
- Ian Mahinmi (born 1986), basketball player
- Ian Malcolm (politician) (1868–1944), Member of Parliament (1910–1919)
- Ian Martin (disambiguation), multiple people
- Ian Matos (1989–2021), Brazilian diver
- Ian Matthews (drummer) (born 1971), drummer for Kasabian
- Ian Maxtone-Graham (born 1959), television writer and producer
- Ian McAteer (born 1961), former gangster from Glasgow
- Ian McCaskill (1938–2016), weather forecaster
- Ian McCulloch (actor) (born 1939), actor
- Ian McCulloch (singer) (born 1959), British singer in the band Echo & the Bunnymen
- Ian McCulloch (snooker player) (born 1971), snooker player
- Ian McDiarmid (born 1944), Scottish actor
- Ian McDonald (musician) (1946–2022), British musician, best known for being a member of both King Crimson and Foreigner
- Ian McDougall (disambiguation), multiple people
- Ian McEwan (born 1948), English novelist and screenwriter
- Ian McKay (1953–1982), English recipient of the Victoria Cross
- Sir Ian McKellen (born 1939), English actor
- Ian McLagan (1945–2014), English musician, best known for being a member of both Small Faces and Faces
- Ian McMillan (footballer) (1931–2024), Scottish footballer
- Ian McMillan (poet) (born 1956)
- Ian McPhedran (born 1957), Australian journalist and author
- Ian McShane (born 1942), actor
- Ian Messiter (1920–1999), English creator of Just a Minute
- Ian Miles (1952–2025), Australian rules footballer
- Ian Monk (1960–2025), British writer and translator
- Ian Moran (cricketer) (born 1979), Australian cricketer
- Ian Moran (born 1972), American hockey player
- Ian Morris (cricketer) (born 1946), Welsh cricketer
- Ian Morris (musician) (1957–2010), New Zealand musician
- Ian Morris (historian) (born 1960), British historian
- Ian Morris (athlete) (born 1961), Trinidadian athlete
- Ian Morris (footballer) (born 1987), Irish footballer
- Ian Morrison (journalist) (1913–1950), Australian journalist
- Ian Morrison (RNZAF officer) (1914–1997), senior officer of the Royal New Zealand Air Force
- Ian "Scotty" Morrison (born 1930), former National Hockey League referee and vice president
- Ian Morrison (footballer) (born 1954), Australian rules footballer
- Sir Ian Morrow (1912–2006), British accountant and politician
- Ian Morton (born 1970), English cricketer
- Ian Mosley (born 1953), drummer for Marillion
- Ian Moss (born 1955), Australian musician, Cold Chisel
- Ian Murdock (1973–2015), computer professional, creator of the Debian project
- Ian Nepomniachtchi (born 1990), Russian chess grandmaster
- Ian Ormondroyd, English footballer
- Ian O'Brien (born 1947), swimmer
- Ian O'Neill Smith (born 2005), rapper known as ian
- Ian Paice (born 1948), drummer of Deep Purple
- Ian Paisley (1926–2014), Protestant politician
- Ian Parker (keyboardist) (born 1953)
- Ian Parker (psychologist) (born 1956)
- Ian Parker (singer-songwriter) (born 1976)
- Ian Parker (Canadian pianist) (born 1978)
- Ian Patterson (disambiguation), multiple people
- Ian Pearson (badminton) (born 1974), English badminton player
- Ian Peck (born 1957), English cricketer
- Ian Pinard, Dominican politician
- Ian Pooley (born 1973), German DJ
- Ian Poulter (born 1976), English professional golfer
- Ian Punnett (born 1960), American radio broadcaster and priest
- Ian Rankin (born 1960), Scottish novelist
- Ian Reed (1927–2020), Australian discus thrower
- Ian Reid (disambiguation), multiple people
- Ian Richards (disambiguation), multiple people
- Ian Richardson (1934–2007), Scottish actor
- Ian Roberts (South African actor) (born 1951)
- Ian Roberts (rugby league) (born 1965) Australian actor and former professional rugby league footballer
- Ian Roberts (educator) (born 1973), Guyanese-American educator and former Olympic athlete
- Ian Robinson (disambiguation), multiple people
- Ian Ross (disambiguation), multiple people
- Ian Rush (born 1961), Welsh footballer
- Ian Sanders (born 1961), cricketer for Edinburgh, Scotland
- Ian Sangalang (born 1991), Filipino professional basketball player
- Ian Scheckter (born 1947), former South African F1 driver
- Ian Schieffelin (born 2003), American basketball and football player
- Ian Scott (disambiguation), multiple people
- Ian Shaw (actor) (born 1969)
- Ian Smith (disambiguation), multiple people
- Ian Smith (1919–2007), Prime Minister of Rhodesia 1964–1979
- Ian Snell (born 1981), American Major League Baseball pitcher
- Ian Somerhalder (born 1978), actor
- Ian Stanley (born 1957), British musician
- Ian Stannard (born 1987), English cyclist
- Ian Stevenson Webster (1925–2002), British judge
- Ian Stewart (disambiguation), multiple people
- Ian Stone, English comedian
- Ian Strange (British artist) (1934–2018)
- Ian Subiabre (born 2007), Argentine footballer
- Ian Suttie (1945–2025), Scottish businessman
- Ian Svenonius (born 1968), American musician
- Ian Tattersall, (born 1945), American paleoanthropologist
- Ian Terry (game designer) (born 1966)
- Ian Terry (born 1991), American reality show participant, winner of Big Brother 14
- Ian Thomas (disambiguation), multiple people
- Ian Thomson (disambiguation), multiple people
- Ian Thornley (born 1972), Canadian musician
- Ian Thorpe (born 1982), Australian swimmer
- Ian "Sam" Totman (born 1979), British guitarist
- Ian Tracey (born 1964), Canadian actor
- Ian Tripp, American filmmaker and actor
- Ian Tyson (1933–2022), Canadian singer-songwriter
- Ian Van Dahl, Belgian artist
- Ian Veneracion (born 1975), Filipino actor, athlete, pilot, and singer
- Ian Voigt, American sound engineer
- Ian Walker (sailor) (born 1970), British sailor
- Ian Wallace (disambiguation), multiple people
- Ian Waltz (born 1977), American discus thrower
- Ian Watkins (1977–2025), Welsh lead singer of the alternative metal band Lostprophets, and convicted pedophile
- Ian "H" Watkins (born 1976), British pop singer and actor, former member of Steps
- Ian Watkins (rugby union) (born 1963), Wales international rugby union player
- Ian Watson (disambiguation), multiple people
- Ian Weatherhead (born 1932), English watercolor artist
- Ian Webster (born 1986), English footballer
- Ian West (born 1951), Australian politician
- Ian Wheeler (born 1949), New Zealand cricketer
- Ian Wheeler (American football) (born 2001), American football player
- Ian Willcock (born 1959), British composer and academic
- Sir Ian Wilmut (1944–2023), English embryologist, best known for cloning Dolly the sheep
- Ian Wilson (disambiguation), multiple people
- Ian Wingrove (1942–2023), British-American visual effects artist
- Ian Wolfe (1896–1992), American actor
- Ian Wolstenholme (born 1943), English football player and manager
- Ian Wood (disambiguation), multiple people
- Ian Woosnam (born 1958), Welsh golfer
- Ian Wright (born 1963), English footballer
- Ian Yule (1933–2020), South African actor
- Ian Yuill (born 1964), Scottish politician
- Ian Donald Calvin Euclid Zappa, birth name of American musician Dweezil Zappa (born 1969)
- Ian Ziering (born 1964), American actor

=== Surname ===
- Gordon Ian (1930–2006), English racing cyclist
- Janis Ian (born 1951), American singer-songwriter
- Scott Ian (born 1963), American guitarist, stage name of Scott Ian Rosenfeld

== Notable people named Iain ==
- Iain Anders (1933–1997), English actor
- Iain Andrews (born 1975), contemporary English painter
- Iain Archer, Northern Irish Singer-songwriter musician
- Iain Armitage (born 2008), American child actor
- Iain Baird (born 1971), Canadian soccer defender
- Iain Ballamy (born 1964), British composer, soprano, alto and tenor saxophone player
- Iain Balshaw (born 1979), English rugby player
- Iain Bell (born 1980), English composer
- Iain Banks (1954–2013), Scottish writer
- Iain Benson (born 1955), legal philosopher, writer, professor and practising legal consultant
- Iain Black (born 1967), British Columbia politician
- Iain Blair (1942–2011), Scottish actor and author
- Iain Boal, Irish social historian of technics and the commons
- Iain Borden (born 1962), English architectural historian and urban commentator
- Iain Brambell (born 1973), Canadian rower
- Iain Brines (born 1967), former Scottish football referee in the Scottish Premier League
- Iain Brunnschweiler (born 1979), English cricketer
- Iain Burgess (1953–2010), British record producer
- Iain Butchart (born 1960), Zimbabwean cricketer
- Iain Donald Campbell (1941–2014), Scottish biophysicist and academic
- Iain Canning (born 1979), English film producer
- Iain Chambers, English composer, producer and performer
- Iain Michael Chambers, British scholar
- Iain Cheeseman, Australian scientist
- Iain Chisholm (born 1985), Scottish footballer
- Iain Clough (born 1965), British slalom canoer
- Iain Cochrane, 15th Earl of Dundonald (born 1961), British politician and peer
- Iain Coleman (1958–2025), British politician
- Iain Collings, Australian scientist
- Iain Conn (born 1962), British businessman
- Iain Connell (born 1977), Scottish comedian and actor
- Iain Cook (born 1974), Scottish musician
- Iain Coucher (born 1961), British businessman and consultant in the railway industry
- Iain Couzin, British scientist
- Iain Cuthbertson (1930–2009), Scottish actor
- Iain Dale (born 1962), British broadcaster, author and political commentator
- Iain Davidson (born 1984), Scottish professional footballer
- Iain De Caestecker (born 1987), Scottish actor
- Iain Dilthey (born 1971), British film director
- Iain Douglas-Hamilton (1942–2025), British zoologist
- Iain Dowie (born 1965), Northern Irish football manager
- Iain R. Edgar (1948–2021), British social anthropologist
- Iain M. Duguid (born 1960), British theologian and scholar
- Iain Duncan (born 1963), Canadian ice hockey forward
- Iain Duncan Smith (born 1954), Leader of the Conservative Party, 2001–2003
- Iain Dunn (born 1970), English professional footballer
- Iain Durrant (born 1966), Scottish footballer
- Iain Eairdsidh MacAsgaill (1898–1934), Scottish poet and piper
- Iain Evans (born 1959), Australian politician
- Iain Evans (field hockey) (born 1981), South African field hockey player
- Iain Exner (born 1979), Canada international rugby union player
- Iain Fairley (born 1973), Scottish rugby union player
- Iain Fearn (born 1949), Scottish footballer
- Iain Finlay (born 1935), Australian author
- Iain Finlayson (alpine skier) (1951–1990), British alpine skier
- Iain Flannigan (born 1988), Scottish footballer
- Iain Fyfe (born 1982), Australian soccer player
- Iain Gallaway (1922–2021), New Zealand cricketer and broadcaster
- Iain Gardner (born 1970), Scottish film director
- Iain Gillies (1935–2025), New Zealand footballer
- Iain Glen (born 1961), Scottish actor, noted for his role in TV's Game of Thrones
- Iain Gobha na Hearadh (1796–1852), Scottish Gaelic poet
- Iain Gray (born 1957), Leader of Labour in the Scottish Parliament
- Iain Hamilton (disambiguation), multiple people
- Iain Hamilton Grant (born 1963), British philosopher
- Iain Harnden (born 1976), Zimbabwean hurdler
- Iain Henderson (born 1992), professional rugby player for Ulster, Ireland and the British & Irish Lions
- Iain Hewitson (born 1948), Australian television chefs
- Iain Higgins (born 1976), Scotland international rugby league player
- Iain Hook, British aid worker killed by Israeli sniper
- Iain Hughes (born 1950), British Circuit judge
- Iain Jenkins (born 1972), Footballer
- Iain D. Johnston (born 1965), American judge
- Iain Johnstone (1943–2023), English author, broadcaster and television producer
- Iain M. Johnstone (born 1956), Australian born statistician
- Iain Kay (born 1949), Zimbabwean farmer and politician
- Iain Laughland (1935–2020), Scotland international rugby union player
- Iain Lee (born 1973), British comedian, TV presenter and radio presenter
- Iain Lindsay (born 1959), British diplomat
- Iain Livingstone (born 1966), Scottish solicitor and former police officer
- Iain Luke (born 1951), British politician
- Iain Macleod (1913–1970), British politician
- Iain Macmillan (1938–2006), Scottish photographer, noted for his image of the Beatles walking across Abbey Road
- Iain Macwhirter (born 1952), Scottish political journalist
- Iain McCaig (born 1957), American artist, writer, and filmmaker
- Iain McChesney (1944–2024), Scottish footballer
- Iain McColl (1954–2013), British actor
- Iain McInnes (born 1964), British rheumatologist
- Iain David McGeachy (1948–2009), birth name of John Martyn, British singer-songwriter and guitarist
- Iain McGilchrist (born 1953), psychiatrist, writer, and former Oxford literary scholar
- Iain McKenzie (born 1959), Scottish politician
- Iain McNicol (born 1969), British politician and trade unionist
- Iain McPeake (born 1991), New Zealand cricketer
- Iain Matthews (born 1946), formerly known as Ian Matthews, English musician, singer-songwriter, member of Fairport Convention
- Iain Morland (born 1978), British music technologist and author
- Iain Morrison (rugby union) (born 1962), Scottish rugby union player
- Iain Morrison (rugby league) (born 1983), English rugby league player
- Iain Morrison (musician), Scottish musician
- Iain Nicolson (born 1976), Scottish footballer
- Iain Noble (1935–2010), British businessman, Scottish Gaelic language activist
- Iain O'Brien (born 1976), New Zealand cricketer
- Iain Pattinson (1953–2021), British scriptwriter
- Iain Paxton (born 1957), Scottish rugby player
- Iain Priestley (born 1967), English cricketer
- Iain Quarrier (1941–2016), Canadian actor
- Iain Ramsay (born 1988), Filipino professional footballer
- Iain Rice (1947–2022), Model railway enthusiast
- Iain Robertson (born 1981), Scottish actor
- Iain Russell (born 1982), Scottish footballer
- Iain Sharp (1953–2026), New Zealand poet
- Iain Smith (Scottish politician) (born 1960), Scottish politician
- Iain R. Smith (1939–2021), British historian
- Iain Smythe (born in 1985), Canadian male field hockey player
- Iain Softley (born 1958), film director
- Iain Sproat (1938–2011), British politician
- Iain Steel (born 1971), Malaysian professional golfer
- Iain Stewart (disambiguation), multiple people
- Iain Maxwell Stewart (1916–1985), Scottish industrialist
- Iain Stirling (born 1988), Scottish TV presenter and comedian
- Iain Sutcliffe (born 1974), English cricketer
- Iain Sutherland (conductor) (born 1936), British conductor
- Iain Sutherland (diplomat) (1925–1986), British diplomat
- Iain Sydie (born 1969), Canadian badminton player
- Iain Tennant (1919–2006), British businessman
- Iain Torrance (born 1949), President of Princeton Theological Seminary
- Iain Turner (born 1984), Scottish footballer and coach
- Iain Vigurs (born 1988), Scottish footballer
- Iain Wainwright (born 1949), South African cricketer
- Iain Weaver (born 1990), English boxer
- Iain Wright (born 1972), British politician

== Fictional characters ==
- Iain Dean, a fictional character in the Casualty Central universe
- Ian Beale, from the TV soap opera EastEnders
- Ian Chesterton, from the TV series Doctor Who
- Ian Edgerton, FBI agent and sniper from the show Numb3rs
- Ian Gallagher, from the television drama Shameless
- Ian Hawke, from Alvin and the Chipmunks live-action/CGI film series
- Ian Malcolm (Jurassic Park), from Michael Crichton's novel Jurassic Park
- Janis Ian (Mean Girls), from the film Mean Girls

== See also ==
- Ian (disambiguation)
- IANS (disambiguation)
- Eoin
- Ioan
- John (given name), a common masculine given name in the English language of originally Semitic origin
- List of storms named Ian
