= Ian Wallace =

Ian Wallace is the name of:

== Arts and entertainment ==
- Ian Wallace (author) (1912–1998), science fiction author
- Ian Wallace (drummer) (1946–2007), drummer with King Crimson, Bob Dylan, and many others
- Ian Wallace (illustrator) (born 1950), illustrator of children's books
- Ian Wallace (photographer) (born 1972), Tasmanian landscape photographer
- Ian Wallace (bass-baritone) (1919–2009), singer and contestant on My Music
- Ian "Nion" Wallace, Canadian performance artist

== Other ==
- Ian Wallace (ornithologist) (1933–2021), British ornithologist and natural history author
- Ian Wallace (artist) (born 1943), pioneer of Vancouver's conceptual art movement
- Ian Wallace (Australian footballer) (born 1950), Australian footballer for Footscray
- Ian Wallace (footballer, born 1956), Scottish international footballer
