= Ian (disambiguation) =

Ian is a common given name of Scottish Gaelic origin. It is a version of the name John.

Ian or IAN may also refer to:

== IAN ==
- Inferior alveolar nerve, in biology
- International Article Number
- Internet area network
- IATA airport code for Bob Baker Memorial Airport, Kiana, Alaska

== Ian ==
- "Ian", a song by White Town from Socialism, Sexism & Sexuality
- Ian., the abbreviation of the month of January in the Roman calendar
- ian (rapper), American rapper, songwriter and record producer
- List of storms named Ian
- Mount Ian, a mountain in New Zealand

== See also ==
- IANS (disambiguation)
