= Ian Davison =

Ian Davison may refer to:

- Ian Davison (cricketer) (1937–2017), English cricketer
- Ian Davison (footballer) (born 1945), Australian footballer
- Ian Davison (white supremacist) (born 1967/1968), British white supremacist
- Ian Hay Davison (1931–2022), British accountant

== See also ==
- Ian Davidson (disambiguation)
