= Ian Carroll =

Ian Carroll may refer to:

- Ian Carroll (Australian TV executive) (1946–2011)
- Ian Carroll (software developer) (born 2000)

== See also ==
- Ian Carnell, Australian public servant (born 1955)
- Ida Carroll, British musician (1905–1995)
- Ian Arrol, Canadian politician (1924–2000)
