= Ian Watson =

Ian Watson may refer to:

- Ian Watson (author) (1943–2026), British science fiction author
- Ian Watson (basketball) (1949–1981), Australian Olympic basketball player
- Ian Watson (cricketer) (born 1947), English cricketer
- Ian Watson (director), Australian filmmaker, director of several episodes of 2014 TV series ANZAC Girls
- Ian Watson (footballer, born 1944), English footballer
- Ian Watson (footballer, born 1960), English footballer for Sunderland
- Ian Watson (football coach) (born 1985), English football manager
- Ian Watson (priest) (born 1950), Archdeacon of Coventry
- Ian Watson (politician) (1934–2023), Liberal party member of the Canadian House of Commons
- Ian Watson (rugby league) (born 1976), Welsh rugby league footballer
- Ian Watson (ice hockey), ice hockey goaltender
- Iain Watson, British journalist and BBC political correspondent
