= Ian Reid =

Ian Reid may refer to:

- Ian Reid (Alberta politician) (1931–2016), member of the Legislative Assembly of Alberta
- Ian Reid (footballer) (born 1951), Scottish footballer (Queen of the South)
- Ian Reid (manager) (fl. 1970s), original manager of XTC
- Ian Reid (sport shooter), British sports shooter
- Ian Reid (Newfoundland and Labrador politician) (born 1952), former member of the Parliament of Canada
- Ian Reid (Scottish clergyman), leader of the Iona Community 1967–1974
- Ian Reid (poet), co-founder of Friendly Street Poets in Adelaide, 1975
- Ian Reid (endocrinologist), 2015 recipient of the Rutherford Medal
- Ian D. Reid, computer scientist

== See also ==
- Ian Read (born 1953), American business executive, CEO of Pfizer
- Ian Read (musician), English neofolk and traditional folk musician
- Ian Reed (1927–2020), Australian discus thrower
- Iain Reid (born 1981), Canadian novelist
