= Ian Stuart =

Ian Stuart may refer to:

- Ian Stuart (cricketer) (born 1964), South African cricketer
- Ian Stuart, nom de plume of Scottish novelist Alistair MacLean (1922–1987)
- Ian Stuart Donaldson (1957–1993), English musician, singer and songwriter; sometimes known as Ian Stuart
- Ian Stuart (designer) (1967–2022), British fashion designer
- Ian Stuart (bishop) (born 1942), bishop of the Anglican Church of Australia and the Church of England
- Ian Stuart (rugby union) (born 1961), Canadian rugby player

== See also ==
- Ian Stewart (disambiguation)
