= Ryder Richards =

American artist and writer

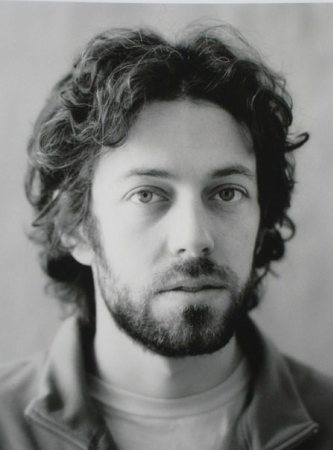
- artist Ryder Richards, photo by Jane Huntington, 2008
- Born: Damon Ryder Richards; 1977 (age 48–49); Roswell, New Mexico, U.S.
- Education: Texas A&M University, Texas Tech University [BFA]
- Alma mater: Texas Christian University [MFA]
- Notable work: Gunpowder Drawing, Redaction of Labor
- Style: contemporary social critique

Ryder Richards (born 1977) is an American artist, writer, and curator. He works in the field of conceptual art, critical theory, and installation. His art practice consists of several bodies of work, often researching cultural violence, conspiracy voids and architectural influence. He has participated in several collaborative art groups.

== Early life and education ==
Richards was born in 1977 in Roswell, New Mexico. He was raised in Roswell, and moved to Lubbock, Texas in 1994.

In 2001, he attained a bachelor's degree in painting and drawing with a minor in architecture from Texas Tech University. His master's degree in painting was awarded from Texas Christian University in 2003. During his studies he attended the Europäische Kunstakademie in Trier, Germany (2002) and Lorenzo De Medici Art Institute in Florence, Italy (2000).

== Career ==
From 2005 to 2010 Richards opened and directed two alternative gallery spaces, Art Depot and Art Depot Annex, in Lubbock, Texas becoming the Gallery Director of Richland College from 2009 to 2012. Richards has taught at Texas Tech University and Texas Christian University. He currently teaches sculpture and drawing at Eastfield College.

Richards has participated in several artist-in-residence programs, most recently spending one year in Roswell, New Mexico (2012–13). Richards has exhibited at the Bellevue Museum, Seattle; Roswell Museum, Roswell, NM; Antena, Chicago; Falling Water, Pennsylvania; Olm Space, Nuechatel, Switzerland; Seed Space, Nashville; Olive Tjaden Gallery, Cornell University, Ithaca, NY; Monkskirche, Tangermunde, Germany; C2 Pottery Gallery, China; BlueOrange, Houston; as well as The Power Station, The Reading Room, and Gray Matters in Dallas. He has participated in the Texas Biennial 2011 and 2013 and the Dallas Biennial 2012 and 2014. Richards has works in the permanent collections of the Anderson Museum of Contemporary Art, and Roswell Museum.

== Collaborative practice ==
In 2007 he co-founded the RJP Nomadic Gallery with Jonathan Whitfill and Piotr Chizinski. The project converts a 24-foot Ryder truck into a traveling exhibition space. The project has led to over 20 exhibits including participation in the Texas Biennial 2011 and exhibiting at Blue Star Contemporary in San Antonio, Texas. In 2011 the founders developed the “RJP Nomadic Gallery Kit 2.0,” an open-source gallery model displayed in the traveling exhibit CTRL+P at Houston Center for Craft in Houston, Texas and Center for Craft, Creativity, and Design in Asheville, North Carolina.

In 2009 Richards became a founding member of Culture Laboratory Collective, an American internet-based collective “working loosely around the question of social cohesion within the context of aesthetic fragmentation.” The Culture Laboratory Collective has worked with contemporary art critics such as Ben Lewis and Noah Simblist. It has conducted exhibitions at locations such as The Nave Museum, in Victoria, Texas as well as in Jingdezhen, Beijing, and Shanghai, China.

In 2012 he became a member of The Art Foundation, a Dallas-based collective who have had a collaborative book, Fountainhead, accepted into the Nasher Sculpture Center, curated Boom Town at the Dallas Museum of Art, and created an installation at The Reading Room for the Texas Biennial 2013.

In 2012, he exhibited a collaborative piece, created with artist Ian F. Thomas, at the 2012 NCECA Invitational Exhibition, located at The Bellevue Arts Museum in Washington.

== Curating ==
Richards has curated numerous exhibits during his tenure as the gallery director of Art Depot, Art Depot Annex, Richland College Galleries, The Cube and in his role as a member of the RJP Nomadic Gallery and Culture Laboratory Collective. Notable curated exhibits include “Boom Town” at the Dallas Museum of Art, Dallas; “Mute: a regional quarterly” at Circuit 12 Contemporary, Dallas; RJP Nomadic Gallery's “Dark Matter” at Blue Star, San Antonio; Culture Laboratory's “Response: Ben Lewis” and “Response: Noah Simblist” exhibited in Houston, Ithaca, and Slippery Rock, PA, and “Construct” at Brazos Gallery, Dallas and Art Depot, Lubbock.

== Publishing ==
Richards has written art reviews for D Magazine Front Row, Glasstire, Art Now Nashville, semigloss. Magazine, and Cornell Press graduate catalogs. In 2014 he founded and is the editor for Eutopia: Contemporary Art Review, “a concise means to access contemporary art" with 100 word reviews.

Richards has also had several interviews and articles written about his work.

== Lectures and events ==
Ryder has moderated panel discussions for the Texas Association of Schools of Art conference in 2011, the Dallas Art Fair in 2012, “Art in the Public Sphere” at McKinney Avenue Contemporary, and “Water: More or Less” Symposium at Richland College in 2009. He has participated in panel discussion for the Dallas Biennial 2014 at the McKinney Avenue Contemporary, “Boom Town” at the Dallas Museum of Art, “The Community College as Site for Alternative Art” at the Community College Humanities Association National Conference, and “Off Center” for Texas Association of Schools of Art. He has lectured at the Dallas Museum of Art, Roswell Museum of Art; Fordham University, New York; Arthouse, Austin; and McKinney Avenue Contemporary, Dallas, Texas.
