= Ian Thomas =

Ian Thomas may refer to:

- Ian Thomas (baseball) (born 1987), baseball player
- Ian Thomas (cricketer) (born 1979), Welsh cricketer
- Ian Thomas (dressmaker) (1929–1993), English dressmaker to Queen Elizabeth II
- Ian Thomas (umpire) (born 1950), Australian cricket umpire
- Ian Thomas (American football) (born 1996), American football tight end
- Ian Thomas (Belgian musician) (born 1997), Belgian singer
- Ian Thomas (Canadian musician) (born 1950), Canadian singer-songwriter
- Ian Thomas (town clerk) (born 1969), Town Clerk of London
- Ian Thomas (speedway promoter) (1942–2011), British speedway promoter
- Ian C. Thomas (born 1963), Australian comics artist
- Ian F. Thomas (born 1976), American installation artist
- W. Ian Thomas (1914–2007), Christian speaker and author

== See also ==
- Thomas Ian Griffith (born 1962), American actor
- Thomas Ian Nicholas (born 1980), American actor
