= Ian Ross =

Ian Ross may refer to:

- Ian Ross (playwright) (1968–2025), Métis playwright
- Ian Ross (footballer, born 1947) (1947–2019), Scottish football player for Liverpool and Aston Villa, manager of Huddersfield Town
- Ian Ross (footballer, born 1974), Scottish football player for Motherwell, St. Mirren and Partick Thistle
- Ian Ross (footballer, born 1986), former Sheffield United trainee still active in non-league football
- Ian Ross (newsreader) (1940–2014), Australian television news presenter
- Sir Ian Clunies Ross (1899–1959), Australian veterinary scientist and science administrator
- Ian Munro Ross (1927–2013), pioneer in transistors and President of Bell Labs
- Ian Ross (journalist) (born 1955), former sports journalist and author
- Ian Simpson Ross (1930–2015), Scottish academic

== See also ==
- Iain Ross (1928–2024), Scottish rugby union player
