= Ian F. Thomas =

American sculptor

- Born: May 10, 1976
- Known for: Ceramic Art, Installation Art

Ian F. Thomas (born 1976) is an American installation artist formally trained in ceramics. He currently lives and works in Slippery Rock, Pennsylvania and is an Assistant Professor of Art at Allegheny College.

== Early life and education ==
Ian F. Thomas was raised in Western Pennsylvania where he spent much of his time on a family farm. It is here where Thomas first became interested in objects and the notion of art as a form of play. The coupling of this rural setting with a sense of childhood imagination has become a foundation for much of Thomas' artistic investigations to this day.

In 1999, Thomas received his bachelor's degree from Slippery Rock University. During this time, he also studied at The Academy of Fine Art and Design in Bratislava, Slovakia. After graduating, He became a studio assistant to ceramic artist Edward Eberle. Thomas has also worked with James Watkins, Von Venhuizen, and Juan Granados at Texas Tech University where he received his MFA in 2006.

== Career ==
Since 2007, Thomas has been an active ceramic arts demonstrator across the country. He has lectured and given demonstrations at Cornell University, East Carolina University, and The Jingdezhen Ceramic Institute, among others. He has also been an active force in experimental collaboration within the fine art world.

In 2009, Thomas founded the Culture Laboratory Collective, a group of twelve artists from across the country who all work with ideas of social cohesion without conforming their own personal aesthetics. The Culture Laboratory Collective has worked with contemporary art critics such as Ben Lewis and Noah Simblist. It has conducted exhibitions at locations such as The Nave Museum, in Victoria, Texas as well as in Jingdezhen, Beijing, and Shanghai, China.

Thomas has exhibited work internationally and appeared in numerous publications. In 2010, Thomas exhibited a performative installation entitled "The Ergonomics of Futility" with photographer, Shreepad Joglekar, at RO2 Gallery in Dallas, Texas. In 2012, he exhibited a collaborative piece, created with artist Ryder Richards, at the 2012 NCECA Invitational Exhibition, located at The Bellevue Arts Museum in Washington.
