= Ian Stewart =

Ian Stewart may refer to:

== Military ==
- Ian Stewart (RAF officer), current United Kingdom National Military Representative, Supreme Headquarters Allied Powers Europe
- Ian MacAlister Stewart (1895–1987), brigadier general during the Second World War
- Ian Michael Stewart, former senior commander in the Royal Air Force

== Politics ==
- Ian Stewart (Labour politician) (born 1950), Scottish politician
- Ian Stewart, Baron Stewartby (1935–2018), British Conservative Party politician and former MP for Hitchin, England

== Sports ==
- Ian Stewart (runner) (born 1949), Scottish Olympic athlete
- Ian Stewart (Australian rules footballer) (born 1943), member of the Australian Football Hall of Fame
- Ian Stewart (baseball) (born 1985), major league baseball player
- Ian Stewart (Northern Ireland footballer) (born 1961), member of the 1986 Northern Ireland Football World Cup team
- Ian Stewart (racing driver) (1929–2017), Scottish Formula One driver
- Ian Stewart (Scottish footballer) (born 1945/46), Scottish football player and manager

== Others ==
- Ian Stewart (mathematician) (born 1945), English academic and science fiction author
- Ian Stewart (musician) (1938–1985), British musician and early member of the Rolling Stones
- Ian Stewart (police commissioner), former Commissioner of the Queensland Police Service (2012–2019)
- Ian Stewart, founder of Gremlin Interactive and Zoo Digital
- Ian Stewart (priest) (born 1943), Dean of Brechin
- Ian Charles Stewart (born 1958), entrepreneur and co-founder of Wired magazine
- Ian Duncan Stewart (1938–2017), or Ian Brady, British serial killer and author
- Ian Edward Stewart (1908–1989), English pianist and bandleader, Savoy Orpheans

== See also ==
- Iain Stewart (disambiguation)
- Ian Stuart (disambiguation)
