= Ian Wallace (Australian footballer) =

Australian rules footballer

Personal information
- Full name: Ian Wallace
- Born: 3 November 1950 (age 76)
- Original team: West Footscray
- Height: 173 cm (5 ft 8 in)
- Weight: 68 kg (150 lb)

Playing career^{1}
Years	Club	Games (Goals)
1968	Footscray	2 (0)
- ^{1} Playing statistics correct to the end of 1968.

Ian Wallace (born 3 November 1950) is a former Australian rules footballer who played with Footscray in the Victorian Football League (VFL).
