= IANS (disambiguation) =

IANS may refer to:

- Indo-Asian News Service, Indian news agency
- Institute of Air Navigation Services (IANS), a division of European Organisation for the Safety of Air Navigation

== See also ==
- Ian (disambiguation)
