= Iain Stewart =

Iain Stewart may refer to:

- Iain Stewart, drummer and member of Scottish indie rock band The Phantom Band
- Iain Stewart (Canadian official), former president of the Public Health Agency of Canada from 2020 to 2021
- Iain Stewart (footballer) (born 1969), Scottish football player and manager
- Iain Stewart (geologist) (born 1964), Scottish geologist
- Iain Stewart (physicist), Canadian-American theoretical nuclear and particle physicist
- Iain Stewart (politician) (born 1972), British Conservative Member of Parliament for Milton Keynes South
- Iain Maxwell Stewart (1916–1985), Scottish industrialist

== See also ==
- Ian Stewart (disambiguation)
