= Ian Hicks =

Ian Hicks may refer to:

- Birth name of Baron Mordant, see Skull Disco
- Birth name of Hixxy, happy hardcore musician
- Ian Hicks, electronic musician (fl. 1980–1987) in Portion Control (band)
