= 1991–92 Australian region cyclone season =

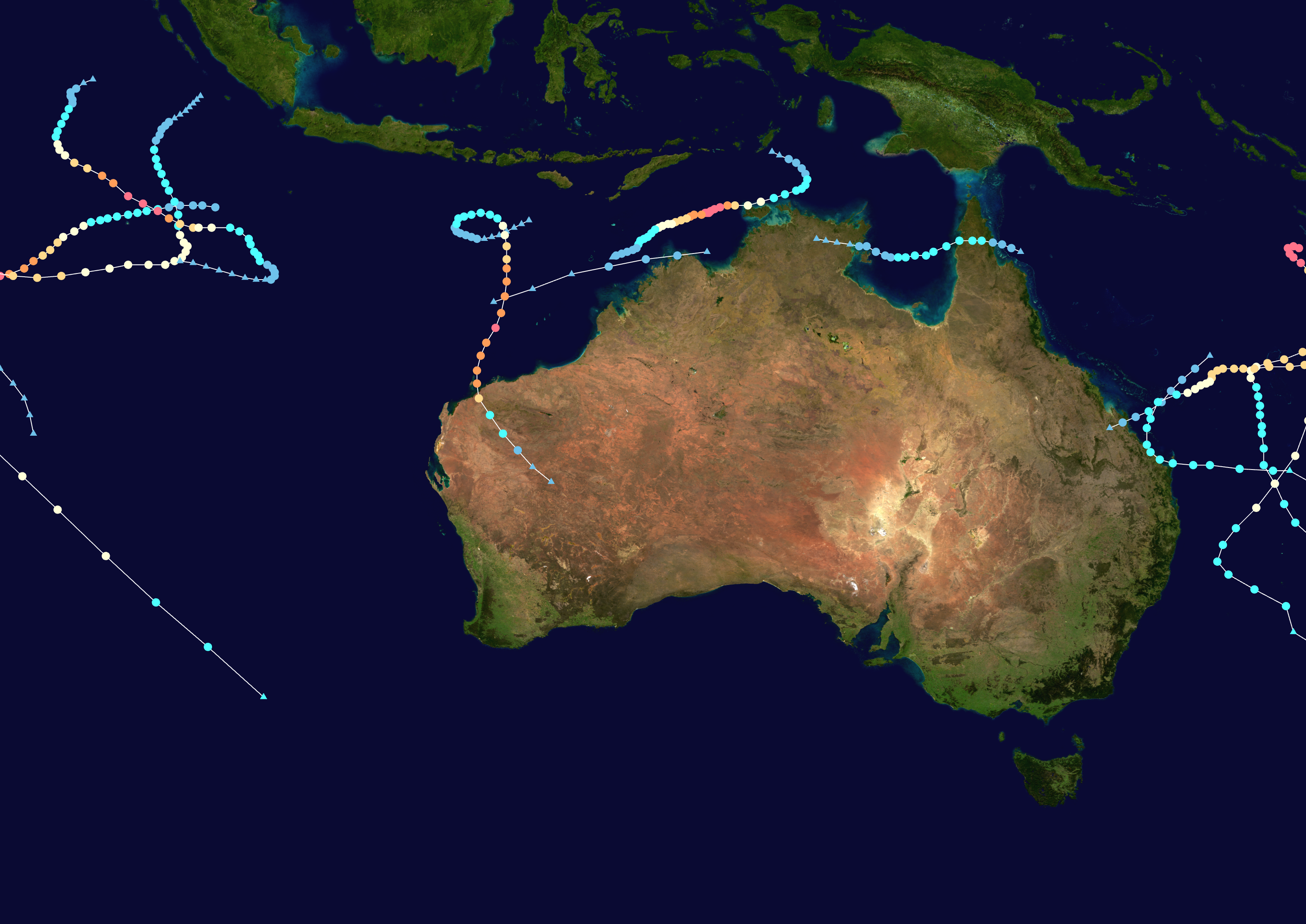
- Season summary map

Seasonal boundaries
- First system formed: 2 December 1991
- Last system dissipated: 13 April 1992

Strongest storm
- Name: Graham
  - Maximum winds: 205 km/h (125 mph) (10-minute sustained)
  - Lowest pressure: 915 hPa (mbar)

Seasonal statistics
- Tropical lows: 12
- Tropical cyclones: 10
- Severe tropical cyclones: 9
- Total fatalities: 7
- Total damage: $13.94 million (1992 USD)

Related articles
- 1991–92 South-West Indian Ocean cyclone season; 1991–92 South Pacific cyclone season

The 1991–92 Australian region cyclone season saw several intense storms. It was also an event in the ongoing cycle of tropical cyclone formation. It ran from 1 November 1991 to 30 April 1992. The regional tropical cyclone operational plan also defines a tropical cyclone year separately from a tropical cyclone season, and the "tropical cyclone year" ran from 1 July 1991 to 30 June 1992.

Tropical cyclones in this area were monitored by four Tropical Cyclone Warning Centres (TCWCs): the Australian Bureau of Meteorology in Perth, Darwin, and Brisbane; and TCWC Port Moresby in Papua New Guinea.

== Systems ==
=== Severe Tropical Cyclone Graham ===
- Category 5 severe tropical cyclone (Australian scale)
- Category 4 tropical cyclone (SSHWS)
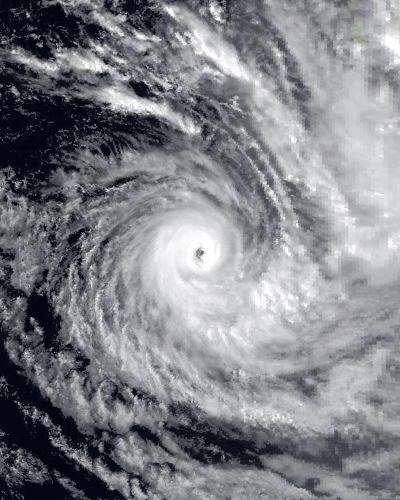
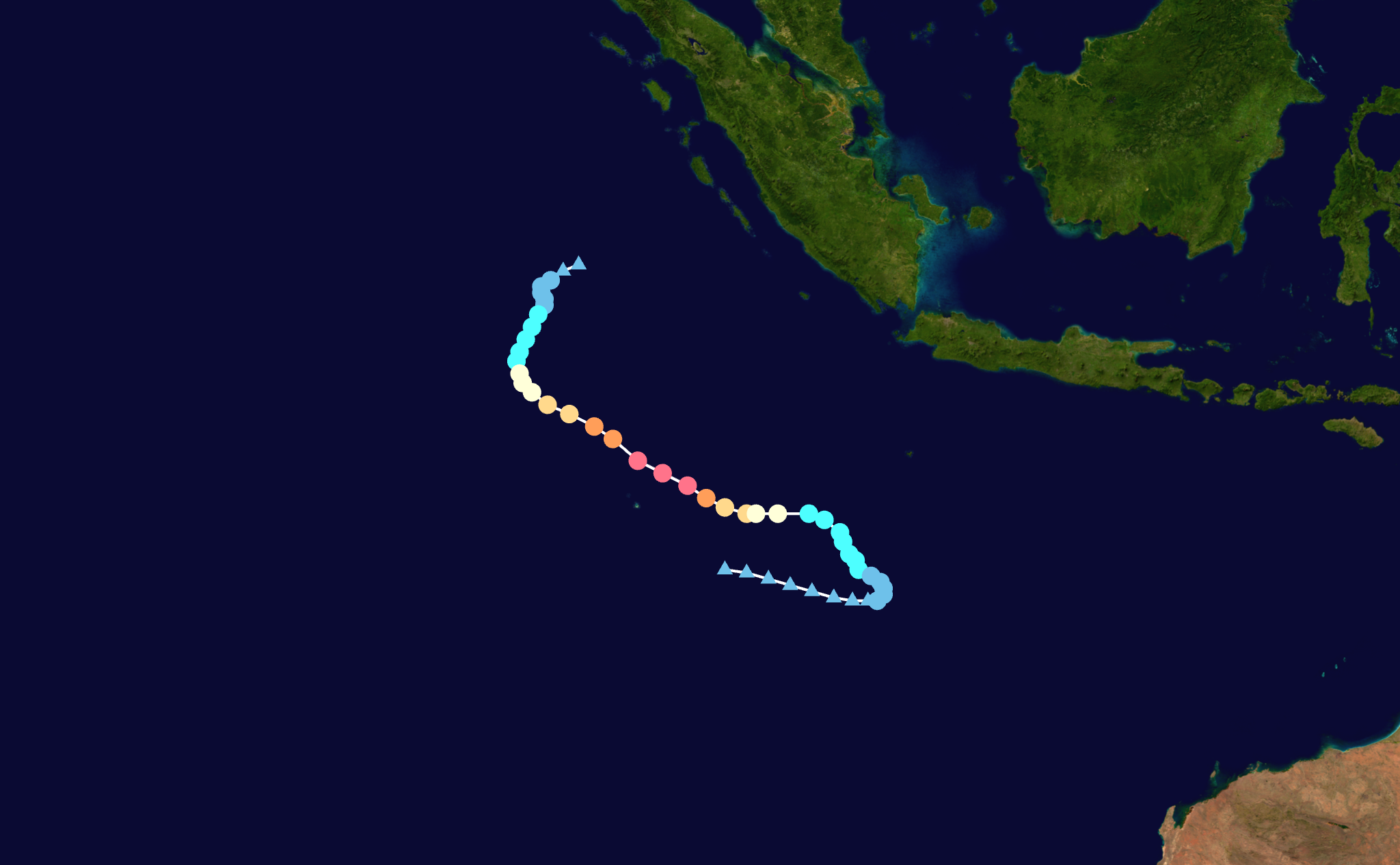
- Duration: 2 December – 12 December
- Peak intensity: 205 km/h (125 mph) (10-min); 915 hPa (mbar)

On 2 December, a south-southwesterly moving low pressure system formed. Rapidly intensifying, Tropical cyclone Graham was classified the next day about 750 km (470 mi) northwest of Cocos Island. Within 24 hours, an eye developed. Shortly thereafter, Graham turned towards the southeast due to influence of a deep-layer anticyclone to the east. Maximum intensity was reached at 1500 UTC 5 December as a Category 5 system. As the cyclone tracked away from Cocos Island, it encountered less favorable conditions. By 0000 UTC 8 December, the low-level circulation became fully exposed on the northwest side of the deep convection. Graham weakened below cyclone intensity at 1800 UTC 9 December and became devoid of convection the next day.

=== Tropical Cyclone Mark ===
- Category 2 tropical cyclone (Australian scale)
- Tropical storm (SSHWS)
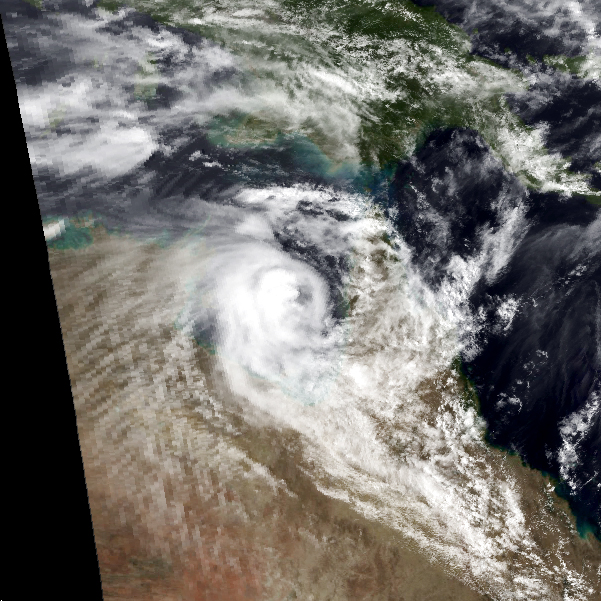
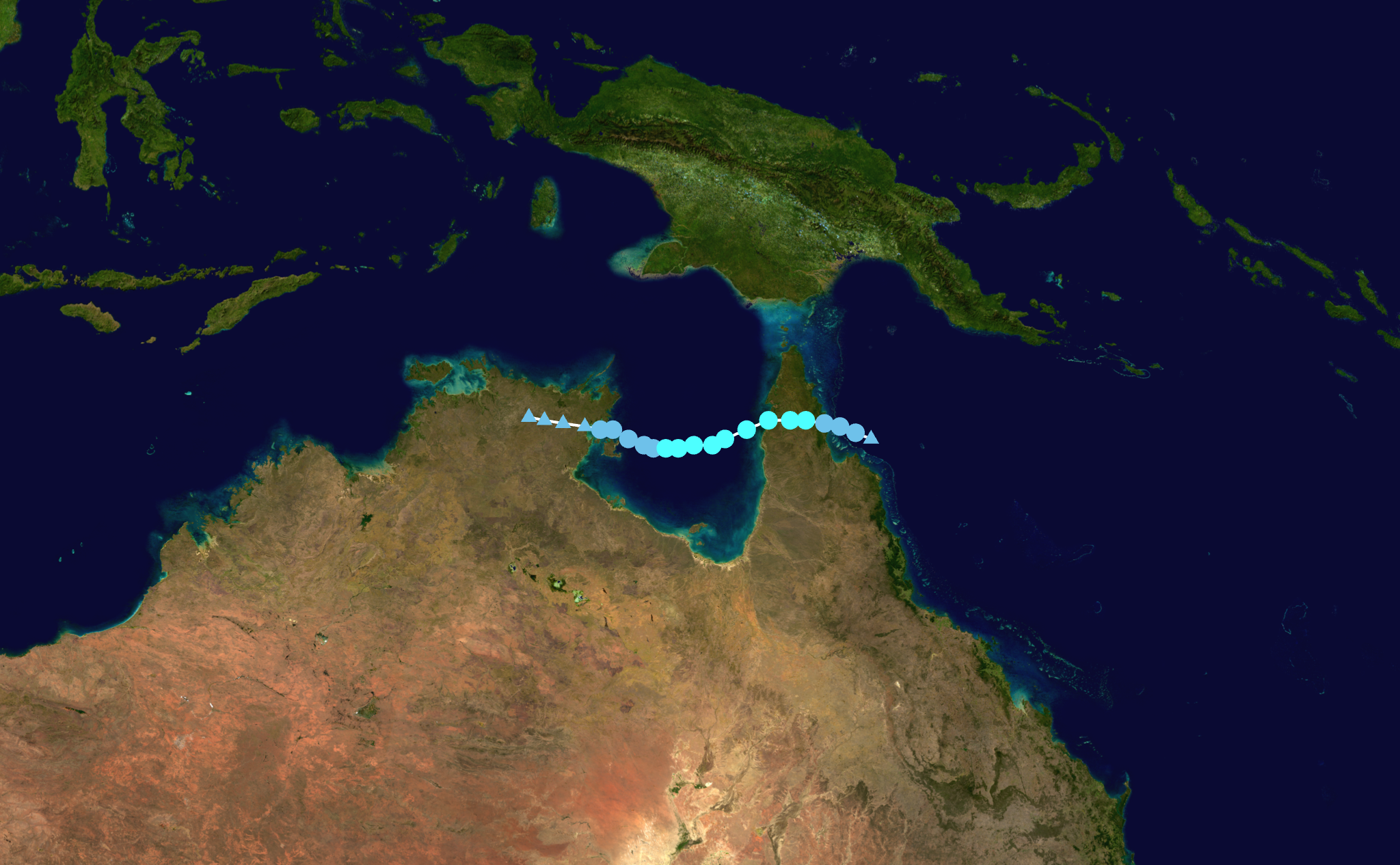
- Duration: 7 January – 10 January
- Peak intensity: 100 km/h (65 mph) (10-min); 980 hPa (mbar)

Tropical cyclone Mark formed within the monsoon trough in the Timor Sea, west of Melville Island, on 6 January. The system tracked rapidly eastwards across northern Australia, entering the Gulf of Carpentaria at 1200 UTC 7 January. Once over water, satellite imagery indicated that the system slowly organized and by 0600 UTC 8 January, whilst approaching the central Gulf of Carpentaria, it was upgraded into a Category 1 cyclone. Upon naming, Mark slowed and adopted a slightly northeastward track in response to enhanced ridging to the south. This track was maintained for the next 40 hours and at 2100 UTC 9 January, Mark crossed the western coast of Cape York Peninsula just south of Weipa. Maximum sustained winds at landfall were estimated at 100 km/h (62 mph) with a central pressure of 980 mbar (29 inHg). Mark soon weakened as it crossed the peninsula and was downgraded to a tropical depression at 1200 UTC 10 January. Mark dissipated later that day. Weipa sustained minor, but widespread damage with failing trees often being a consequence for damage to houses and power lines. High waves brought $3.5 million (AUD) damage to the Weipa port.

=== Severe Tropical Cyclone Betsy ===
- Category 4 severe tropical cyclone (Australian scale)
- Category 2 tropical cyclone (SSHWS)
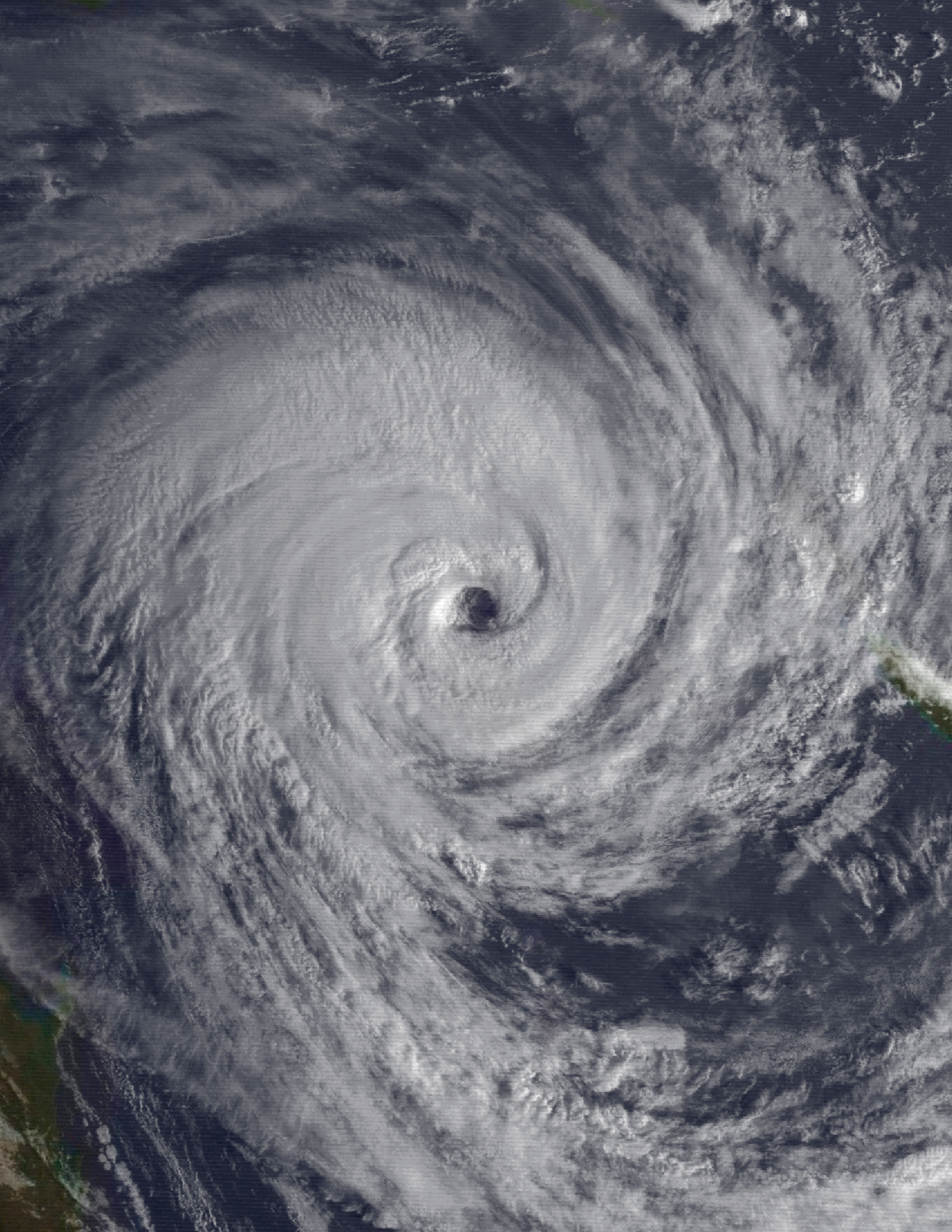
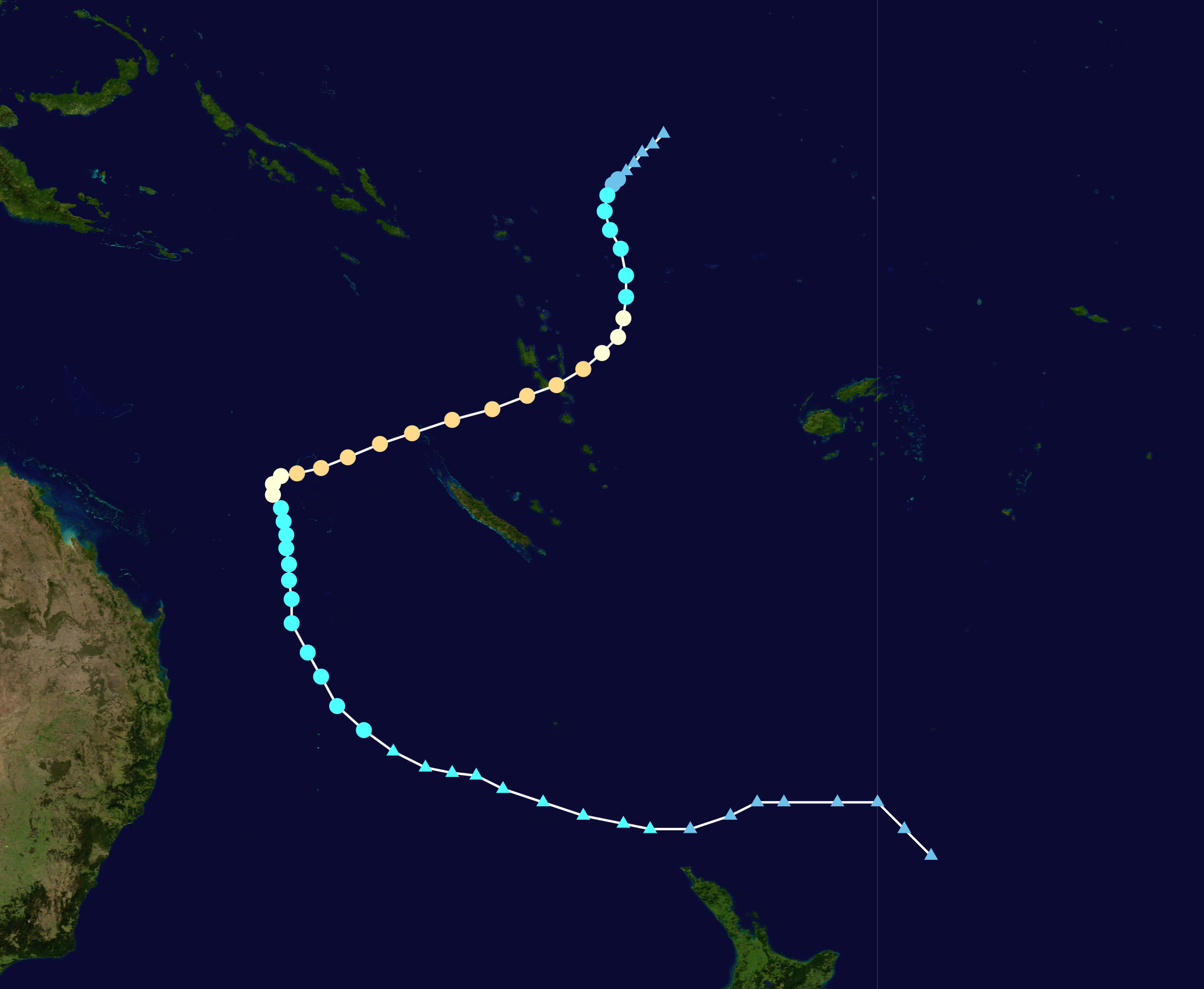
- Duration: 10 January (entered basin) – 14 January (exited basin)
- Peak intensity: 165 km/h (105 mph) (10-min); 950 hPa (mbar)

A deep depression formed from gale-force westerlies on 5 January. The depression continued to intensify as it drifted slowly west and became a Category 1 cyclone the next day. During the next 12 hours, Betsy rapidly intensified while moving south-southeast slowly. Mean winds associated with the cyclone reached storm-force late on 7 January and the system turned to the southwest and subsequently the cyclone approached the central Vanuatu Islands. By 1800 UTC 8 January, Besty developed hurricane-force winds. Six hours later, the core of the cyclone struck the islands of Ambrym and Malakula in central Vanuatu while developing a large ragged eye. Betsy continued to intensify after existing Vanuatu, and reached maximum intensity very early on 10 January while located 200 km (120 mi) north of New Caledonia. By 11 January, Besty had become less organized. Meanwhile, the eye shrunk and became ragged. was losing organisation, with the large eye (diameter of 165 km) rapidly shrinking and becoming elongated and ragged. Midday 11 January, Betsy recurved sharply to the south and by 13 January Betsy had dissipated. However, the extratropical remnants passed close to the northern coast of New Zealand on 17 January. On Malakula, sustained winds of 118 km/h (73 mph) were recorded between 0400 and 0500 UTC 9 January and the pressure dropped to 959 mbar (28.3 inHg). Tropical cyclone Betsy was blamed for significant damage in Vanuatu and was responsible for the deaths of two people. The worst impact was felt on Efate, where there was a 3 m (9.8 ft) storm surge.

=== Severe Tropical Cyclone Daman ===
- Category 3 severe tropical cyclone (Australian scale)
- Category 1 tropical cyclone (SSHWS)
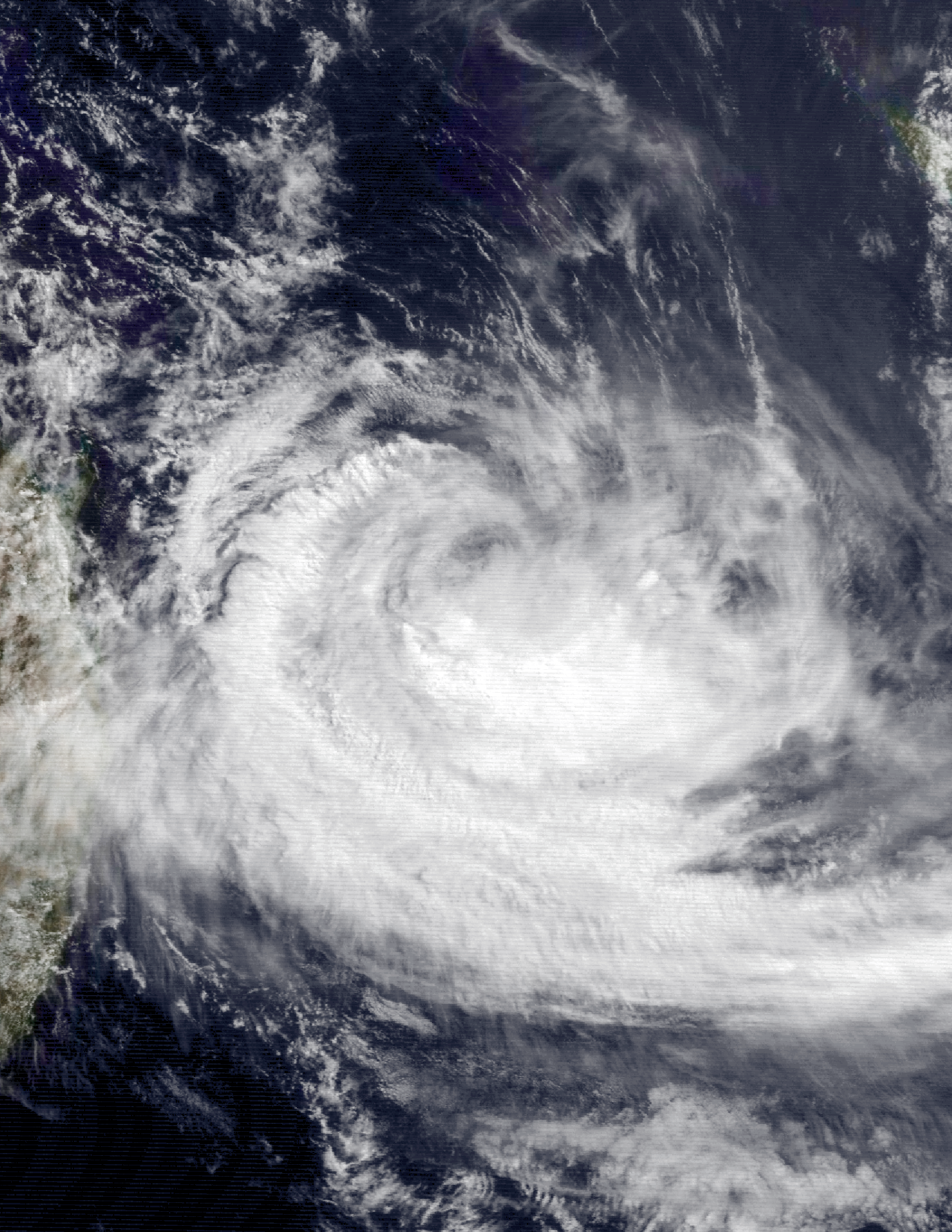
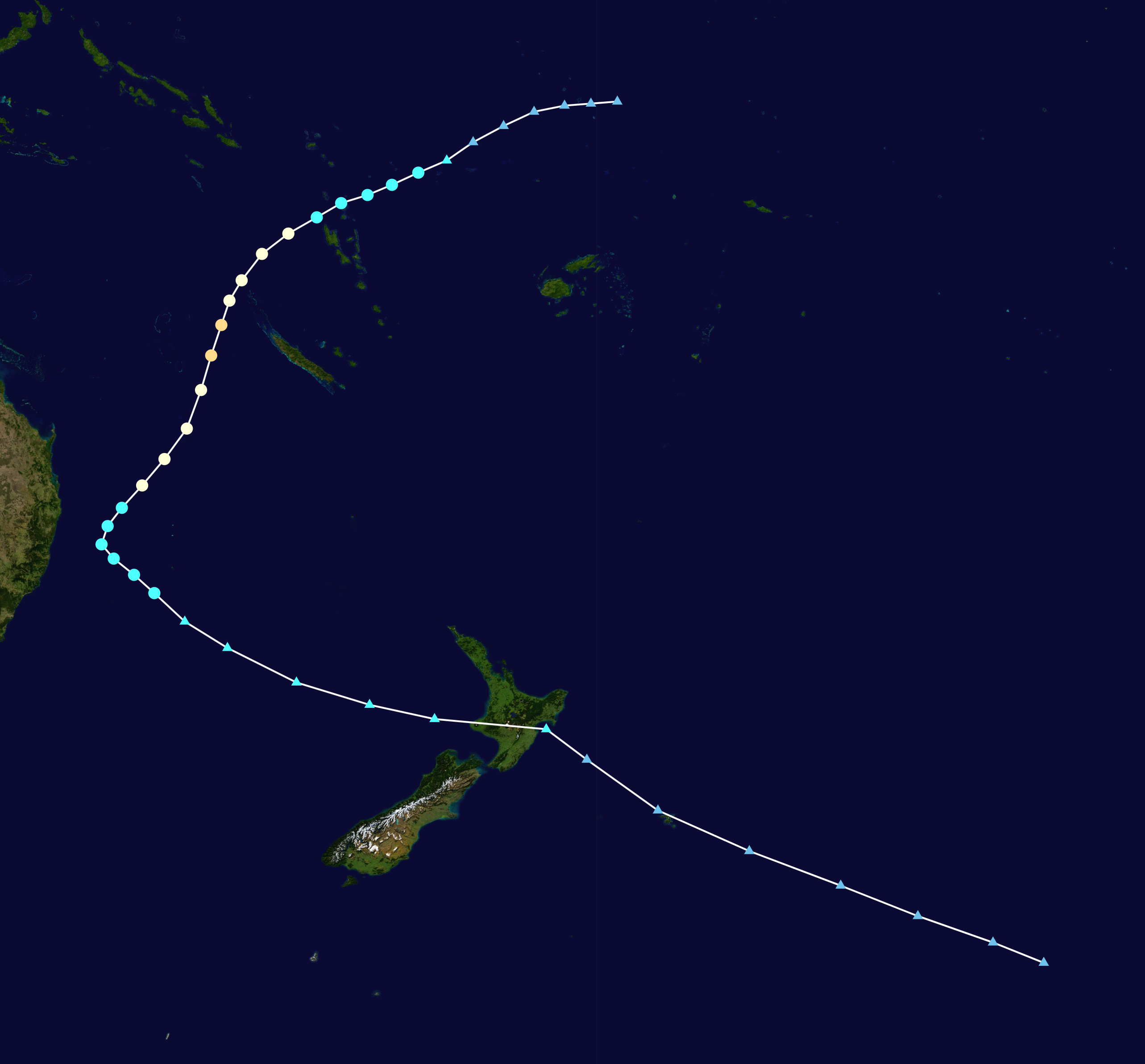
- Duration: 17 February (Crossed 160°E) – 19 February
- Peak intensity: 120 km/h (75 mph) (10-min); 965 hPa (mbar)

A tropical depression formed in the south Pacific on 11 February. The system steadily developed, and was named Daman on 15 February. Twelve hours later, the cyclone skirted Vanua Lava before passing northwest of Espiritu Santo. After emerging into Coral Sea, Cyclone Daman began curving to the southwest, and then south-southwest. On 17 February, it peaked in intensity as a Category 3 cyclone. The system began weakening shortly thereafter as environmental shear increased, and by Daman was no longer a tropical cyclone. Soon afterwards, the extratropical remnants turned rapidly eastwards, bringing gale-force winds to parts of the North Island of New Zealand. At Manukau Heads, a wind gust of 205 km/h (127 mph) was recorded. Significant tree damage and downed power lines were reported in Auckland.

=== Severe Tropical Cyclone Harriet-Heather ===
- Category 4 severe tropical cyclone (Australian scale)
- Category 4 tropical cyclone (SSHWS)
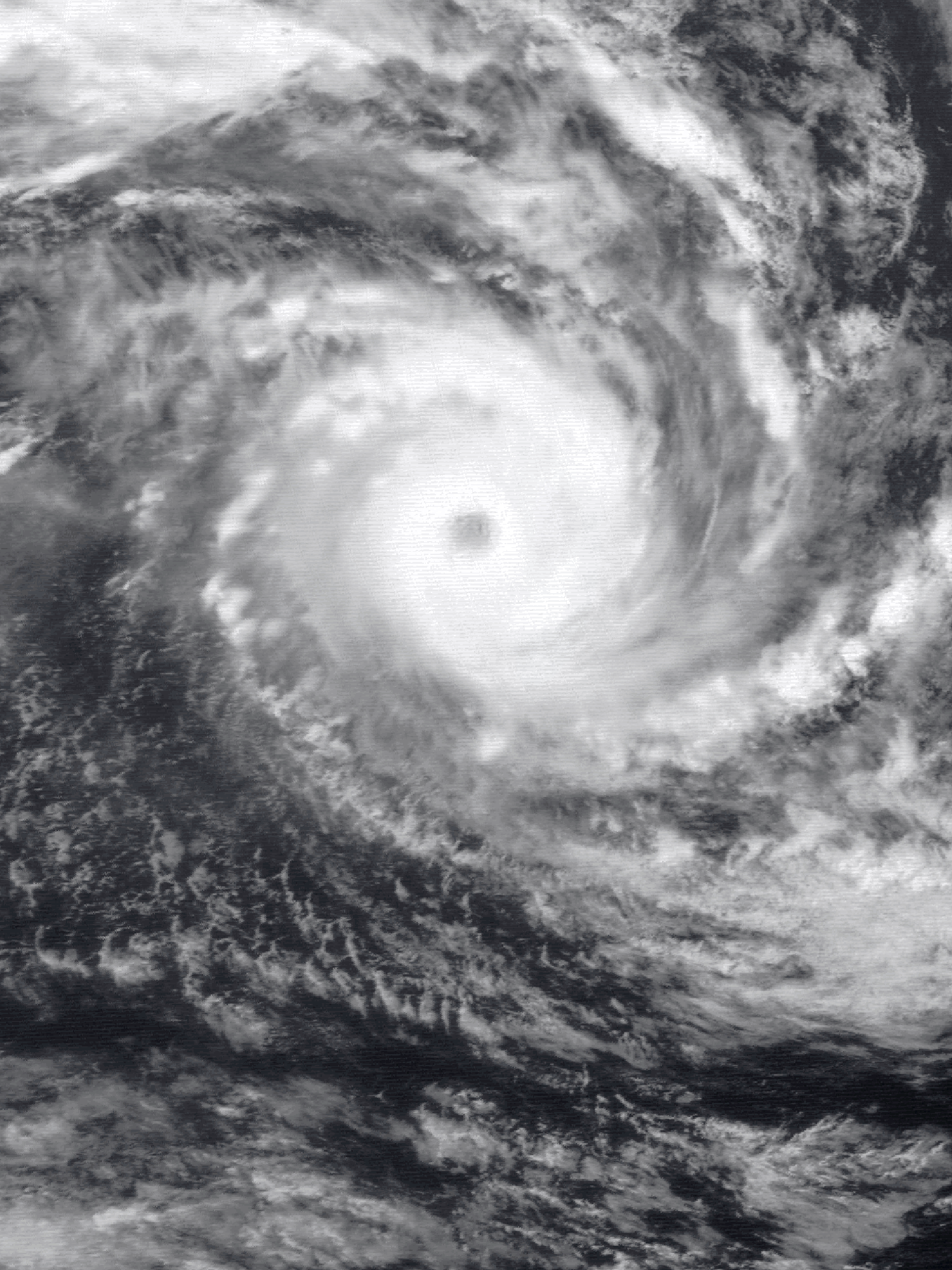
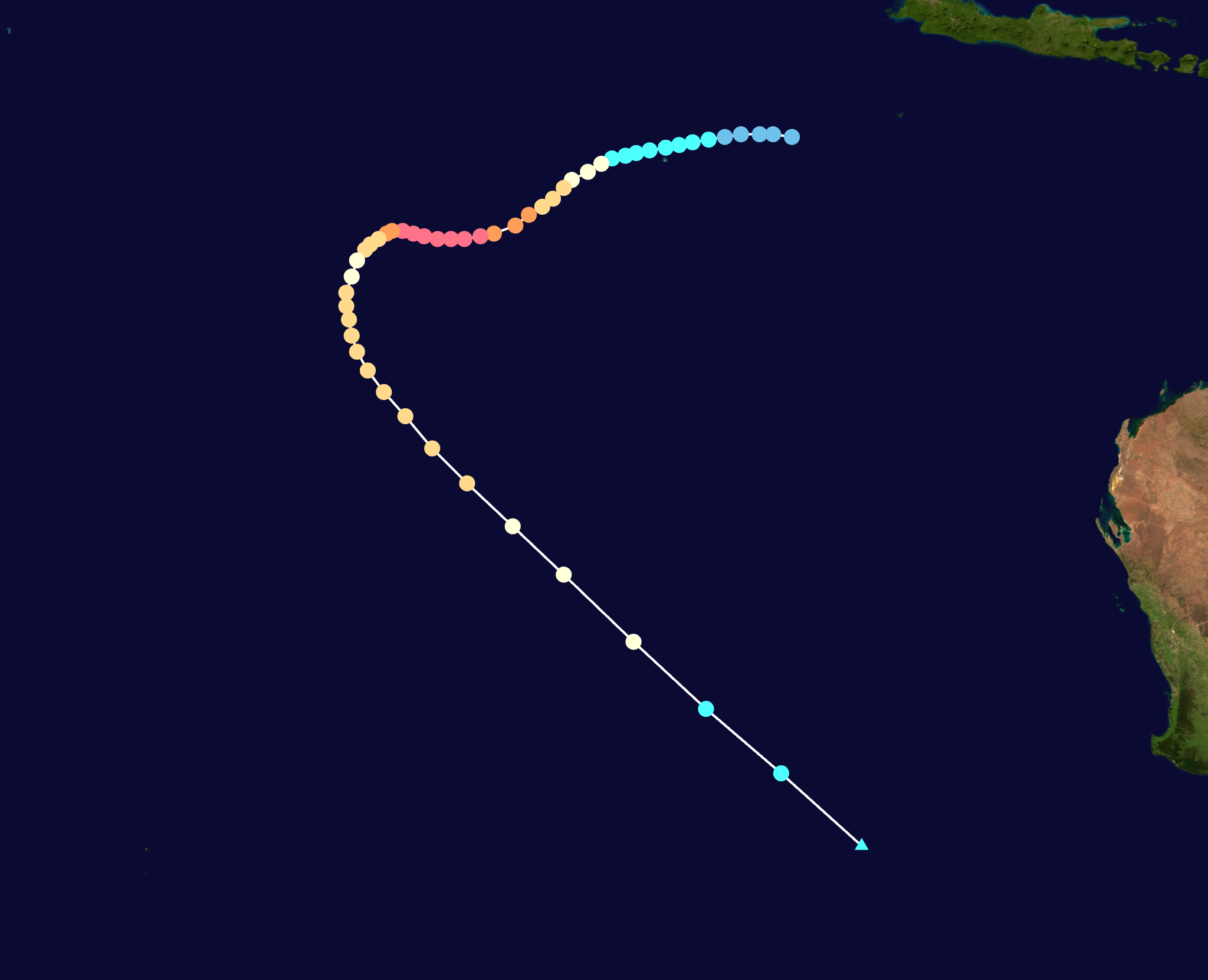
- Duration: 24 February – 8 March
- Peak intensity: 175 km/h (110 mph) (10-min); 930 hPa (mbar)

A low formed on 24 February 550 km (340 mi) east of Cocos Island. The low rapidly intensified under favorable conditions, and at 0600 UTC 25 February, the system was named. Initially, Harriet moved towards the islands, passing just south of North Keeling Island early on 27 February. The storm gradually became better organized, and early on 1 March, Cyclone Harriet attained peak intensity over estimated to have sustained winds of 115 km/h (71 mph) and a central pressure of 930 mbar (27 inHg).

The tropical cyclone weakened somewhat during the following next three days while continuing west. An approaching frontal system from the west resulted in Harriet re-curving to the south on 4 March. The storm continued to weakening due to strong wind shear. Harriet started to accelerate to the southeast on 6 March. The cyclone passed 700 km (430 mi) to the southwest of Cape Leeuwin in southwest Western Australia during the evening of 8 March. Shortly after that, Harriet lost tropical features.

A peak gust of 162 km/h (101 mph) was recorded on Cocos Island, the second strongest on record on the island in the past 40 years. Harriet brought minor property damage on the island, but significant horticultural losses. Overall, damage was assessed at $600,000 (1992 AUD).

=== Severe Tropical Cyclone Ian ===
- Category 4 severe tropical cyclone (Australian scale)
- Category 4 tropical cyclone (SSHWS)
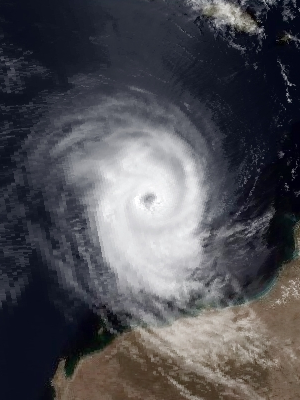
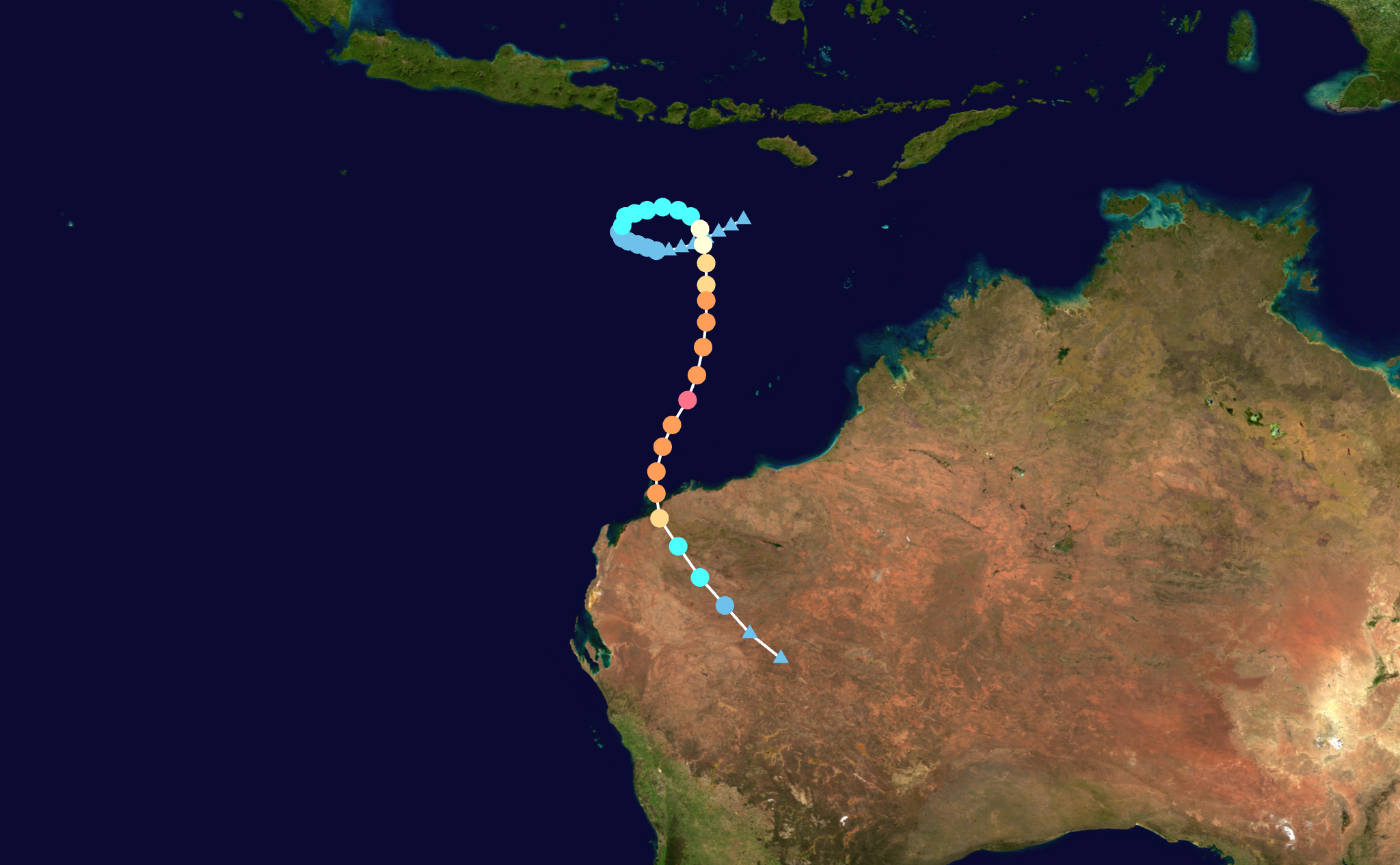
- Duration: 27 February – 4 March
- Peak intensity: 195 km/h (120 mph) (10-min); 930 hPa (mbar)

Another depression developed in the monsoon trough, further east of Harriet-Heather, roughly 300 km (190 mi) due south of Java. Unlike Harriet, this cyclone initially tracked east in response to a high amplitude upper trough located to the west. Under a favorable environment, the system was named Ian later that day. After re-curving to the south, Ian continued to intensify and on 0900 UTC 1 March, Ian bottomed out in intensity with 215 km/h (134 mph) winds. Although Ian began weakening as it approached the Western Australian coast, it was still a severe cyclone as it tracked directly over the Monte Bellos Islands and Barrow Island. Ian subsequently crossed a sparsely populated stretch of coastline approximately 75 km (47 mi) east of Onslow at 2145 UTC 2 March and weakened over land. Ian dissipated the next day.

Upon passing over the Monte Bellos Islands and Barrow Island, gusts to 205 km/h (127 mph) were recorded. Effects from the system were mostly limited to the islands offshore. In the Monte Bellos, a mine was extensively damaged. Due to a 1.6 m (5.2 ft) storm surge, a landing stage on Barrow Island sustained minor damage. On the Australian mainland, damage from the storm was minimal.

=== Severe Tropical Cyclone Esau ===
- Category 4 severe tropical cyclone (Australian scale)
- Category 4 tropical cyclone (SSHWS)
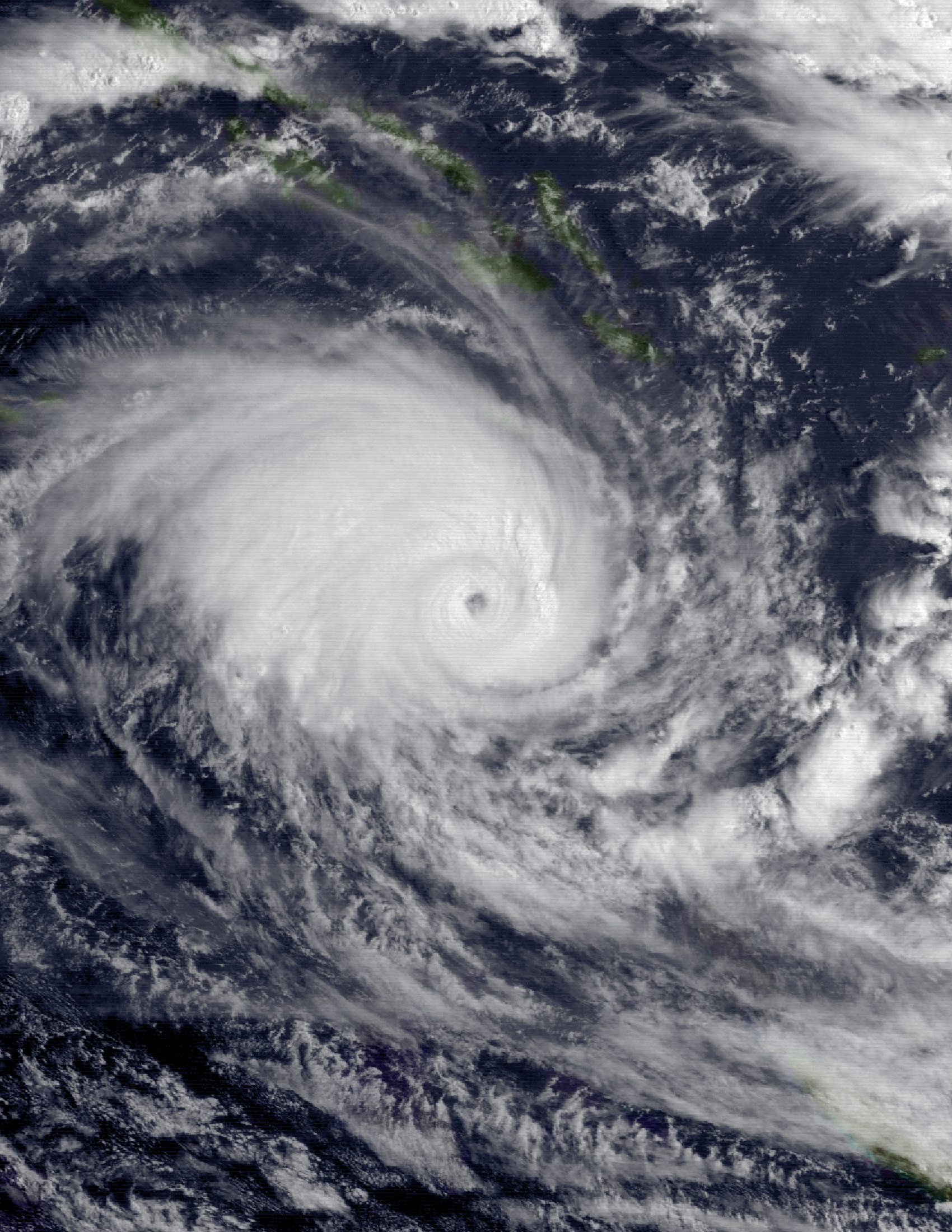
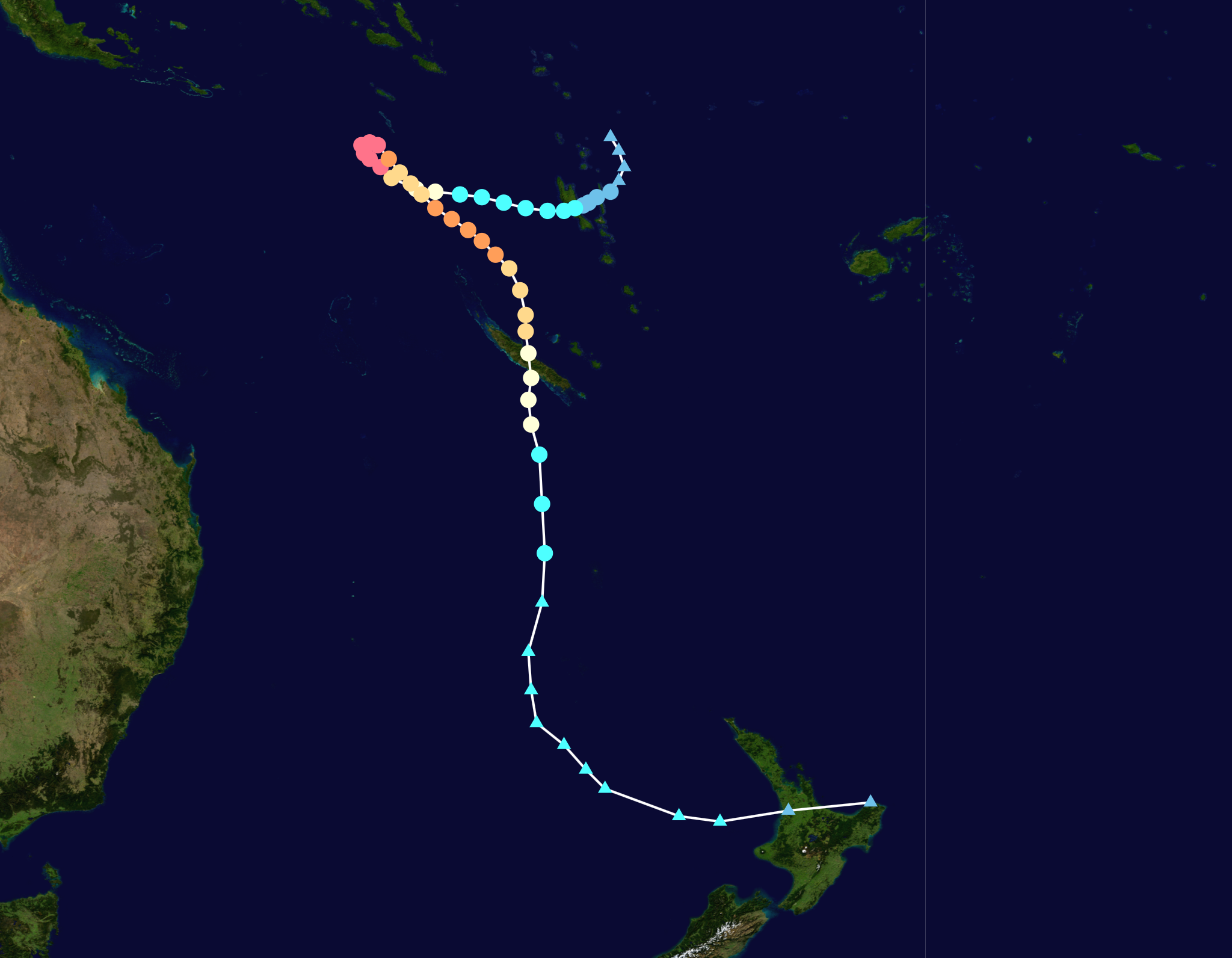
- Duration: 28 February (Entered basin) – 1 March (Exited basin)
- Peak intensity: 185 km/h (115 mph) (10-min); 925 hPa (mbar)

Esau moved into the Australian region and brought gale-force winds to the Solomon Islands during 29 February. In the same time, the JTWC also reported that Esau had peaked with 1-minute sustained wind speeds of 240 km/h (150 mph), which made it equivalent to a category 4 hurricane on the Saffir-Simpson hurricane wind scale. However, Esau moved back into the South Pacific basin and started to weaken the next day.

=== Severe Tropical Cyclone Fran ===
- Category 3 severe tropical cyclone (Australian scale)
- Category 2 tropical cyclone (SSHWS)
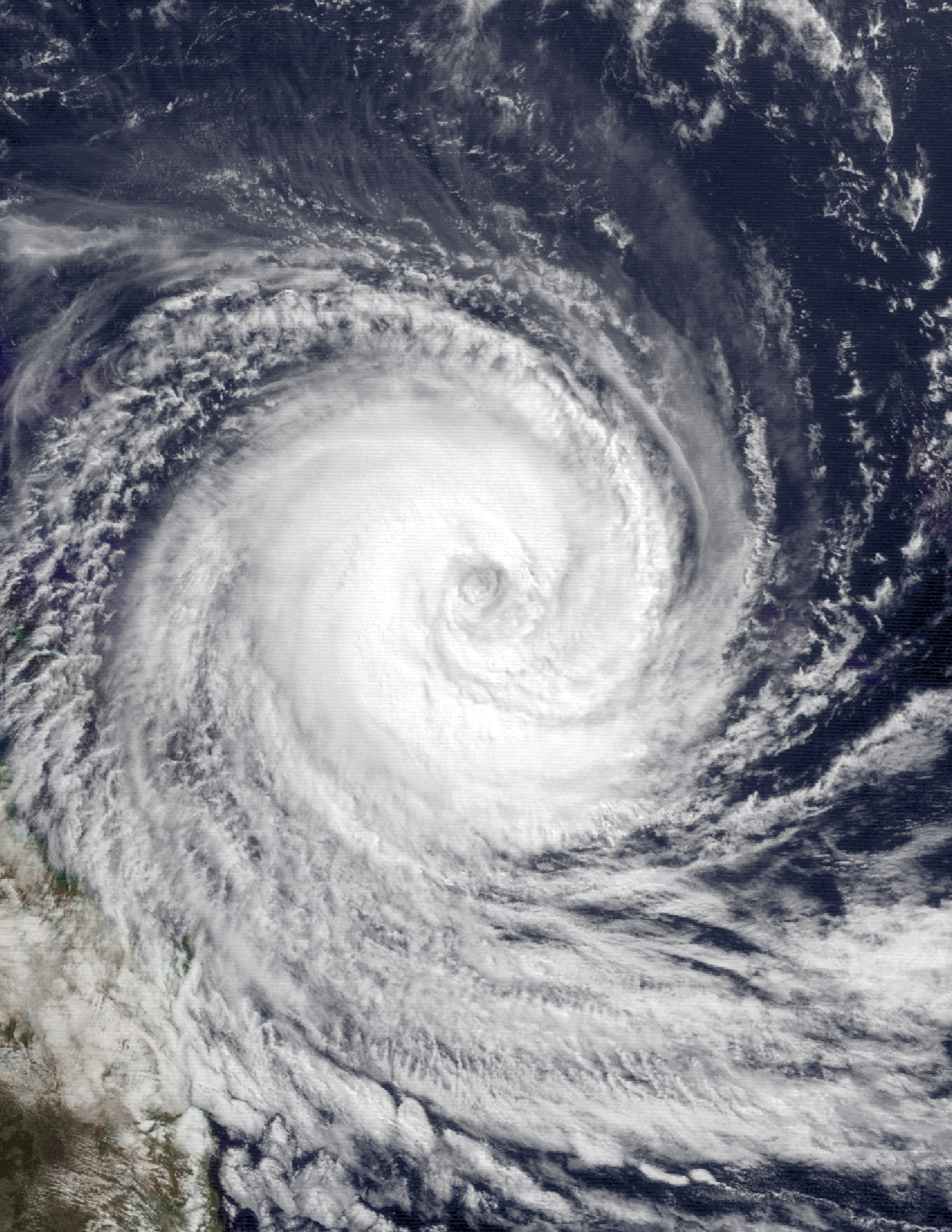
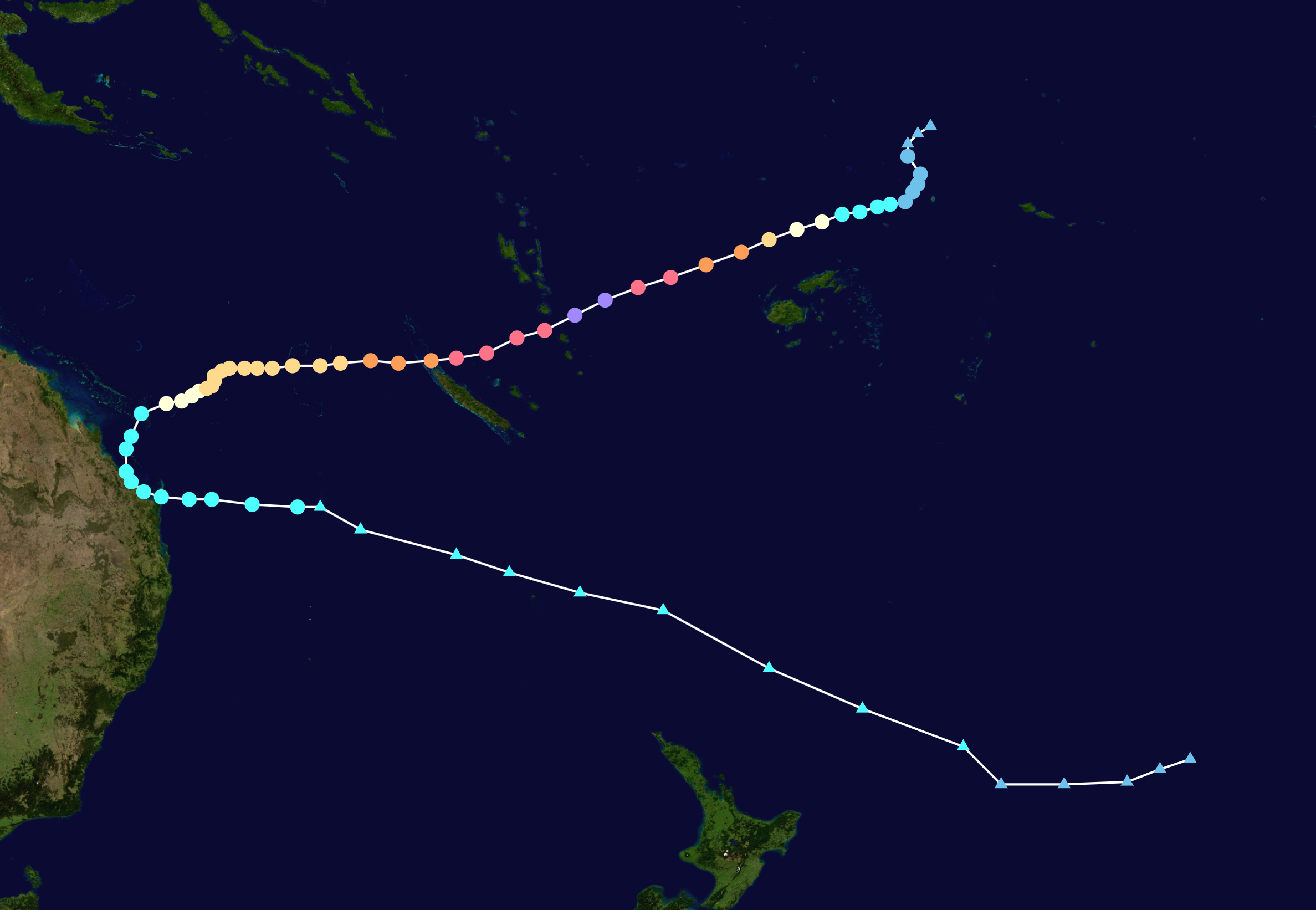
- Duration: 11 March (Entered basin) – 17 March
- Peak intensity: 140 km/h (85 mph) (10-min); 950 hPa (mbar)

Fran moved into the region during 11 March as a Category 3 severe tropical cyclone, and peaked with 10-minute sustained winds of 145 km/h (90 mph). The cyclone had slowed by this stage and it subsequently assumed a somewhat erratic southwest track towards the coast. Over the subsequent next three days, Fran weakened as it became less organized. The cyclone finally crossed the Queensland coast near The Town of 1770 at 1700 UTC 15 March. Fran subsequently moved inland and weakened to a tropical depression before re-curving to the southeast and moving back over water. The remnants of Fran tracked over Norfolk Island before ultimately being merged by a trough north of New Zealand.

In preparation of the storm, officials closed beaches along the Sunshine and Gold Coasts. In addition, train services from Brisbane were cancelled. Across Queensland, coastal towns were flooded, uprooting trees and knocking out power. Several roofs were torn off of homes and some flooding was reported. Winds and flooding caused minor property damage, but considerable crop losses along were reported the coast, with the worst effects in Bundaberg. A total of 40 houses were uproofed throughout Bundaberg. In Burnett Heads, 3 yachts were damaged. Heavy swells caused damage on Heron Island and severe erosion on the Gold and Sunshine Coasts. Overall, 2,624 insurance claims were made because of property damage. Total damage from the system was 8–10 million (1992 AUD), while insurance losses were estimated at $2.5 million (1992 AUD).

=== Severe Tropical Cyclone Neville ===
- Category 5 severe tropical cyclone (Australian scale)
- Category 4 tropical cyclone (SSHWS)
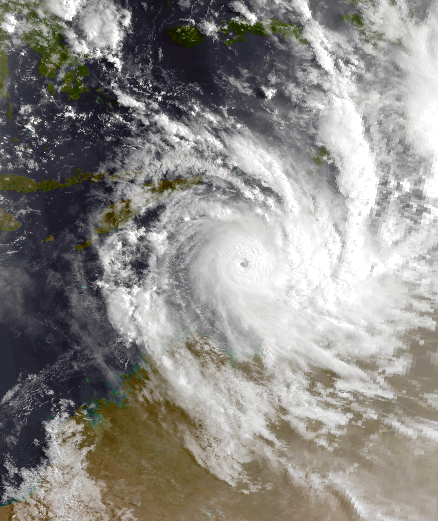
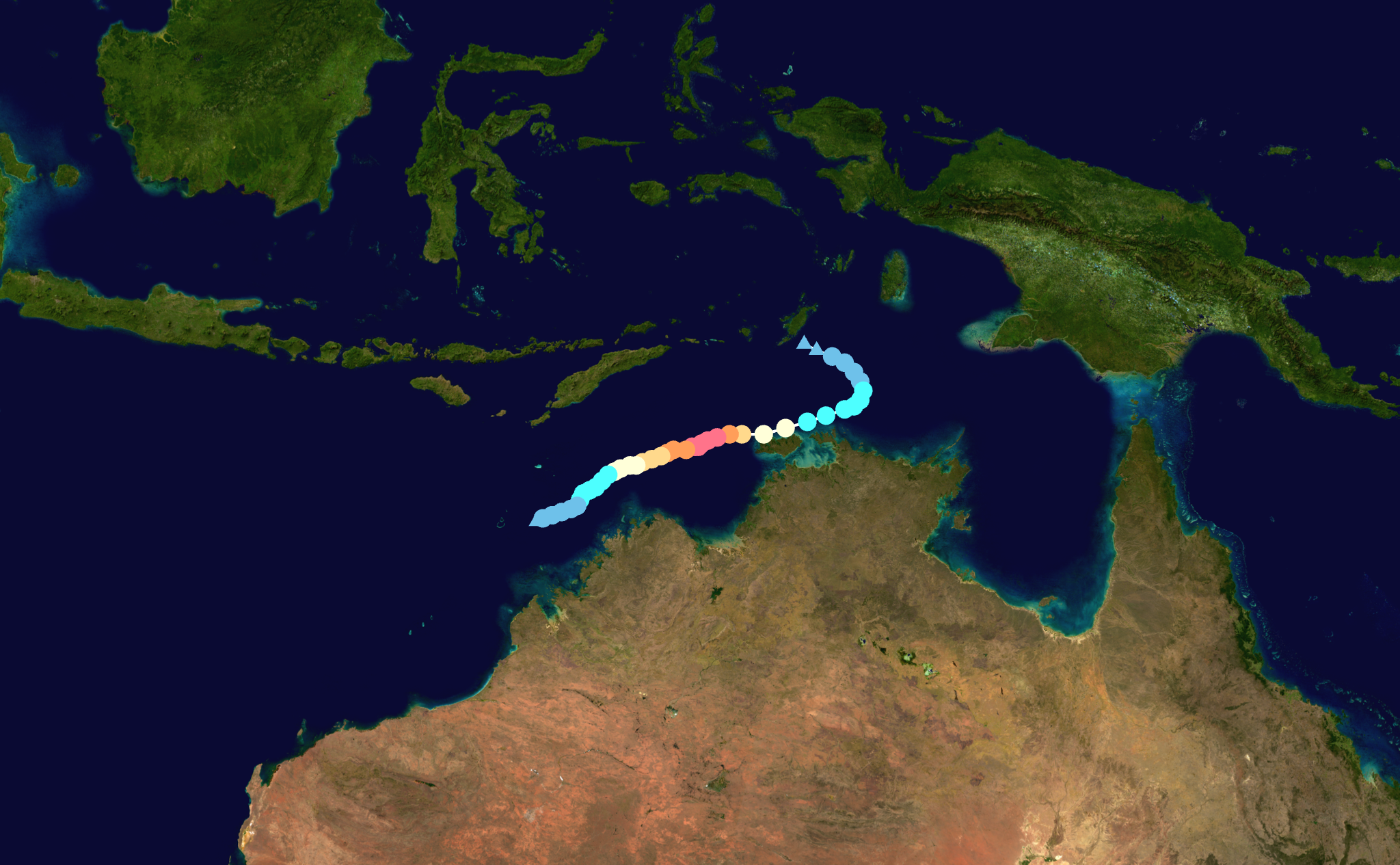
- Duration: 7 April – 13 April
- Peak intensity: 205 km/h (125 mph) (10-min); 945 hPa (mbar)

A major surge of the Madden–Julian oscillation in early April resulting in the development of a tropical depression on 4 April near the Tanimbar Islands. At first, the depression drifted slowly southeast in an environment of low shear. By 0600 UTC 6 April, the circulation was well-defined and south to come under the influence of a deep easterly steering current generated by the subtropical ridge over inland Australia; at 0200 UTC 7 April, the depression re-curved to the southwest and was classified as a tropical cyclone. Despite its close proximity to land, Neville intensified rapidly due to its small size. Roughly 24 hours after being named, the storm attained hurricane-force winds. The cyclone continued deepening as it tracked into the central Timor Sea, reaching its peak intensity of 200 km/h (125 mph) around 1800 UTC 8 April.

Shortly after its peak, Cyclone Neville slowed down response to the passage of a trough. After undergoing a small counterclockwise loop, the system resumed its track to the southwest. It weakened slowly. By 10 April, the eye of the cyclone had collapsed and increased winds shear caused the storm to become less organized. At 0800 UTC 11 April, sustained winds associated with Neville went below hurricane force and the cyclone stalled. Due to a combination of wind shear and cold water, and by 0200 UTC 13 April, Neville had dissipated, though the remnant low-level circulation was apparent for two more days as it drifted away to the southwest.

In preparation of the cyclone on the Tiwi Islands, shipping was delayed and travel by air was cancelled. An oil rig supply boat was forced up on the beach by the winds, and 14 people were airlifted from the BHP rig Challis Venture. When Neville struck the islands only minor damage was reported. A few homes lost their roofs, trees were uprooted and power was knocked out. In addition, 14 people were airlifted when an oil rig was forced up the beach by high winds. Damage on Australia associated with Serve Tropical Cyclone Neville was restricted to the northwestern portion the Northern Territory though widespread tree damage occurred and a camp was destroyed on Melville Island.

=== Severe Tropical Cyclone Jane-Irna ===
- Category 4 severe tropical cyclone (Australian scale)
- Category 2 tropical cyclone (SSHWS)
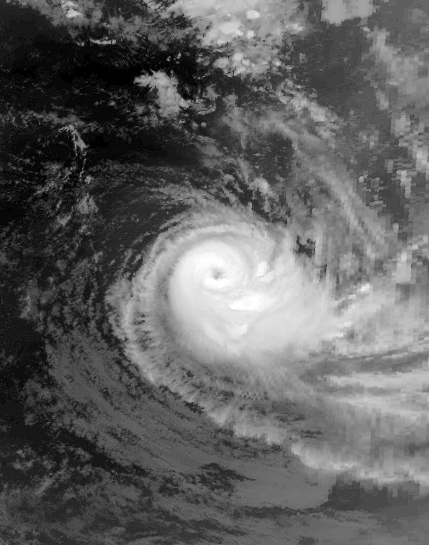
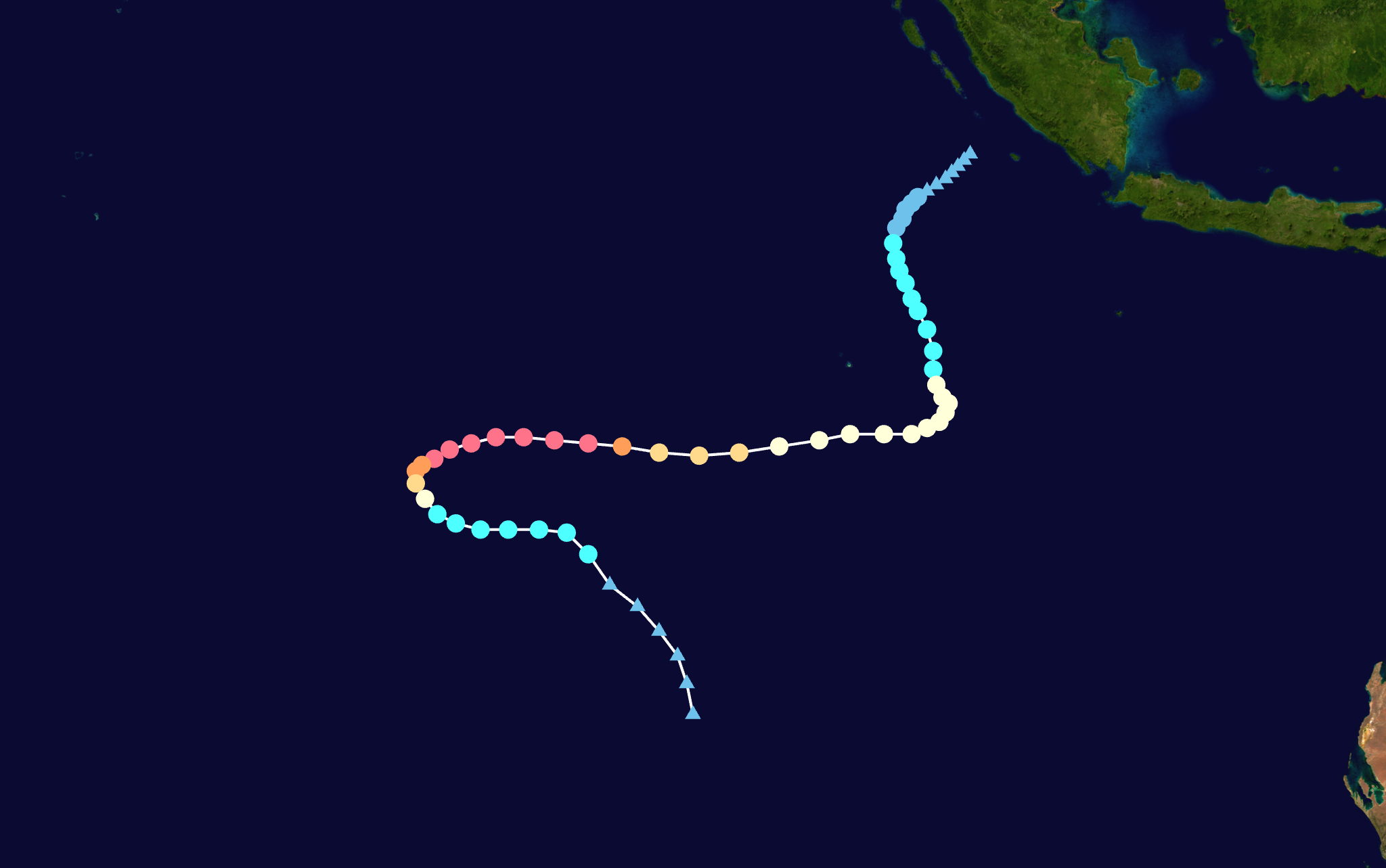
- Duration: 8 April – 17 April
- Peak intensity: 185 km/h (115 mph) (10-min); 930 hPa (mbar)

On 7 April, TCWC Perth started to monitor a tropical low that had developed, within the monsoon trough about 600 km (375 mi) to the northeast of the Cocos Island. Over the next few days the low moved towards the southeast and gradually developed further, before TCWC Perth named it Jane as the low had developed into a category 1 tropical cyclone.

Midday on 10 April Jane made its closest point of approach to Cocos Island, passing 200 km (120 mi) away from the island. As the storm continued to track south, it came under the influence of a deep-layer easterly steering flow caused by the presence of a ridge to the south. Jane turned onto a westward track which it maintained for nearly five days. Cyclone Jane continued to intensify under an ideal environment. On 13 April, a well-defined eye appeared on satellite imagery. A day later, the storm reached its peak intensity of 230 km/h (140 mph), making the storm one of the strongest of the year.

Over the ensuing 24 hours, tropical cyclone Jane began to weaken in response to increased vertical wind shear in association with a mid-latitude trough. By 15 April, the eye had become cloud-filled, and at 0000 UTC 16 April, the cyclone began to re-curve to the southeast and subsequently rapidly deteriorated. By 0100 UTC 17 April, Jane was no longer a tropical cyclone. Due to the storm's small size, winds of just 126 km (78 mi) were reported Cocos Island. Therefore, there were no reports of damage or deaths.

=== Other system ===
During 19 February, TCWC Brisbane and the JTWC started to monitor a tropical low that had developed within the Coral Sea about 670 km (415 mi) to the northeast of Rockhampton in Queensland Australia. During that day, the low gradually developed further as it moved towards the southeast and an anticyclonically curved upper level jet stream, before during the JTWC reported that the low had become equivalent to a tropical storm and assigned it the designation 18P. However, during the next day despite gale-force winds persisting in the systems southern quadrants, the system moved onto the central Queensland coast, before it could become a tropical cyclone. As a result of the low moving inland, the JTWC issued their final advisory on the system later that day, however, the system continued to be monitored until it was absorbed into the Australian inland heat trough.

== Season effects ==
Name	Dates	Peak intensity			Areas affected	Damages (AU$)	Damages (US$)	Deaths
Name	Dates	Category	Wind speed (km/h (mph))	Pressure (hPa)	Areas affected	Damages (AU$)	Damages (US$)	Deaths
Graham	2–10 December	Category 5 Severe tropical cyclone	235 km/h (145 mph)	915 hPa (27.02 inHg)	None	None	None	None
Mark	7–10 January	Category 2 tropical cyclone	100 km/h (60 mph)	980 hPa (28.94 inHg)	Northern Territory, Queensland	3.50	3.60	None
Betsy	10–14 January	Category 3 Severe tropical cyclone	165 km/h (100 mph)	950 hPa (28.05 inHg)	Vanuatu	Unknown	Unknown	2
16S	13–13 January	Tropical depression	45 km/h (30 mph)	1004 hPa (29.65 inHg)	None	None	None	None
Daman	17–19 February	Category 3 Severe tropical cyclone	165 km/h (100 mph)	965 hPa (28.50 inHg)	New South Wales	Unknown	Unknown	None
18P	19–20 February	Tropical low	65 km/h (40 mph)	997 hPa (29.44 inHg)	Queensland	Unknown	Unknown	None
Harriet-Heather	24 February – 8 March	Category 4 Severe Tropical Cyclone	210 km/h (130 mph)	930 hPa (27.46 inHg)	Western Australia	0.06	0.06	None
Ian	27 February – 4 March	Category 5 Severe tropical cyclone	210 km/h (130 mph)	930 hPa (27.46 inHg)	Western Australia	Minimal	Minimal	None
Esau	29 February – 1 March	Category 4 Severe tropical cyclone	185 km/h (115 mph)	925 hPa (27.32 inHg)	Solomon Islands	Unknown	Unknown	None
Fran	11–17 March	Category 3 Severe tropical cyclone	150 km/h (90 mph)	950 hPa (28.05 inHg)	Queensland	10.00	10.28	5
Neville	7–13 April	Category 5 Severe tropical cyclone	205 km/h (130 mph)	945 hPa (27.91 inHg)	Northern Territory, Western Australia	Minor	Minor	None
Jane-Irna	8–13 April	Category 4 Severe tropical cyclone	210 km/h (130 mph)	930 hPa (27.46 inHg)	None	None	None	None
Season aggregates
12	2 December – 13 April		235 km/h (145 mph)	915 hPa (27.02 inHg)		13.94 million	7	

== See also ==
- Tropical cyclones in 1991 and 1992
- 1991–92 South-West Indian Ocean cyclone season
- 1991–92 South Pacific cyclone season
- Atlantic hurricane seasons: 1991, 1992
- Pacific hurricane seasons: 1991, 1992
- Pacific typhoon seasons: 1991, 1992
- North Indian Ocean cyclone seasons: 1991, 1992
