= Ian Ross (journalist) =

English sports journalist

- Born: Ian James Ross; September 25, 1955 (age 71); Leeds, England
- Known for: Journalist

Ian James Ross is a former sports journalist and published author.

He has written for the Southport Visiter, Liverpool Daily Post, Liverpool Echo, The Times, Daily Telegraph and The Guardian.

Ross has also had several books published:

- Everton: A Complete Record
- Howard Kendall's biography Only the Best Is Good Enough (ISBN 978-1851584864)
- Leeds United. The Return to Glory (ISBN 978-1851585083)

In 2001 he vacated his position at The Guardian to join Everton F.C., the club he had been writing about a decade earlier, as Director of Communications.

In 2007 he was appointed as a director of the Everton Community charity, and latterly took up a directorship at the charity's "free school" trust upon its formation in 2011, alongside Robert Elstone.
