= Ian McDougall =

Ian McDougall may refer to:

- Ian McDougall (geologist) (1935–2018), Australian scientist
- Ian McDougall (musician) (1938–2026), Canadian composer, trombonist and academic
- Ian McDougall (producer) (1945–2010), Canadian television producer
- Ian McDougall (footballer) (born 1954), Scottish footballer
- Ian McDougall (architect), Australian architect

== See also ==
- Ian MacDougall (1938–2020), Royal Australian Navy officer
