= Ian Alexander =

Ian Alexander may refer to:

- Ian Alexander (actor) (born 2001), American actor starring in The OA
- Ian Alexander (footballer) (born 1963), Scottish footballer
- Ian Alexander (politician) (born 1947), Australian politician
- Ian Alexander (aviation), Scottish entrepreneur associated with the Rigid Airship Design consortium
