= Ian Scott =

Ian Scott may refer to:

== Arts ==
- Ian James Scott (1914–2010), British painter
- Ian Scott (artist) (1945–2013), New Zealand artist
- Ian Scott (actor) (born 1973), French pornographic actor
- Ian Scott (producer) (born 1975), American record producer

== Politics ==
- Sir Ian Dixon Scott (1909–2002), British civil servant and diplomat
- Ian Scott (Ontario politician) (1934–2006), politician in the Canadian province of Ontario
- Ian Scott (Manitoba politician), Green Party of Canada election candidate in 2004

== Science ==
- A. Ian Scott (1928–2007), Scottish-born American organic chemist
- Ian Scott (Rotarian) (1933–2001), founder of Australian Rotary Health, non-government funder of medical research
- Ian Scott, co-founder of Moltex, developers of the stable salt reactor
- Ian Scott (Canadian businessman), Canadian telecom executive

== Sport ==
- Ian Scott (cyclist) (1915–1980), British silver medal winner at the 1948 Summer Olympics
- Ian Scott (Australian footballer) (born 1940), Australian rules footballer
- Ian Scott (footballer, born 1967), English footballer
- Ian Scott (American football) (born 1981), American football player
- Ian Scott (ice hockey) (born 1999), Canadian ice hockey goaltender

== See also ==
- Scott Ian (born 1963), guitarist of Anthrax
