= List of storms named Ian =

The name Ian has been used for eight tropical cyclones worldwide: two in the Atlantic Ocean, two in the West Pacific Ocean, two in the Australian region, and two in the South Pacific Ocean.

In the Atlantic, where Ian replaced Igor:

- Tropical Storm Ian (2016) – tropical storm in the central Atlantic Ocean that never affected land
- Hurricane Ian (2022) – extremely destructive Category 5 hurricane, made landfall in western Cuba, southwestern Florida, and South Carolina; responsible for over 160 direct and indirect deaths and over $113 billion in damage

The name Ian was retired after the 2022 season and replaced with Idris.

In the West Pacific:

- Typhoon Ian (1987; T8716, 16W) – a Category 3 typhoon that never affected land
- Tropical Storm Ian (1996) (11W) – approached Japan; Japan Meteorological Agency analyzed it as a tropical depression, not as a tropical storm

In the Australian region:

- Cyclone Ian (1982) – moved erratically off the coast of Western Australia before making landfall
- Cyclone Ian (1992) – impacted Western Australia

In the South Pacific:

- Cyclone Ian (1997) – remained over open waters
- Cyclone Ian (2014) – impacted Tonga

== See also ==
- Tropical Storm Iman (2021) – a South-West Indian Ocean tropical cyclone with a similar name
