= Ian Davidson =

Ian Davidson may refer to:

- Ian Davidson (footballer, born 1947), English footballer
- Ian Davidson (footballer, born 1937), Scottish footballer
- Ian Davidson (British politician) (born 1950), former Scottish Labour Co-operative MP
- Ian Davidson (South African politician) (born 1951), South African Democratic Alliance MP
- Ian Davidson (scriptwriter) (1940–2024), British comedy scriptwriter
- Ian Davidson (cricketer) (born 1964), English cricketer
- Ian Damon (Ian Davidson, born 1935), Australian broadcaster and disc jockey
- Ian Davidson (rugby union) (1877–1939), Irish rugby player

== See also ==
- Ian Davison (disambiguation)
