= Ian Martin =

Ian Martin may refer to:

- Ian Martin (UN official) (born 1946), English human rights activist and United Nations official
- Ian Martin (writer) (born 1953), British comedy writer
- Ian Martin (rugby league) (1951–2026), Australian rugby league footballer
- Ian Kennedy Martin (1936–2026), British television scriptwriter
- Ian Martin (actor) (1912–1981), American actor and writer

== See also ==
- Iain Martin (born 1971), British political journalist
