= Ian Berry =

Ian Berry may refer to:

- Ian Berry (photojournalist) (1934–2026), British photojournalist in South Africa
- Ian Berry (politician) (born 1951), Australian Liberal National politician
- Ian Berry (artist) (born 1984), British artist
