= Ian Watson (cricketer) =

English cricketer

Personal information
- Full name: Ian Ronald Watson
- Born: 9 June 1947 (age 79); Teddington, Middlesex, England
- Batting: Right-handed

Domestic team information
- Years: Team
- 1969: Middlesex
- 1971: Northamptonshire
- 1973: Hampshire

Career statistics
Competition	First-class
Matches	3
Runs scored	37
Batting average	9.25
100s/50s	–/–
Top score	16
Catches/stumpings	3/–
- Source: Cricinfo, 17 April 2023

Ian Ronald Watson (born 9 June 1947) is an English former first-class cricketer.

Watson was born at Teddington in June 1947. His brief foray into county cricket is considered an unusual one. He was on both the Middlesex and Marylebone Cricket Club staff in the late 1960s, with Watson making a single appearance in first-class cricket for Middlesex against Oxford University at Oxford in 1969. Two years later, he made a single first-class appearance for Northamptonshire against Oxford University, before making a third and final appearance in first-class cricket for Hampshire against the touring West Indians at Southampton in 1973. In his final match, he opened the batting alongside Gordon Greenidge, making scores of 5 and 1. More recently, he was associated with Hursley Park Cricket Club in both a playing and administrative role, having played for the club in the Southern Cricket League until 2015.
