= Ian Wallace (photographer) =

Australian photographer

Ian Wallace (born 1972 in the Isle of Man (UK)) is a Tasmanian landscape photographer.

He emigrated to Melbourne (Australia) in 1985. From there he moved to Hobart, Tasmania in 2003. In 2004, he self-published his first book Tasmania: Portrait of an island. The sequel, Tasmania: Adventures on an island, features a number of wilderness experiences in places such as the Franklin River, the Walls of Jerusalem National Park, the Tasman Peninsula and the secluded beauty of Southwest National Park.

His photographs are exhibited in his gallery in the historic town of Richmond and at various galleries – including the wilderness gallery at Cradle Mountain, Tasmania.

In 2008, Ian Wallace was awarded the Epson Tasmanian Professional Photographer of the year award by the Tasmanian division of the Australian Institute of Professional Photographers (AIPP)

== Books by Wallace ==
- Tasmania: Portrait of an island. Rosny Park, Tas.: Ian Wallace, 2004. ISBN 0-9752454-0-6.
- Tasmania: Adventures on an island. Rosny Park, Tas.: Ian Wallace, 2006. ISBN 0-9752454-1-4.

== Awards ==
- 2008 AIPP Australian Institute of Professional Photography – Tasmanian Awards – Epson Tasmanian Professional Photographer of the Year, 3 Silver, 1 Gold
- 2008 AIPP Australian Institute of Professional Photography – National Awards – 1 Silver with Distinction, 2 Silver
- 2007 AIPP Australian Institute of Professional Photography – Tasmanian Awards – Runner up Epson Tasmanian Professional Photographer of the Year, 4 Silver
- Australian Institute of Professional Photography – Tasmanian Division – Awards Page
