= Ian Patterson =

Ian (or Iain) Patterson (or Paterson) may refer to:

- Ian Patterson (footballer), English footballer
- Ian Hunter (singer) (born 1939), of Mott the Hoople, full name Ian Hunter Patterson
- Ian Patterson (poet) (born 1948), British poet, translator and academic
- Ian Paterson, breast surgeon jailed for unnecessary operations in England
- Iain Paterson (born 1973), Scottish opera singer
