= Ian Morris (cricketer) =

Welsh cricketer (born 1946)

Ian Morris (born 27 June 1946 in Maesteg) is a Welsh former cricketer active from 1966 to 1968 who played for Glamorgan. He appeared in 14 first-class matches as a right-handed batsman who bowled slow left-arm orthodox spin. He scored 253 runs with a highest score of 38 (against Hampshire 1966), took four wickets with a best performance of two for 30, and took 15 catches.
