= Ian Weatherhead =

English watercolour artist

- Born: 1932 (age 93–94); London, United Kingdom
- Known for: Painting
- Awards: Catto Gallery Award (Royal Watercolour Society)
- Patrons: House of Commons of the United Kingdom

Ian Weatherhead (born 1932) is an English watercolour artist.

Weatherhead was born in Leeds, Yorkshire. He attended schools in Yorkshire and Scotland, including Fettes College. In Edinburgh, he was a pupil of William Wilson ARSA (1905–1972), a stained glass artist, printmaker and watercolourist who strongly influenced his style. He studied architecture at the University of London.

He started as an architect before becoming a professional painter. As well as Wilson, his pictures are also influenced by John Piper and Raoul Dufy. He paints landscape scenes mostly in Britain, but also in continental Europe, such as France and Italy.

Weatherhead exhibits in London and elsewhere. He has regularly painted scenes of the Henley Royal Regatta that have been exhibited each July in the Stewards' Enclosure during the regatta. As well as original watercolours, he also produces limited edition prints.

In 1991, Weatherhead received the Catto Gallery Award at the Royal Watercolour Society. His work can be found in the House of Commons collection.

For many years, Ian Weatherhead lived in Cheltenham, before moving to Somerset.
