= Iain Collings =

Electrical engineer

Iain Collings is an Australian electrical engineer. He worked at the Commonwealth Scientific and Industrial Research Organisation (CSIRO) and was named Fellow of the Institute of Electrical and Electronics Engineers (IEEE) in 2015 for contributions to multiple user and multiple antenna wireless communication systems.

Collings was born in Melbourne, Australia. He achieved his Bachelor of Engineering (B.E) degree in 1992 and Doctor of Philosophy degree in 1995 from University of Melbourne and Australian National University respectively.
