= Ian Wood =

Ian Wood may refer to:

- Sir Ian Wood (businessman) (1942–2026), chairman of the Wood Group, a British engineering business
- Ian Wood (politician) (1901–1992), Australian politician
- Ian Wood (footballer, born 1948), English footballer for Oldham Athletic and San Jose Earthquakes
- Ian Wood (footballer, born 1958), English footballer for Aldershot and Mansfield Town
- Ian N. Wood (born 1950), British historian
- Ian Wood, the perpetrator of the Ughill Hall shootings
