= Ian Robinson =

Ian Robinson may refer to:

- Ian Robinson (Australian football umpire) (born 1946), Victorian Football League umpire active in the 1970s and 1980s
- Ian Robinson (Australian politician) (1925–2017), Australian MP
- Ian Robinson (author) (1937–2020), British literary critic
- Ian Robinson (cricket umpire) (1947–2016), Zimbabwean cricket umpire active from 1992 to 2004
- Ian Robinson (publisher) (1934–2004), writer, artist and editor of Oasis Books
- Ian Robinson (rationalist) (born 1940), president of the Rationalist Society of Australia
- Ian Robinson (squash player) (born 1952), former English professional squash player
- Ian Robinson (rugby league), rugby league footballer of the 1970s, and 1980s
- Ian Robinson (rugby union) (1944–2014), Welsh rugby union player
- Ian Robinson (footballer), English footballer
- Ian Robinson, member of Black Lace
