= Iain Priestley =

English cricketer (born 1967)

Iain Martin Priestley (born 25 September 1967 in Horsforth, Leeds, Yorkshire, England) is an English first-class cricketer, who played two matches for Yorkshire County Cricket Club in 1989. He also played for the Yorkshire Second XI from 1986 to 1990.

A right arm medium fast bowler, Priestley took 4 for 27 on his first-class debut against Nottinghamshire in May at Headingley, but did not score a run as Yorkshire lost by an innings in two days. He took 0 for 73 against Northamptonshire a couple of weeks later, and scored 2 and 23 batting at number eleven as Yorkshire went beaten by six wickets. Despite this bright start, Priestley was unable to force his way back into the side because of major injuries.

He later played for Pudsey St Lawrence Cricket Club.
