= Ian Davison (footballer) =

Australian rules footballer

Personal information
- Born: 12 January 1945
- Original team: Commercial Bank
- Height: 180 cm (5 ft 11 in)
- Weight: 72 kg (159 lb)
- Position: Wing

Playing career^{1}
Years	Club	Games (Goals)
1965–69	South Melbourne	55 (29)
- ^{1} Playing statistics correct to the end of 1969.

Ian Davison (born 12 January 1945) is a former Australian rules footballer who played with South Melbourne in the Victorian Football League (VFL).
