= Ian Morton =

English cricketer (born 1970)

Personal information
- Full name: Ian Stuart Morton
- Born: 14 October 1970 (age 56); Clacton-on-Sea, Essex, England
- Batting: Right-handed
- Bowling: Right-arm medium-fast

Domestic team information
- Years: Team
- 2002–2005: Suffolk

Career statistics
Competition	List A
Matches	3
Runs scored	98
Batting average	49.00
100s/50s	–/–
Top score	42*
Balls bowled	–
Wickets	–
Bowling average	–
5 wickets in innings	–
10 wickets in match	–
Best bowling	–
Catches/stumpings	2/–
- Source: Cricinfo, 28 July 2011

Ian Stuart Morton (born 14 October 1970) is a former English cricketer. Morton was a right-handed batsman who bowled right-arm medium-fast. He was born in Clacton-on-Sea, Essex.

Morton made his debut for Suffolk in the 2002 Minor Counties Championship against Cumberland. Morton played Minor counties cricket for Suffolk from 2002 to 2005, making 14 Minor Counties Championship and 8 MCCA Knockout Trophy. He made his List A debut against Buckinghamshire in the 1st round of the 2003 Cheltenham & Gloucester Trophy, which was played in 2002. He made 2 further List A appearances, against Devon in the 1st round of the 2004 Cheltenham & Gloucester Trophy which was played in 2003, and Glamorgan in the 1st round of the 2005 Cheltenham & Gloucester Trophy. In his 3 List A matches, he scored 98 runs at an average of 49.00, with a high score of 42 not out. With the ball, he bowled a total of 9 wicket-less overs.
