= Ian Erix =

- Born: Long Island, New York, United States
- Occupations: Singer, Songwriter, TV Presenter
- Years active: 2006–present
- Labels: Transcontinental Records, Warner/Chappell, Universal Music Germany, Ultra Music, Sony Music Entertainment, Nordican Music Group, Misfit Mindz Entertainment
- Website: www.ianerix.com

Ian Erix is an American pop singer, songwriter, TV presenter and activist. In 2013, he was signed to Ultra Music and Sony Entertainment.

== Early life ==
Erix was raised on Long Island, New York. He began performing professionally as a DJ/Emcee at age nine and signed his first management and recording contract as a pop singer at the age of 14 with Louis J. Pearlman, the boyband mogul behind Orlando based Transcontinental Records.

== Career ==
After Pearlman's arrest for embezzlement etc., Erix signed a record deal with I.D Music in Denmark and Warner/Chappell Music Scandinavia. His first album was "For Conformity".

In 2010, Erix entered into a deal with Universal Music Group in Germany but his album release was held up for years when the record company began restructuring and his former A&R and manager, Nik Hafemann, left the label. During this time, Erix released "So Scene, So See Through (A Song For Mutts)" which inspired the name of his fandom the- "Mutt Army". Ian was invited to perform the song on MTV UK in a special live session.

In 2014, Ian recorded "Shangri-la" (also known as "Rannalle"), a song he wrote with Finnish boy band TCT and producer Erik Nyholm. The Scandinavian version of the song was awarded as the "Best Song of the Summer" in 2014 by radio station The Voice. The track climbed to the top of the single charts for several consecutive weeks reaching number 3 on national radio charts. Overall, the song was the fourth most played radio song in Finland in 2014 and on 24 July 2014, it was announced to have sold enough copies to be awarded gold record status.

In 2015, Erix released the English language version of "Shangri-La".The Guardian, one of the UK's largest newspapers, heavily criticized the music-video.

In 2016, Erix released an EP called "Graffiti On My Heart" along with a 4 part music video film based on his personal life experiences including rising above child abuse, the alleged homicide of his grandfather and death of his dad, etc.>

In 2017, Erix's single, "Footprints In The Sand", an EDM based pop track, peaked at #5 during the week of August 25 on dance radio in Japan. In that same year, Erix appeared in Mumbai, India where he hosted/performed for an MTV pre-show at Justin Bieber's "Purpose Tour" and later in the UAE he appeared in a pre-show from the Katy Perry New Year's Eve 2018 concert.

In March 2018, Erix went to Parkland, Florida to record a benefit song with survivors of the school massacre at Marjory Stoneman Douglas High School. All profits from sales of the song called "Raise Some Hell", which was written by Erix and features background vocals and soundbites from Stoneman Douglas Survivors, will go to victims’ families, survivors, and non-profit groups supporting social justice initiatives.
