= Ian D. Reid =

Computer scientist

- Education: University of Western Australia (BSc); University of Oxford (DPhil)
- Known for: Visual SLAM, active vision, visual geometry
- Awards: Rhodes Scholarship (1988); ARC Australian Laureate Fellowship (2013–2018); Fellow, Australian Academy of Science (2021); Fellow, Australian Academy of Technological Sciences and Engineering
- Scientific career
- Fields: Computer vision, robotics, machine learning
- Workplaces: Mohamed bin Zayed University of Artificial Intelligence; University of Adelaide; University of Oxford

Ian D. Reid is a computer scientist whose research is in computer vision and robotics, with particular contributions to visual simultaneous localisation and mapping (SLAM), active vision, and the use of machine learning for visual perception. He is a Professor and Department Chair of Computer Vision at the Mohamed bin Zayed University of Artificial Intelligence (MBZUAI) in Abu Dhabi. He was previously Professor of Computer Science and Head of the School of Computer Science at the University of Adelaide, and earlier Professor of Engineering Science at the University of Oxford. Reid is a Fellow of the Australian Academy of Science and of the Australian Academy of Technological Sciences and Engineering.

== Education ==
Reid completed a Bachelor of Science in computer science and mathematics with first-class honours at the University of Western Australia in 1987. He was awarded a Rhodes Scholarship for Western Australia in 1988 and undertook doctoral study at the University of Oxford, where he completed a DPhil in 1992.

== Career ==
After completing his doctorate, Reid held a succession of research and academic positions at Oxford, eventually becoming a Professor of Engineering Science and a Fellow of Exeter College. With his long-time collaborator David Murray he led the Active Vision Group within the university's Robotics Research Group.

In 2012 he moved to the University of Adelaide, where he became Professor of Computer Science and Head of the School of Computer Science and a leading member of the Australian Institute for Machine Learning. From 2014 to 2021 he served as Deputy Director of the Australian Research Council Centre of Excellence in Robotic Vision (the Australian Centre for Robotic Vision).

In 2023 Reid joined the Mohamed bin Zayed University of Artificial Intelligence as Professor and Department Chair of Computer Vision.

== Research ==
Reid's research spans computer vision and robotics over more than three decades, including active vision, visual geometry, visual tracking, human motion capture, visual surveillance, and simultaneous localisation and mapping. He is a co-author of MonoSLAM, an early real-time single-camera SLAM system, and of a widely cited survey on the past, present and future of SLAM. His later work includes contributions to semantic segmentation and to object-detection metrics, and more recently focuses on spatial and embodied artificial intelligence for robotic perception and decision-making.

According to Google Scholar, Reid's publications have been cited approximately 80,000 times, with an h-index of 110.

== Awards and honours ==
- Rhodes Scholarship for Western Australia (1988)
- Australian Research Council Australian Laureate Fellowship (2013–2018)
- Fellow, Australian Academy of Technological Sciences and Engineering
- Fellow, Australian Academy of Science (2021)
- Australian Computer Society Artificial Intelligence Distinguished Researcher Award (2022)

== Selected publications ==
- Davison, A. J.; Reid, I. D.; Molton, N. D.; Stasse, O. (2007). "MonoSLAM: Real-Time Single Camera SLAM". IEEE Transactions on Pattern Analysis and Machine Intelligence. 29 (6): 1052–1067.
- Cadena, C.; Carlone, L.; Carrillo, H.; Latif, Y.; Scaramuzza, D.; Neira, J.; Reid, I.; Leonard, J. J. (2016). "Past, Present, and Future of Simultaneous Localization and Mapping: Toward the Robust-Perception Age". IEEE Transactions on Robotics. 32 (6): 1309–1332.
- Lin, G.; Milan, A.; Shen, C.; Reid, I. (2017). "RefineNet: Multi-Path Refinement Networks for High-Resolution Semantic Segmentation". Proceedings of the IEEE Conference on Computer Vision and Pattern Recognition.
- Rezatofighi, H.; Tsoi, N.; Gwak, J.; Sadeghian, A.; Reid, I.; Savarese, S. (2019). "Generalized Intersection over Union: A Metric and a Loss for Bounding Box Regression". Proceedings of the IEEE/CVF Conference on Computer Vision and Pattern Recognition.
