= Stewart (name) =

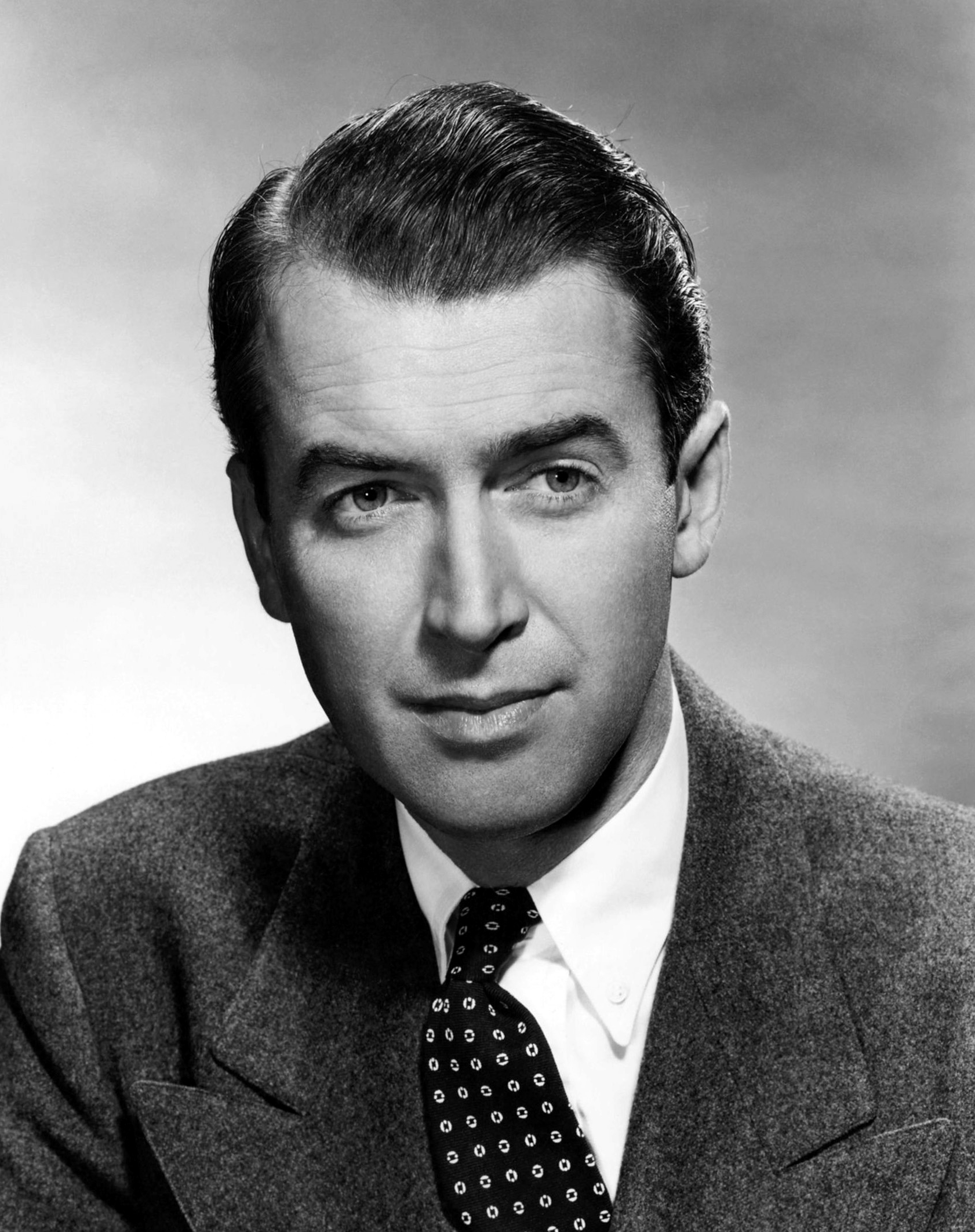
- Actor James Stewart

Origin
- Meaning: "steward"
- Region of origin: Scotland, England

Other names
- Variant forms: Stuart, Steward, Steuart, Sievert, Steiert, Steuer, Steuert, Stewert, Siewert, Schweigert or Zweigert

Stewart
- Gender: Masculine

Other names
- Related names: Stuart, Steward

Stewart is a Scottish and English surname, also used as a given name. It is derived from the old English word "stigweard", a compound of "stig" meaning household, and "weard", a guardian (ward), of which the modern form is steward or from the Gaelic Stiùbhart meaning steward. Alternative spellings are Stuart, Steward and Steuart. The surname Stewart has large concentrations in the United States (mainly in the Deep South, and the other southern states), United Kingdom (mainly in Scotland, Northern Ireland, North East England, South West England, Cumbria, Lancashire, and Yorkshire), Canada, Jamaica, New Zealand, Australia and elsewhere that has large Scottish or Ulster Scots diaspora. In 2014, Stewart was the 66th-most common surname in the United Kingdom.

In Britain, the early uses are as occupational names (like, for example, Smith) for stewards, those responsible for managing a great household or estate. The French form of the name, Stuart was brought to Scotland from France by Mary Stuart, in the 16th century.

The use as a first name probably began as a gesture by parents of their loyalty or affiliation to the House of Stuart, a very common origin for first names in Early modern Britain, as with Percy, Howard, Gordon and many others.

One early progenitor of Stewart families was Alan fitz Flaad, a Breton knight who settled in England after the Norman Conquest. His son, Walter fitz Alan, relocated to Scotland during the Anarchy and became the High Steward of Scotland, hence the origin of the surname.

== House of Stewart ==
One of the hereditary Stewart stewards, Walter Stewart, married Marjorie Bruce, daughter of King Robert I, and founded the royal House of Stewart, beginning with their son King Robert II. The House of Stewart was the longest serving royal dynasty of Scotland. Mary, Queen of Scots formalised the use of the spelling Stuart, while resident in France, in order to preserve the correct pronunciation. In 1603, the Stewart King James VI of Scotland became King James I of England and Wales by his succession to Queen Elizabeth I. The Stewart dynasty ruled Scotland, England and Wales (with an interruption during Cromwell's Commonwealth after the English Civil War) until 1714, when Queen Anne died and the British Crown passed to the German Electors of Hanover.

The grandson of James II, Prince Charles Edward Stuart, led the last attempt to restore the Stewart dynasty to the British Crown in 1745-6 and became known to history as "Bonnie Prince Charlie". This attempted coup d'état ended in the slaughter of Charles' army at the Battle of Culloden in April, 1746.

== Stewart peers ==
In addition to the Royal House of Stuart, various branches of the Stewart family became Scottish peers, at various times holding the Marquisate of Bute, the earldoms of Atholl, Mar, Moray, Angus, Galloway, as well as several Lordships of Parliament. Several families of Stewarts became Highland clans in their own right, including the Stewarts of Appin.

== Diaspora ==
Many Stewart emigrants from the lowlands of Scotland settled in the Irish province of Ulster in the seventeenth century. Stewarts also emigrated from other parts of Scotland and settled throughout the rest of Ireland.

== People named Stewart ==
=== Surname ===
- Adam Stewart (disambiguation), multiple people
- Al Stewart (born 1945), Scottish singer-songwriter
- Alana Stewart (born 1945), American actress, former wife of Rod Stewart
- Alastair Stewart (born 1952), British journalist and broadcaster
- Alec Stewart (born 1963), British cricketer, kept wicket for England
- Alexander P. Stewart (1821–1908), American general and professor
- Alexander William Stewart (1865–1933), Scottish naval architect, engineer and inventor
- Alexis Stewart (born 1965), American talk radio host, daughter of Martha Stewart
- Alice Stewart (1906–2002), British physician and epidemiologist
- Alice Stewart (commentator) (1966–2024), American political commentator
- Alison Stewart (born 1966), American journalist
- Alva Stewart, American politician
- Amanda Stewart (born 1959), Australian artist
- Amar Stewart, British painter
- Amy Stewart (disambiguation), multiple people
- Andy Stewart (disambiguation), multiple people
- Anthony Stewart (disambiguation), multiple people
- April Stewart (born 1969), American actress
- ArDarius Stewart (born 1993), American football player
- Ava Stewart, Canadian artistic gymnast
- Belle Stewart (1906–1997), Scottish singer
- Bob Stewart (disambiguation), multiple people
- Booboo Stewart (born 1994), American singer of T-Squad and actor
- Breanna Stewart (born 1994), American basketball player
- Brent Stewart, Manitoba judge
- Brett Stewart (born 1985), Australian rugby league footballer
- Brian Stewart (disambiguation), multiple people
- Britt Stewart (born 1989), American professional dancer
- Brock Stewart (born 1991), American baseball player
- Bryan Stewart (born 1985), English footballer
- Bryanne Stewart (born 1979), Australian tennis player
- Cal Stewart, American comedian
- Calvin Stewart (born 1946), Jamaican footballer
- Calum Stewart (born 1982), Scottish musician
- Cam Stewart (disambiguation), multiple people
- Cameron Stewart (born 1975), Canadian comic book creator
- Cameron Stewart (born 1991), English footballer
- Cameron Stewart, Australian journalist
- Camille Stewart, American cybersecurity attorney
- Candice Stewart, American TV personality and beauty pageant winner
- Carl Stewart (disambiguation), multiple people
- Carolyn L. Stewart (married name Mazloomi; born 1948), African-American curator, quilter, author, art historian, and aerospace engineer
- Catherine Mary Stewart, Canadian actress
- Cathy Stewart, French actress
- Charles Stewart (disambiguation), multiple people
- Charlotte Stewart, American film and television actress
- Corbet Page Stewart (1896–1962), Scottish biochemist
- Corey Stewart (disambiguation), multiple people
- Crystle Stewart, Miss USA 2008
- Daniel Stewart (disambiguation), multiple people
- Darrell Stewart (American football) (born 1996), American football player
- David Stewart (disambiguation), multiple people
- Dennis Stewart (disambiguation), multiple people
- Derek Stewart (footballer) (born 1948), Scottish footballer
- DJ Stewart (born 1993), American baseball player
- D.J. Stewart Jr. (born 1999), American basketball player
- Donald Stewart (disambiguation), multiple people
- Dugald Stewart (1753–1828), Scottish philosopher
- Duncan Stewart (disambiguation), multiple people
- Dylan Stewart (born 2005), American football player
- Earnie Stewart (born 1969), Dutch-born American soccer player
- Ed Stewart (1941–2016), British broadcaster
- Ed Stewart (American football) (born 1972), American football player
- Edwin C. Stewart (1864–1921), New York politician
- E. J. Stewart (1877–1929), American college sports coach
- Elijah Stewart (born 1995), American basketball player in Israeli Basketball Premier League
- Elinore Pruitt Stewart (1876–1933), American homesteader in Wyoming and memoirist
- Evan Stewart (disambiguation), multiple people
- G. Fowler Stewart (1861–1917), businessman in South Australia
- Frederick Stewart (disambiguation), multiple people
- Gary Stewart (disambiguation), multiple people
- Gay Stewart, American physicist
- George Stewart (disambiguation), multiple people
- Sir Gershom Stewart (1857–1929), British businessman in China, Conservative MP
- Glenn Stewart (born 1984), Australian rugby league player
- Grace Campbell Stewart (died 1863), British painter
- Grover Stewart (born 1993), American football player
- Haldane Stewart (1868–1942), English musician and cricketer
- Harriet Bradford Tiffany Stewart (1798–1830), American missionary
- Harry Stewart (1908–1956), American comedian
- Helen Stewart (disambiguation), multiple people
- Henry Stewart (disambiguation), multiple people
- Homer Joseph Stewart (1915–2007), American aeronautical engineer
- Iain Stewart (disambiguation), multiple people
- Ian Stewart (disambiguation), multiple people
- Isabel Stewart North, American song composer and publisher
- Isabel Stewart Way (1904–1978), American writer
- Isabella Stewart (disambiguation), multiple people
- Isaiah Stewart (born 2001), American basketball player
- Ivan Stewart, American racing driver
- Jackie Stewart (born 1939), Scottish Formula One driver
- Jacqueline Stewart (born 1970), American scholar of cinema studies and television host
- James Stewart (disambiguation), multiple people
- Jane Stewart (disambiguation), multiple people
- Janet Stewart (disambiguation), multiple people
- Jacqueline Stewart (born 1970), American professor and television host
- Jasmin Stewart (born 1998), Australian rules footballer
- Jaylin Stewart (born 2005), American basketball player
- Jean Stewart (disambiguation), multiple people
- Jermaine Stewart (1957–1997), American R&B and pop singer
- J. I. M. Stewart (1906–1994), Scottish novelist writing as Michael Innes
- Joffre Stewart (1925–2019), American poet, anarchist and pacifist
- John Stewart (disambiguation), multiple people
- Jon Stewart (born 1962), American political satirist
- Jordan Stewart (disambiguation), multiple people
- Jorge Stewart, Argentine rugby union player
- Josh Stewart (disambiguation), multiple people
- Josaiah Stewart (born 2003), American football player
- Julius LeBlanc Stewart (1855–1919), American artist
- Kaleb Stewart (1975–2021), American musician
- Karen Weldin Stewart, Insurance Commissioner of Delaware
- Kate Stewart, musical artist
- Katherine Stewart-Jones (born 1995), Canadian cross-country skier
- Kathleen Stewart, Australian writer
- Katie Stewart (writer) (1934–2013), British cookery writer
- Kevin Stewart (footballer) (born 1993), English football player
- Kordell Stewart (born 1972), American football player
- Kristen Stewart (born 1990), American actress
- Laney Stewart (born 1966), American musical artist
- Laura A. M. Stewart, British historian
- LeConte Stewart (1891–1990), American artist
- Leslie Stewart, Trinidad and Tobago boxer
- Leslie Stewart (born 1949), British writer
- Linda Stewart, American politician
- Lizbeth Stewart (1948–2013), American ceramist
- Lori Stewart Gonzalez (born 1957), American speech pathologist and academic administrator
- Lou Stewart, labor activist
- Louis Stewart (disambiguation), multiple people
- Loy Stewart, Australian rules footballer
- Lynne Stewart (1939–2017), American lawyer and criminal
- Lynne Marie Stewart (1946–2025), American actress
- M. J. Stewart (born 1995), American football player
- Malcolm Stewart (disambiguation), multiple people
- Manuel Stewart, American baseball player
- Martha Stewart (born 1941), American businesswoman, writer and television personality
- Marvin Stewart (1912–2009), American football player
- Marvin Stewart (basketball), American basketball player
- Mary Stuart (disambiguation), multiple people
- Matthew Stewart (disambiguation), multiple people
- Max Stewart, Australian racing driver
- Max Stewart (born 1993), Jamaican judoka
- Maya Stewart, rugby player
- Michael Stewart (disambiguation), multiple people
- Monica Faith Stewart (born 1952), American politician
- Nathan Stewart-Jarrett, English actor
- Nellie Stewart (1858–1931), Australian stage actress
- Nellie Stewart (politician) (1882–1946), American politician
- Nels Stewart (1899–1957), Canadian ice hockey player
- Noah Stewart (born 1978), American opera singer
- Nora Stewart Coleman (1920–2005), First Lady of American Samoa
- Norm Stewart, American basketball coach and player
- Oliver Stewart (1896–1976), British World War II pilot
- Oliver W. Stewart (1867–1937), American politician
- Pam Stewart, Florida government official
- Patrick Stewart (disambiguation), multiple people
- Paul Stewart (disambiguation), multiple people
- Paula Stewart, American actress
- Payne Stewart (1957–1999), American golfer
- Perez M. Stewart (1858–1924), New York politician
- Potter Stewart (1915–1985), US Supreme Court justice
- R. K. Stewart, American architect
- Rab Stewart, Scottish footballer
- Rab Stewart (born 1962), Scottish footballer
- Randall Steward Pitchford II (born 1971), American businessman
- Randy Stewart, American sports shooter
- Ray Stewart (disambiguation), multiple people
- Rayna Stewart (born 1973), American football player and coach
- Reba Stewart, Australian martial artist
- Redd Stewart, American singer-songwriter
- Reginald Stewart (disambiguation), multiple people
- Rena Stewart (1923–2023), Scottish World War II codebreaker and journalist
- Rex Stewart (1907–1967), American jazz cornetist
- Richard Stewart (born 1959) mayor of Coquitlam, British Columbia
- Richard Stewart (theatre) (1827–1902), Australian stage actor
- Richard Stewart Dobbs (1808–1888), British civil servant
- Riley Stewart, American baseball player
- Robert Stewart (disambiguation), multiple people
- Rod Stewart (born 1945), British singer
- Rosemary Stewart (business theorist) (1924–2015), British researcher and writer in business management
- Roy Mackenzie Stewart (1889–1964), British neurologist
- Ryan Stewart (disambiguation), multiple people
- Samuel Swaim Stewart (1855–1898), known as S. S. Stewart, American musician, publisher, banjo manufacturer
- Scott Stewart (disambiguation), multiple people
- Sean Stewart (basketball) (born 2005), American basketball player
- Shemar Stewart (born 2003), American football player
- Sidney Stewart, American architect
- Stanley Stewart (disambiguation), multiple people
- Stephen Stewart (disambiguation), multiple people
- Steve Stewart (disambiguation), multiple people
- Steven Stewart (disambiguation), multiple people
- Stub Stewart (1888–1974), American athlete and coach
- Taegan Stewart, Canadian soccer player
- Tatum Stewart, Australian field hockey player
- Ted Stewart (born 1948), American judge
- Terence P. Stewart, American lawyer
- Terion Stewart (born 2001), American football player
- Thomas Stewart (disambiguation), multiple people
- Tony Stewart (disambiguation), multiple people
- Trenton Lee Stewart, American writer
- Trey Stewart, American politician
- Trish Stewart (born 1946), American television actress
- Tyler Stewart (born 1967), Canadian drummer
- Walter Stewart (disambiguation), multiple people
- William Stewart (disambiguation), multiple people
- Wyatt A. Stewart, American businessman and career political fundraiser
- Wynn Stewart (1934–1985), American country music singer-songwriter and musician
- American family members of Sly and the Family Stone:
  - Sylvester Stewart (Sly Stone) (born 1944), singer-songwriter, frontman
  - Rose Stewart (Rose Stone) (born 1945), singer/keyboardist
  - Fred Stewart (Freddie Stone) (born 1946), singer/guitarist
  - Vaetta Stewart (Vet Stone) (born 1949), singer

=== Given name ===
- Stewart "Frank" Abbott (1885–1947), Australian rules footballer
- Stewart Adams (1923–2019), English chemist
- Stewart Adams, Canadian ice hockey player
- Stewart Alexander (born 1951), American politician
- Stewart Alsop, American journalist and political analyst
- Stewart Anderson, Scottish lawn and indoor bowler
- Stewart Anderson (born 1911), Australian rules footballer
- Stewart Anderson, Australian judge
- Stewart Bagnani (1903–1996), Canadian academic
- Stewart Baker (born 1947), American lawyer
- Stewart Barlow, American politician
- Stewart Brand (born 1938), American writer
- Stewart Brain, Australian judoka
- Stewart Carmichael (1867–1950), Scottish painter
- Stewart Carr, American sprint canoer
- Stewart Carson (born 1976), South African badminton player
- Stuart Carswell, Scottish footballer
- Stewart Castledine, English footballer
- Stewart Clegg (born 1947), British-born, Australian sociologist
- Stewart Cink, American professional golfer
- Stewart Cole (born 1955), British-French microbiologist
- Stewart "Stu" Cole (born 1966), American baseball player and coach
- Stewart Copeland, American drummer, best known as the drummer in The Police
- Stewart Cowley, British writer and artist
- Stewart Culin, American ethnographer and author
- Stewart Dalzell (1943–2019), American judge
- Stewart Davidson, Scottish footballer
- Stewart Davies, accountant and chairman of Darlington Football Club from 2004 to 2006
- Stewart Davies, Australian bowls player
- Stewart Davidson, Scottish footballer
- Stewart Davison, English cricketer
- Stewart Dickson (born 1950), Northern Ireland politician
- Stewart Donald, English businessman and football administrator
- Stewart Ranken Douglas (1871–1936), British pathologist, bacteriologist, and immunologist
- Stewart Douglas-Mann, British rower
- Stewart Dugdale, English film score composer
- Stewart Duke-Elder (1898–1978), Scottish ophthalmologist
- Stewart Duncan (disambiguation), multiple people
- Stewart Dunsker (born 1934), American neurosurgeon and professor
- Stewart Evans, English football player
- Stewart Evans (1908–1996), Canadian ice hockey player
- Stewart Farquharson (born 1940), British rower
- Stewart Farrar (1916–2000), British writer and Wiccan
- Stewart Faught (1924–2005), American football player and coach
- Stewart Faulkner (born 1969), British athlete
- Stewart "Dirk" Fischer, musical artist
- Stewart Ford (born 1964), British businessman
- Stewart Forsyth, Scottish footballer
- Stewart Fotheringham, British-American geographer
- Stewart Gardner, Scottish-American golfer
- Stewart Geddes, Australian rules footballer and coach
- Stewart Ginn (born 1949), Australian professional golfer
- Stewart Glenister (born 1988), American Samoan swimmer
- Stewart Goodyear, Canadian pianist and composer
- Stewart Granger, English-American actor, born James Stewart
- Stewart Gull (disambiguation), multiple people
- Stewart Guthrie (1948–1990), New Zealand police sergeant
- Stewart Hagestad, American golfer
- Stewart Hall (disambiguation), multiple people
- Stewart Haslinger, English chess grandmaster
- Stewart Headlam (1847–1924), English Christian socialist
- Stewart Home (born 1962), English artist, filmmaker, and writer
- Stewart Hooson, English Methodist minister
- Stewart Hoover, American academic
- Stewart Hosie, Scottish politician
- Stewart Houston (born 1949), Scottish football player and manager
- Stewart Imlach, Scottish footballer
- Stewart Jones, American politician
- Stewart H. Jones (1909–1976), American attorney
- Stewart Lee, English stand-up comedian, writer, director and musician
- Stewart Loewe (born 1968), Australian rules footballer
- Stewart Lord (1950–2022), Australian rules footballer
- Stewart Loudoun-Shand, Victoria Cross recipient
- Stewart Low, Scottish footballer
- Stewart MacFarlane, Australian painter
- Stewart Mackinnon, Scottish film producer
- Stewart Maclean, British journalist and editor
- Stewart Maclennan (1903–1973), New Zealand artist
- Stewart McAllister (1914–1962), British documentary film editor
- Stewart McArthur, Australian politician
- Stewart McCallum (1927–2008), Scottish footballer
- Stewart McColl, Australian racing driver
- Stewart McCrae (cartoonist), Australian cartoonist
- Stewart McCrae, Canadian politician
- Stewart McDonald (disambiguation), multiple people
- Stewart McInnes, Canadian politician
- Stewart McKimmie, Scottish footballer
- Stewart McKinney (disambiguation), multiple people
- Stewart McLatchie, Australian rules footballer
- Stewart McLaurin, American author
- Stewart McLean (1941–2006), Scottish actor and businessman
- Stewart McLean, Canadian politician
- Stewart McSweyn, Australian long-distance runner
- Stewart Mills, Australian Rugby League player
- Stewart Parker, Northern Irish playwright
- Stewart F. Parker, British scientist
- Stewart Payne, Canadian Anglican Archbishop
- Stewart Perowne, British diplomat, archaeologist, explorer, and historian
- Stewart Pether, English cricketer, British Army officer, and educator
- Stewart Petrie (born 1970), Scottish footballer
- Stewart G. Pollock (born 1932), American judge
- Stewart Pollens, musical instrument historian
- Stewart Purvis, British broadcaster, broadcasting executive, author, academic
- Stewart Raffill (born 1942), British writer and director
- Stewart Rahr, American businessman
- Stewart Reid (1867–1952), New Zealand politician
- Stewart Resnick, American businessman
- Stewart Reuben (1939–2025), British chess player, organiser, and author
- Stewart Rhodes (born 1966), American Oath Keepers leader and January 6th seditionist
- Stewart Robson (born 1964), English broadcaster and former football player
- Stewart Ryrie (disambiguation)
- Stewart Stevenson, SNP Member of the Scottish Parliament for Banffshire & Buchan Coast, and Minister for Transport, Infrastructure and Climate Change
- Stewart Sukuma, Mozambican singer
- Stewart Sutin, American academic administrator
- Stewart Talbot, English footballer
- Stewart Turner (1930–2022), Australian geophysicist
- Stewart Udall (1920–2010), American politician
- Stewart Uoo (born 1985), American artist
- Stewart Van Vliet (1815–1901), American military officer who fought for the Union in the American Civil War
- Stewart Yetton (born 1985), English footballer
- Stewart Terence Herbert Young (1915–1994), British film director and screenwriter

== Fictional characters ==
=== Surname ===
- John Stewart, a DC Comics character, one of the Green Lanterns
- Troy Stewart, also known as Tyroc, DC Comics character
- Joseph "Proposition Joe" Stewart, a character from The Wire

=== Given name ===
- Stewart Gilligan Griffin, a Family Guy character
- Stewart, a character in the 1987 American comedy movie Revenge of the Nerds II: Nerds in Paradise
- Stewart Stevenson, a character in Beavis and Butt-Head

== See also ==
- Stuart (name)
- Steuart (disambiguation)
- Steward (surname)
- Steward (given name)
- Stu
