= Brian Stewart =

Brian Stewart may refer to:

- Brian Stewart (phlebotomist) (born 1966), American phlebotomist, convicted for injecting son with HIV
- Brian Stewart (journalist) (born 1942), Canadian journalist
- Brian Stewart (American football) (born 1964), defensive coordinator
- Brian Edward Stewart, former British Ambassador to Algeria
- Brian W. Stewart (born 1957), member of the Illinois General Assembly for the 89th district
- Brian Stewart (diplomat) (1922–2015), Scottish soldier, colonial official and diplomat
- Brian Stewart (playwright), British playwright
- Brian Stewart (archaeologist) (born 1978), anthropological archaeologist
- Brian Stewart (Ohio politician), Ohio state representative
- Brian Stewart (Tennessee politician), Tennessee state representative

== See also ==
- Bryan Stewart (born 1985), footballer
