= Derek Stewart =

Derek Stewart may refer to:

- Derek Steward, New Zealand sprinter and hurdler
- Derek Stewart (footballer) (born 1948), Scottish footballer
