= Tony Stewart (disambiguation) =

Tony Stewart (born 1971) is an American auto racing driver.

Tony Stewart may also refer to:

- A. T. Q. Stewart (1929–2010), Northern Irish author and historian, best known as Tony Stewart
- Tony Stewart (American football) (born 1979), professional football player for the Oakland Raiders
- Tony Stewart (Australian racing driver), Australian racing driver who participated in the 1973 Singapore Grand Prix
- Tony Stewart (politician) (born 1956), Australian politician
- Tony Stewart (Canadian football) (born 1968), former running back in the Canadian Football League
- Tony Stewart (Coronation Street), a fictional character from the long-running soap opera

== See also ==
- Anthony Stewart (disambiguation)
- Tony Steward (disambiguation)
- Stewart (name)
