= Steuart =

Steuart is a French, Scottish, and English surname that may refer to:

== People with the surname ==
- Adam Steuart (Stuart, Stewart) (1591–1645), Scottish philosopher and controversialist
- Agnes Louisa Steuart (1879–1972), member of the New Zealand Legislative Council under her married name Weston
- David Steuart (born 1916), Saskatchewan politician, cabinet minister and Senator
- George H. Steuart (brigadier general) (1828–1903), American military officer
- George H. Steuart (diplomat) (1907–1998), American diplomat and Foreign Service officer
- George H. Steuart (militia general) (1790–1867), US general who fought during the War of 1812
- George H. Steuart (politician) (1700–1784), Scottish physician, tobacco planter, and Loyalist politician in colonial Maryland
- James Steuart (economist) (1712–1780), British economist
- John Steuart Curry (1897–1946), American painter
- Margaret Steuart Pollard (1903–1996), British scholar of Sanskrit, poet and bard of the Cornish language
- Richard D. Steuart (1880–1951), American journalist in Baltimore, Maryland
- Richard Sprigg Steuart (1797–1876), American physician in Maryland, pioneer of the treatment of mental illness
- Robert Steuart (1806–1843) British Whig politician
- Ronald Steuart (1898–1988), member of Australian Watercolour Institute
- William Steuart (disambiguation), several people

== People with the given name ==
- Steuart Bayley (1836–1925), British civil servant and Lieutenant-Governor of Bengal 1879–1882
- Steuart Bedford (born 1939), British orchestral and opera conductor
- Steuart Campbell (born 1937), British skeptic and investigative science writer
- George Steuart Hume (1747–1787), Maryland physician and landowner who emigrated to Scotland before the American Revolutionary War
- Steuart Pringle (1928–2013), British Commandant General Royal Marines, seriously injured by an IRA bomb
- Steuart Smith (born 1952), American guitarist and multi-instrumentalist, vocalist, writer, producer with American rock band the Eagles
- Steuart Walton (born 1981), American heir, attorney, businessman, philanthropist
- Steuart Wilson (1889–1996), British tenor and arts administrator

== Places ==
- Steuart Hall, mansion built in the late 18th century on the outskirts of Baltimore, Maryland
- Steuart Blakemore Building, now part of the Mary Ball Washington Museum and Library in Lancaster, Virginia
- Don Chee Way and Steuart station, light rail station in San Francisco, California

== See also ==
- Seton-Steuart baronets, later Seton-Steuart baronetcy, of Allanton in the County of Lanark, a title in the baronetage of the United Kingdom
- Stewart (name)
- Stuart (name)
- Steward (surname)
