= Dance Your Ph.D. =

Dance contest for scientists, sponsored by AAAS

- Status: Active
- Genre: Science & Art Competition
- Frequency: Annually
- Established: 2008
- Founder: John Bohannon
- Participants: Scientists who are working toward or have completed a Ph.D.
- Sponsors: AAAS, Science Magazine, Primer.ai
- Website: sciencemag.org/projects/dance-your-phd

Dance Your Ph.D. is a contest wherein scientists express their research through dance. The purpose of the contest is to educate by explaining complex theories through interpretive dance. The contest was first held in 2008. Dance Your Ph.D. is sponsored by American Association for the Advancement of Science (AAAS), Science magazine, and Primer.ai, an artificial intelligence technology company.

== Origins ==
Dance Your Ph.D. is an international science competition founded by John Bohannon, who studies microbiology and artificial intelligence, is a former contributing correspondent for Science, and the current Director of Science for Primer.ai. Bohannon explained that the idea for Dance Your Ph.D. began at a New Year's Eve party that was "heavy on scientist attendees and light on the dancing." To get people up and moving, he turned the party into a dance contest where the attendees had to explain the research project they were working on without using words.

Dance Your Ph.D. started as a live event at the IMP Vienna in 2008. From across Europe, scientists gathered to watch their colleagues explain their Ph.D. thesis with interpretive dance. A Ph.D. or Doctor of Philosophy is the highest academic degree awarded in a course of study. Candidates pursuing a Ph.D. are required to engage in applied or original research to test a theory and to add to the existing body of knowledge in their particular discipline or field of study.

Dance Your Ph.D. was never intended to develop into a yearly event, but the question starting coming from scientists around the world asking "When is the next dance contest?" In response to the demand, Science officially launched the Dance Your Ph.D. contest in 2009. The four winners from that year's contest worked with professional choreographers to conduct a scientific dance experiment where participants were asked to match the dance to the science that inspired it.

In 2010, the categories for the event switched from grad students, postdocs, and professors to the scientific fields of biology, chemistry, physics, and social science. In the first three years of the contest, Dance Your Ph.D. videos had been viewed over 750,000 times. Bohannon surveyed everybody who had participated in the contest and asked them why they danced as scientists. He discovered that while most did it as a means of education, one danced to explore the spontaneous assembly and falling apart of the cell's skeleton on microtubules while others did it to reexamine their work, similar to writing an abstract, or to celebrate the intersection of art and science.

== Winning entries ==
Year	Winning Category	Winner	Title
2025	Chemistry	Sulo Roukka	Insights into oral chemesthetic perception
2024	Social Science	Weliton Menário Costa	Kangaroo Time
2023	Chemistry	Checkers Marshall	nanoMOFs
2022	Biology	Povilas Šimonis	Electroporation of Yeast Cells
2020	Physics	Jakub Kubečka	Formation, Structure, and Stability of Atmospheric Molecular Clusters
2019	Social Science	Antonia Groneberg	Early Life Social Experiences Shape Social Avoidance Kinematics in Larval Zebrafish
2018	Physics	Pramodh Senarath Yapa	Superconductivity: The Musical!
2017	Physics	Nancy Scherich	Representations of the Braid Groups
2016	Chemistry	Jacob Brubert	A Polymeric Prosthetic Heart Valve
2015	Social Science	Florence Metz	How do Policy Networks Influence the Quality of our Policies
2014	Biology	Uma Nagendra	Plant-Soil Feedbacks After Severe Tornado Damage
2013	Biology	Cedric Tan	Sperm Competition Between Brothers and Female Choice
2012	Chemistry	Peter Liddicoat	A Super-Alloy Is Born: The Romantic Revolution of Lightness & Strength
2011	Physics	Joel Miller	Microstructure-Property Relationships in Ti2448 Components Produced by Selective Laser Melting: A Love Story
2010	Chemistry	Maureen McKeague	Selection of a DNA Aptamer for Homocysteine using SELEX
2009	Graduate Student	Sue Lynn Lau	The Role of Vitamin D in Beta Cell Function
2008	First Content	Brian Stewart	Antelope Hunt

== 13th annual contest winners - 2020 ==
Physics and Overall winner: Jakub Kubečka

Jakub Kubečka, Ivo Neefjes, and Vitus Besel are Ph.D. students of atmospheric science at the Institute for Atmospheric and Earth System Research (INAR) at the University of Helsinki in Finland. In 4 minutes and 37 seconds, the researchers combine rap and dance to describe their research into the computational study of molecular clusters. Through their research, Kubečka et al. hope to, among other lines of inquiry, understand the processes related to atmospheric molecular clusters. "This can make it easier to evaluate the dangers posed by air pollution and hopefully lead to policies or technologies that improve, for example, urban air quality" says Kubečka.

Chemistry: Mikael Minier

Mikael Minier, Ph.D. is a graduate of MIT, a former member of inorganic chemistry Professor Stephen J. Lippard’s research group, and a current software engineer at WaveXR, located in Los Angeles. Minier’s interpretation of his dissertation "Biomimetic Carboxylate-Bridged Diiron Complexes: From Solution Behavior to Modeling the Secondary Coordination Sphere" uses breaking, tutting, animation, robot, and waving dance styles to explain his thesis. Minier, who has an interest in science edutainment, entered the competition to challenge himself to find an unconventional way to teach chemistry. He was able to combine his passion for dance with his chemistry background. "Moving forward, I hope to use gaming to explore edutainment in a professional capacity," said Minier.

Social Sciences: Magdalena Dorner-Pau

Magdalena Dorner-Pau is a postdoc at the University of Graz in Austria where she is a member of the Faculty of Humanities. Her areas of work include didactics of the humanities, teaching and learning research, language teaching research, didactics, and the performing arts. Through dance, Dorner-Pau attempts to answer the question "how do we describe in words what we see?"

Biology: Fanon Julienne

Fanon Julienne is a Postdoctoral researcher for Ariane Group in ENSAM and a student at Le Mans University in France where she is studying the problem of the accumulation of plastics in water. In her dance explanation of her thesis "Fragmentation of plastics: effect of the environment and the nature of the polymer on the size and the shape of generated fragments" she illustrates how water and sun affect the breakdown of plastic and pollute the water using two teams of belly dancers.

COVID-19: Heather Masson-Forsythe

Masson-Forsythe used ballet, modern dance, and hip hop to explain how to stop the coronavirus from replicating. She is a researcher at the Barbar Lab in the Biochemistry & Biophysics department of Oregon State University. In the final scene of the video a graphic appears, stating "Dance choreography in this video takes place over 300 seconds, one second for every thousand people who have died from SARS-CoV-2 as of December 2020 in the United States alone."

== Previous overall winners ==
=== 2020 - Jakub Kubečka (Physics) ===
See paragraph above

=== 2019 - Antonia Groneberg (Social science) ===
Inspired by zebrafish larvae, Groneberg's choreography mixes science and dance into a reflective and artistically work of art that depicts how the motions of groups of zebrafish larvae stimulated each larva's behavior and brain development. She demonstrated the impact of this phenomenon by raising some larvae in isolation and documented the difference between the two groups. Groneberg was a dancer and taught jazz and modern dance as a side job as she pursued her doctorate in neuroscience at the Champalimaud Research Foundation located in Lisbon, Portugal.

=== 2018 - Pramodh Senarath Yapa (Physics) ===
Pramodh Senarath Yapa is a Ph.D. student at the University of Alberta who studies the physics of ultra-cold materials, including superconductivity. Superconductivity happens when single electrons pair up when cooled to super-low temperatures, resulting in the loss of electrical resistance. Once Yapa began to “...think of electrons as unsociable people who suddenly become joyful once paired up, imagining them as dancers was a no-brainer.”

=== 2017 - Nancy Scherich (Physics) ===
A doctoral student studying mathematics at the University of California, Santa Barbara, Nancy Scherich called on her experience as a lifelong dancer to show how algebra is used to study geometric shapes. Scherich explained “...the first hurdle in communicating mathematics is to make the abstract concepts relevant and relatable to a largely math-phobic society. The human element of dancing helps to remove the veil of intimidation...”

=== 2016 - Jacob Brubert (Chemistry) ===
Using salsa, tap, and acrobatics, Jacob Brubert's “Dance Your Ph.D.” entry explains the science of heart valve bioengineering. Salsa dancers depict how one type of heart valve is made from animal tissue. The blood tolerates it well, but it has limited durability. Tap dancers are used to explain a mechanical valve with rigid leaflets. The valve is durable enough to outlive the patient, but it is poorly tolerated by the blood and requires lifelong anticoagulation. Searching for a better option, Brubert wonders if a flexible polymer might be used in prosthetic heart valves to achieve durability and blood compatibility. Using hula hoops, Cyr wheels, juggling and water pistols, Brubert shows that the blood flow in the polymeric valve is good and well-tolerated by the blood. The durability is mediocre, but not good enough. Lamenting “why…..” the scientist falls to his knees as the experiment falls apart.

=== 2015 - Florence Metz (Social science) ===
Florence Metz was the first social scientist to claim the winner's spot in the 8th Annual Dance Your Ph.D. contest. Metz, studying at the University of Bern, used dance to explore the question of how to achieve effective water protection policies. Salsa, acrobatics and hip hop represent the diverse political groups who fight over and eventually come together to discuss the protection and use of water resources. In the video, Metz equates successful water policies to the choreography that unites the diverse dancers.

=== 2014 - Uma Nagendra (Biology) ===
Uma Negendra turned her love of doing circus aerials and her study of plant biology into a dance to explain her Ph.D. She found that destructive forces like tornadoes are actually good for trees. Her research has shown that tree seedlings get a reprieve from certain parasitic fungi following a tornado which allows them to flourish. Negendra and a group of aerialist friends hang from trapezes in a choreographed ballet to represent the mature tree, the seedlings, the pathogens, and the tornado.

=== 2013 - Cedric Tan (Biology) ===
Cedric Tan, a biologist at University of Oxford, took the top prize in 2013 for his research into the effect of brotherhood on sperm competition and female choice in the red jungle fowl. According to Tan, ...”the dance movements [swing, water ballet, and modern jazz] in this video reflect the competitive nature in the sperm world.”

=== 2012 - Peter Liddicoat (Chemistry) ===
Peter Liddicoat's PhD thesis is entitled the "Evolution of nanostructural architecture in 7000 series aluminium alloys during strengthening by age-hardening and severe plastic deformation.” Though at first reluctant to enter the Dance Your Ph.D. contest, he came to the “…realization that this would tackle head-on the ominous question, 'So what is your Ph.D. about?'" Liddicoat, with the help of numerous friends, used clowning, juggling, and a big dance number to mimic the crystal lattices that he studies with atomic microscopy at Microscopy Australia's atom probe instrument at the University of Sydney.

=== 2011 - Joel Miller (Physics) ===
Joel Miller's research at the University of Western Australia focused on how to overcome the main reason why orthopedic implants fail using new materials and advanced manufacturing processes with the hope of creating more durable implants that will reduce the need for revision surgery. Miller used 2,200 photographs to make the video as he did not have access to a video camera and “…also (and more importantly) because stop motion, even though tedious to shoot, is fun.”

=== 2010 - Maureen McKeague (Chemistry) ===
McKeague's Dance Your Ph.D. entry depicted an interpretation of her research on designer molecules. McKeague stated that the project was a group effort, just like her research, that involved every Ph.D. and undergraduate student working in Maria DeRosa's lab at Carleton University in Ottawa.

=== 2009 - Sue Lynn Lau (Graduate student) ===
In 2009 the categories for Dance Your Ph.D. were Graduate Student, Post-Doc, Professor, and Popular Choice

Sue Lynn Lau was a graduate student at the University of Sydney in Australia. Lau's submission puts to dance the hypothesis that vitamin D could improve beta-call function and insulin secretion, thus protecting against diabetes.

=== 2008 - Brian Stewart ===
Brian Stewart, an archaeologist at Oxford and Giulia Saltini-Semerari, a fellow archaeologist, were the winners of the first ever Dance Your Ph.D. contest. Stewart was exploring how early humans in South Africa cooked, shared, and disposed of food through his thesis “Refitting repasts: a spatial exploration of food processing, sharing, cooking and disposal at the Dunefield Midden campsite, South Africa." Their video featured Stewart as a hunter performing in a loin cloth and Saltini-Semerari as an antelope in a highly stylized chase in which the hunter kills the antelope, processes it, and distributes food.
