= Steward (surname) =

Steward is an English occupational surname.

Notable people surnamed Steward include the following:

- Alan Steward, record producer, songwriter and recording artist
- Alf Steward (1896–after 1939), English football player and manager
- Augustine Steward (1491–1571), English politician
- Austin Steward (1793–1860), American slave, abolitionist and author
- Brad Steward, American snowboarder and entrepreneur
- David Steward (born 1951), American business executive
- Dean Steward (1923–1979), American football player
- Derek Steward (fl. 1950), New Zealand runner
- DJ Steward (born 2001), American basketball player
- Eddie Mae Steward (1938–2000), American civil rights activist
- Emanuel Steward (1944-2012), American boxing trainer and commentator
- Ernest Steward (1910–1990), British cinematographer
- Frederick Campion Steward (1904–1993), British botanist and plant physiologist
- Gabriel Steward (1731–1792), British politician
- Gabriel Tucker Steward (d. 1836), British politician
- Gregory Steward (born 1962), American canoer
- Harold Macdonald Steward (1904–1977), British engineer and politician
- Herbie Steward (1926–2003), American saxophonist
- Jimmy Steward (born 1946), Honduran football player
- John Steward (1874–1937), Anglican bishop of Melanesia
- Joseph Steward (1753–1822), American artist
- Julian Steward (1902–1972), American anthropologist
- Katrina Elayne Steward (born 1979), American choreographer, dancer, singer and actress
- Lewis Steward (1824–1896), American politician
- Natalie Steward (born 1943), British swimmer
- Nicholas Steward (MP for Cambridge University) (before 1547–1634), English politician
- Osbern the Steward (before 1007–c. 1040), Norman steward
- Pat Steward (born 1962), Canadian musician
- Peter Steward (born 1942), Australian Australian rules footballer
- Reddy Steward (born 2001), American football player
- Richard Steward (c. 1593–1651), English churchman
- Richard Augustus Tucker Steward (1773–1842), English politician
- Robert Steward (disambiguation)
- Ron Steward (born 1927), Australian media personality
- Samuel Steward (1909–1993), American writer, professor, tattoo artist and pornographer
- Simon Steward (c. 1572–after 1629), English politician
- Susan McKinney Steward (1847–1918), American physician and author
- Theophilus Gould Steward (1843–1924), American author, educator and clergyman
- Tim Steward, Australian musician, singer and songwriter
- Tony Steward (cricketer) (1941–2002), South African cricketer
- Tony Steward (American football) (born 1992), American football player
- William Steward (New Zealand politician) (1841–1912), New Zealand politician
- William Steward (British politician) (1901–1987), British politician

== See also ==
- Stewart (surname)
