= Stewart Ryrie =

Stewart Ryrie may refer to:

- Stewart Ryrie (colonial settler) (1778–1852), colonial settler of New South Wales
- Stewart Ryrie Jr (1812–1882), his son, Scottish-born Australian pastoralist, surveyor and settler

== See also ==
- Stewart (name)
- Ryrie
