= Ryrie =

Ryrie /ˈraɪəri/ is a surname. Notable people with the surname include:

- Alec Ryrie (born 1971), British historian of Protestant Christianity
- Charles Caldwell Ryrie (1925–2016), American Christian writer and theologian
- Christobelle Grierson-Ryrie (born 1992), New Zealand fashion model
- Phineas Ryrie (1829–1892), Scottish tea merchant

Scottish–Australian Ryrie family

- Stewart Ryrie (1778–1852), patriarch
- William Ryrie (1805–1856), Scottish-born
- Stewart Ryrie Jr (1812–1882)
  - Alexander Ryrie (1827–1909), Australian politician
    - Sir Granville Ryrie, (1865–1937), Australian soldier and politician
  - John Cassels Ryrie (1826–1900)
    - John Ryrie (1886–1927), Australian rower
  - David Ryrie (1829–1893), Australian politician

== See also ==
- Ryrie Rock, geographical formation in Antarctica
