= International Archives of Medicine =

- Discipline: Medicine
- Peer-reviewed: No
- Language: English

Publication details
- History: 2008–present
- Publisher: iMed.pub
- Open access: Yes

Standard abbreviations
- ISO 4: Int. Arch. Med.

Indexing
- ISSN: 1755-7682

Links
- Journal homepage

The study by John Bohannon.

The International Archives of Medicine is an open access medical journal covering all aspects of medicine. It was established in 2008 and published by BioMed Central until the end of 2014. Starting in 2015, the journal is being published by iMed.pub, the official publisher of the Internet Medical Society, and restructured as a megajournal on all areas of medicine. The journal was abstracted and indexed from 2009 until its delisting in 2015 in Scopus. The editor-in-chief is Ricardo Correa.

In 2015, as part of a sting operation, science journalist John Bohannon submitted an intentionally flawed study that claimed that eating chocolate aided weight-loss to the International Archives of Medicine. The article was accepted without peer review by the journal's CEO, Carlos Vasquez, who called the manuscript "outstanding" and published it without any change for a fee of €600. The journal editors later said that the article hadn't been accepted and was posted on the journal website only "for some hours", while Bohannon produced previous correspondence from the editors that said otherwise.

The journal's publishers, Internet Medical Publishing (and now iMed.pub), are both listed as potentially predatory publishers on "Beall's list" compiled by librarian Jeffrey Beall.
