= John Bohannon =

American science journalist and scientist

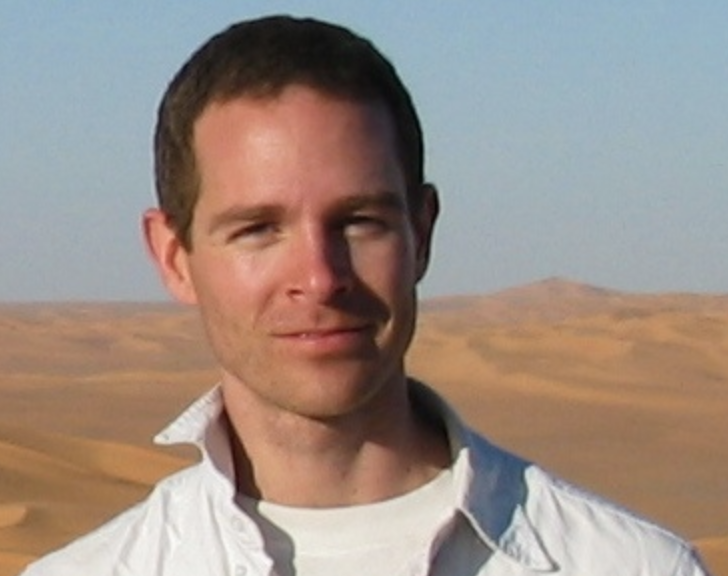
- John Bohannon in Libya in 2007
- Education: University of Oxford (PhD)
- Known for: investigative science journalism; "Gonzo Scientist" on-line column at Science Magazine; "Dance Your PhD" contest
- Scientific career
- Workplaces: Primer (current), Science Magazine; Harvard University
- Thesis: The role of the WSS operon in the adaptive evolution of experimental populations of Pseudomonas Fluorescens SBW25 (2002)
- Doctoral advisor: Paul Rainey
- Website: www.johnbohannon.org

John Bohannon is an American science journalist and scientist who is Director of Science at Primer, an artificial intelligence company headquartered in San Francisco, California. He is known for his career prior to Primer as a science journalist and Harvard University biologist, most notably with his "Gonzo Scientist" online series at Science Magazine and his creation of the annual "Dance Your PhD" contest. His investigative journalism work includes:

- critiquing the Lancet surveys of Iraq War casualties (2006)
- uncovering serious problems with the peer review process at a large number of journals that charge fees to authors (2013)
- showing how uncritical mass media can become victims of claims made in fake scientific papers (2015)

Bohannon is involved in the effective altruism movement. In July 2015 he became a member of Giving What We Can, an organization whose members pledge to give at least 10% of their income to effective charities. He is the older brother of Cat Bohannon.

== Education ==
Bohannon completed his Doctor of Philosophy degree in molecular biology at the University of Oxford in 2002, supervised by Paul Rainey. His doctoral thesis investigated the role of an operon in the adaptive evolution of populations of the bacterium Pseudomonas fluorescens.

== Career and research ==
Bohannon is Director of Science at Primer, a San Francisco, California, company that develops and sells artificial intelligence technology, started by his friend Sean Gourley. Before joining Primer, Bohannon was a contributing correspondent for Science Magazine and also wrote for Discover Magazine, Wired, The Guardian, Christian Science Monitor, and other publications.

=== Investigative science reporting ===
Bohannon has frequently reported on the intersections of science and war. He received a Reuters environmental journalism award in 2006 for his reporting on the water crisis in Gaza. In that year he also critiqued the Lancet surveys of Iraq War casualties. After embedding in southern Afghanistan in 2010, he was the first journalist to convince the US military to voluntarily release civilian casualty data.

Two of his later journalism projects are described below.

==== "Who's Afraid of Peer Review?" ====
In September 2013, Bohannon submitted a fake and very flawed scientific article to a large number of fee-charging open-access publishers, revealing that fewer than 40% were living up to their promise of rigorously peer-reviewing what is published. The spoof paper was accepted by 157 of the 255 open-access journals (61.6%) that said they would review it. This approach was criticized by some commentators, as well as by some publishers of fee charging journals, who complained that his sting targeted only one type of open-access journal and no subscription-based journals, thereby damaging the reputation of the open access movement.

==== Intentionally misleading chocolate study ====
The chocolate study. Click for bigger version and original PDF file.

In 2015, under the pseudonym Johannes Bohannon, John Bohannon wrote a paper – "Chocolate with high Cocoa content as a weight-loss accelerator" – detailing a deliberately bad study that he had designed and run to see how the media would pick up the "meaningless" findings. He worked with film-maker Peter Onneken, who was making a film about junk science in the diet industry and how fad diets became headline news despite having deeply flawed study designs and very little supporting evidence.

Bohannon's bogus study had a tiny sample size of 15 and measured 18 variables, almost guaranteeing an erroneously statistically significant result (false positive) due to random fluctuations in participant outcomes. He told a statistician to deliberately massage the data using overfitting and p-hacking. The study had other serious design flaws as well. The erroneous conclusion was that eating chocolate could assist with weight loss.

Bohannon submitted the manuscript to 20 open-access publishers that were well known for their predatory journals and ended up being published in the International Archives of Medicine. He invented a fake institute, "The Institute of Diet and Health", to go along with his fake name, "Johannes Bohannon", and fabricated a press release that was picked up by the German tabloid Bild, the Daily Star, the Irish Examiner, Cosmopolitan's German website, The Times of India, the German and Indian sites of the Huffington Post, television news in the US, and an Australian morning talk show."

The few journalists who contacted Bohannon (acting as Johannes) asked puff piece questions, and no reporter published information on how many subjects were tested or quoted independent researchers. Most outlets sought to maximize page views by including "vaguely pornographic images of women eating chocolate." Bohannon says:

The only problem with the diet science beat is that it's science. You have to know how to read a scientific paper – and actually bother to do it. For far too long, the people who cover this beat have treated it like gossip, echoing whatever they find in press releases. Hopefully our little experiment will make reporters and readers alike more skeptical.

=== Gonzo Scientist ===
Bohannon's science journalism extended to his on-line "Gonzo Scientist" series at Science Magazine, where he adopted the "Gonzo Scientist" persona. As the Gonzo Scientist, Bohannon took "a look at the intersections among science, culture, and art – and, in true gonzo style, [didn't] shrink from making himself a part of the story. The stories include original art and accompanying multimedia features." In Gonzo Scientist mode, Bohannon's research on whether humans can tell the difference between pâté and dog food led to Stephen Colbert eating cat food on the Colbert Report.

=== Dance Your PhD ===
Many Gonzo Scientist columns were devoted to advertising the Dance Your PhD competition, which Bohannon created in early 2008. The annual competition encourages scientists from all around the world to interpret their doctoral dissertations in dance form. Slate Magazine ran a profile on Bohannon and the competition in 2011.

=== Appearances ===
Bohannon performed with the Black Label Movement dance troupe at TEDxBrussels in November 2011, where he satirized Jonathan Swift's A Modest Proposal by modestly proposing that PowerPoint software be replaced by live dancers. Bohannon then went on to perform with Black Label Movement at TED2012 in March in Long Beach, California. And, in April 2012, Bohannon presented on the Dance Your PhD contest at the Northeast Conference on Science and Skepticism (NECSS).

In 2015, Bohannon appeared on the "Adam Ruins Nutrition" episode of the Adam Ruins Everything truTV series. In 2016, he joined Adam Ruins Everything host Adam Conover on episode 5 of Adam's Adam Ruins Everything podcast series, "Science Journalism with John Bohannon", where he spoke about the fake chocolate study described above and discussed how fraudulent studies are created and promoted through mass media.
