= Josh Stewart (disambiguation) =

Josh Stewart (born 1977) is an American actor.

Josh Stewart may also refer to:

- Josh Stewart (baseball) (born 1978), former Major League Baseball pitcher
- Josh Stewart (American football) (born 1992), American football wide receiver who most recently played for the Wichita Falls Nighthawks
- Josh Stewart (born 1994), American football wide receiver for the San Antonio Commanders

== See also ==
- Stewart (name)
- Stewart (disambiguation)
