= Patrick Stuart =

Patrick Stuart may refer to:

- Patrick Stuart (MP) (c. 1682–1760, Scottish officer in the British Army, Member of Parliament (MP) for Lanarkshire 1750–54
- Patrick Stuart (British Army general) (1777–1855), British Army officer, Governor of Malta 1843–47
- James Patrick Stuart (born 1968), known as Patrick Stuart, American actor and voice artist

== See also ==
- Patrick Stewart (disambiguation)
