= Steward (given name) =

Steward is a masculine given name which may refer to:

- Steward Berroa (born 1999), Dominican baseball player in Major League Baseball
- Steward Ceus (born 1987), Haitian football goalkeeper
- Steward Chikandiwa (born 1984), Zambian footballer
- J. Steward Davis (1890-after 1929), American lawyer and political activist who disappeared
- Steward Pickett, American plant ecologist
- A. Steward Wilson, co-discoverer of C/1961 O1 (Wilson–Hubbard), a comet, in 1961

== See also ==
- Stewart (name), a given name and surname
