= Cameron Stewart (disambiguation) =

Cameron Stewart (born 1975) is a Canadian comic book creator.

Cameron Stewart may also refer to:

- Cameron Stewart (footballer) (born 1991), English footballer
- Cameron Stewart (journalist), Australian journalist
- Cameron Deane Stewart (born 1991), American actor
- Cameron Leigh Stewart, Canadian mathematician

== See also ==
- Cam Stewart (disambiguation)
