= Harold J. Pickerstein =

American attorney (1946–2022)

United States Attorney for the District of Connecticut
- In office 1974–1974
- President: Richard Nixon, Gerald Ford
- Preceded by: Stewart H. Jones
- Succeeded by: Peter Collins Dorsey

Personal details
- Born: July 9, 1946 Bridgeport, Connecticut, U.S.
- Died: August 30, 2022 (aged 76) Fairfield, Connecticut, U.S.
- Spouse: Marjorie Feldman
- Children: 3
- Education: University of Pennsylvania (B.A.); Boston University (J.D.)
- Profession: Attorney

Harold James "Jim" Pickerstein (July 9, 1946 – August 30, 2022) was an American attorney who served as the United States Attorney for the District of Connecticut in 1974.

== Early life and education ==
Pickerstein was born in Bridgeport, Connecticut, on July 9, 1946. He attended the Unquowa School and The Gunnery School, graduating in 1963. He earned his B.A. from the University of Pennsylvania in 1967 and a Juris Doctor degree from Boston University School of Law in 1970.

== Career ==
After law school, Pickerstein joined the U.S. Department of Justice's Honor's Program in Washington, D.C., and later moved to Connecticut, joining the U.S. Attorney's Office for the District of Connecticut. In 1974, he was appointed Acting U.S. Attorney following the stroke of Stewart H. Jones. After leaving office in 1974, Pickerstein entered private practice.

== Legal troubles ==
In 2015, Pickerstein pled guilty to one count of mail fraud for stealing over $600,000 from James Galante’s trust fund between 2011 and 2013. He used the funds for personal expenses, including settling tax debts. After his guilty plea, Pickerstein resigned from the Connecticut Bar in December 2014. He faced a potential sentence of 20 years in prison, along with fines and restitution.

== Personal life ==
Pickerstein married Marjorie Feldman in 1968, and they had three sons: Andrew, Michael, and Edward. Pickerstein died on August 30, 2022, following a long battle with cancer.
