= Stewart Duncan =

Stewart or Stuart Duncan may refer to:

- Stewart Duncan (philosopher), American philosopher
- Stewart Duncan (footballer) (born 1940), Australian rules footballer
- Stuart Duncan (born 1964), American bluegrass musician
- Stuart Duncan (cricketer) (1906–1971), New Zealand cricketer
- Stuart Duncan, Canadian software developer, founder of the Autcraft Minecraft server
- Kyle Duncan (judge) (Stuart Kyle Duncan), American judge

== See also ==
- Duncan Stewart (disambiguation)
