= Walter Stewart =

Walter Stewart may refer to:

== Politics ==
- Walter Stewart, 5th Earl of Menteith (1230s–1290s), also called Walter Bailloch or Walter Balloch
- Walter Stewart, 3rd High Steward of Scotland (c.died 1246)
- Walter Stewart, 6th High Steward of Scotland (c.1296–1327)
- Walter Stewart, Lord of Fife (c.1338–1362)
- Walter Stewart, Earl of Atholl (died 1437), Scottish nobleman
- Walter Stewart, 3rd Laird of Baldorran (c.1480–1575), Scottish landowner
- Walter Stewart, 1st Lord Blantyre (died 1617), Scottish nobleman
- Walter Stewart (MP), Scottish courtier and politician in the House of Commons, 1624–25
- W. F. Alan Stewart (1885–1956), farmer and political figure in Prince Edward Island
- Walter Stewart, Solicitor General for Scotland 1720–21

== Military ==
- Walter Stewart (general) (1756–1796), Pennsylvania officer during the American Revolutionary War
- Walter L. Stewart Jr. (born 1944), United States Army officer
- Walter Travis Stewart (1917–2016), American pilot in the United States Army Air Force

== Other ==
- Walter Stewart (bishop) (c. 1568 – 1635), Scottish Protestant Archbishop of Glasgow
- Walter Stewart (footballer) (1875–1926), Australian footballer in Victorian Football League (VFL)
- Walter W. Stewart (1885–1958), American economist
- Walter W. Stewart (scientist) (born c. 1945), biomedical scientist at the National Institute of Health in Bethesda, Maryland
- Walter Stewart (journalist) (1931–2004), Canadian writer and educator
- Walter Stewart (15th-century priest) (fl. 1433–1471), archdeacon of St Andrews and bishop-elect of Dunblane
- Walter J. Stewart, American public servant

== See also ==
- Alfred Walter Stewart (1880–1947), British chemist and part-time novelist
