= Stuart Hall =

Stuart Hall may refer to:

== People ==
- Stuart Hall (presenter) (born 1929), British television and radio presenter
- Stuart Hall (cultural theorist) (1932–2014), Jamaican-born British cultural theorist and first editor of the New Left Review
- Stuart Hall (boxer) (born 1980), British bantamweight champion in 2010
- Stuart Hall (racing driver) (born 1984), British racing driver

== Other uses ==
- Stuart Hall Building, Kansas City, Missouri
- Stuart Hall High School, boys' school in San Francisco, California
- Stuart Hall School, private girls' boarding/co-ed day student school in Staunton, Virginia
- Stuart Hall, County Tyrone, a former stately home and contemporary townland in County Tyrone, Northern Ireland

== See also ==
- Stewart Hall (disambiguation)
