= Louis Stewart =

Louis Stewart may refer to:

- Lou Stewart (1915–2002), labor leader in Washington
- Louis Stewart (guitarist) (1944–2016), Irish jazz guitarist
- Louis Beaufort Stewart (1861–1937), Canadian astronomer, civil engineer and academic
