= Anthony Stuart =

Anthony Stuart may refer to:

- Anthony Stuart (boxer) (1907–74), English boxer
- Anthony Stuart (cricketer) (born 1970), Australian cricketer
- Anthony Stuart (politician), Antiguan politician

== See also ==
- Anthony Stewart (disambiguation)
- Stuart (name)
