= Stuart McDonald =

Stuart McDonald may refer to:

- Stuart McDonald (cartoonist) (1931–2021), American cartoonist for the Grand Forks Herald and politician
- Stuart McDonald (Australian politician) (1928–2017), leader of the National Party in the Victorian Legislative Council
- Stuart McDonald (Scottish politician) (born 1978), Scottish MP for Cumbernauld, Kilsyth and Kirkintilloch East

== See also ==
- Stewart McDonald (disambiguation)
