= Ray Stewart =

Ray Stewart may refer to:

- Ray Stewart (sprinter) (born 1965), Jamaican athlete
- Ray Stewart (Scottish footballer) (born 1959), Scottish international footballer
- Ray Stewart (Australian footballer) (1892–1966), Australian rules footballer
- Raymond Stewart (New Zealand cricketer) (born 1944), New Zealand cricketer
- Raymond Stewart (Jamaican cricketer) (born 1976), Jamaican cricketer
- Raymond Lee Stewart (1952–1996), American spree killer
- Ray Stewart (hurdler) (born 1989), American hurdler, All-American for the California Golden Bears track and field team
