= Eddie Mae Steward =

American civil rights activist

Eddie Mae Steward (1938–2000) was an American civil rights leader in Florida. She was the plaintiff in a school desegregation lawsuit against the Duval County School Board, which continued for decades. She served as president of the Jacksonville branch of the NAACP from 1972 to 1978, and was president of the statewide organization from 1973 to 1974.

In 1971, Ms. Steward allowed her children Jerry, Ervin, Angela, Alta, Carla and Venetia to be used as the plaintiffs in a lawsuit against the Duval County School Board. The lawsuit Mims v. Duval County School System made her a household name throughout the city due to forced busing that occur as a result.

Ms. Steward served as president of the Jacksonville NAACP from 1972-1978. During her three terms, she fought against racial discrimination in the police, fire department and city government. She organized numerous demonstration and boycotts against racial profiling of blacks by police. Under her leadership, the membership was increased to over 2,500 members, which made it the largest NAACP branch in the Southeastern region.

After not seeking reelection to the NAACP post, she served as a member of the Florida State Housing Council and Florida State Biracial monitoring Committee.

Ms. Steward ran unsuccessfully for the Jacksonville City Council twice and Florida State Senate.

Ms. Steward died in 2000 and is interred at Edgewood Cemetery in Jacksonville. A post office has been named in her honor.
