= Brad Steward =

Brad Steward is a former professional snowboarder and one of the first entrepreneurs in the industry. Brad made his mark in the industry by bringing snowboarding to the global stage. In the late 1980s Steward, alongside Craig Kelly, Tom Hsieh, Wiley Asher and Bud Fawcett became the first Americans to snowboard in Russia, in a seminal Soviet-Era visit to Gudari, located in what was then Soviet Georgia. Memorialized in both Warren Miller films and Craig Kelly's video ‘Board With The World’, this trip was seen as the starting point for a generation of wandering riders, searching the world for dangerous mountains. Steward and crew were forced to leave Gudari and the Tbilisi area in a Russian troop transport helicopter as a result of protests and conflict from the Tbilisi Massacre, where 21 deaths and hundreds of injuries took place. Kelly, who at that time was the 4-time World Champion of snowboarding, later died in an avalanche.

Steward traveled on many similar ‘firsts’ for the snowboard industry with trips to Riksgranssen, Sweden, Mt. Elbrus, Russia, Rusutsu, Hokkaido Japan, Las Lenas, Argentina, Astun and Candanchu in the Spanish Pyrenees, and many more. Mt. Elbrus was the most challenging of all these visits, when the crew of Dave England (MTV Jackass) Todd Franzen, Jay Nelson and Justin Hostynek (Absinthe Films) triggered a massive avalanche in the Russian backcountry, surviving the episode after an 8-hour hike out of the remote zone.

Steward attended film school in Santa Barbara, California at the Brooks Institute and graduated with a degree in communications from Northern Arizona University. Steward hosted television programs for ESPN, Prime Network and appeared on several early episodes of MTV Sports as either a guest host or instructor to the bands or program hosts. Steward began working for Sims in 1989 and became the marketing director by 1990. He then moved to the newly founded Morrow Snowboards in Salem, Oregon, to co-own the company and serve as Vice President. Morrow Snowboards was eventually sold to the Jarden Corp (K2).

While working with Sims and Morrow, Steward was in the process of developing his own company. In 1989, Steward created three unique t-shirts featuring the word "bonfire" enlarged in rough copy, directly from an old Sears brand typewriter. In the early stages, Steward called the company Bonfire Think Tank Designs. Steward's company – now called Bonfire Snowboarding was sold to Salomon Sports, which was then acquired by Adidas. During this time, Bonfire was one of the leading snowboard-apparel brands on the market, with offices in 39 Countries.

In 1998 Steward and Burton founder Jake Burton sued U.S. Skiing over the Olympic qualification process for snowboarders, which resulted in a settlement that produced the Grand Prix series for snowboarders to enter the Olympics. Steward later photographed the Nagano Olympics for Times Mirror Corp and Transworld Snowboarding.

In 2000 Steward left his active role at Bonfire to pursue his lifelong interest in film. He directed commercials, music videos and more, for U.S. and UK based clients ranging from Sony Records and the Cartoon Network (Powerpuff Girls, Space Ghost, Escalator Danger Squad) - winning an Addy Award from the American Federation of Advertising for his comedy commercial work, The Sniffer. In 2003 Brad returned to Bonfire to direct the brand from their office in Portland, Oregon.

In 2010 Steward lead the acquisition team for Amer Sports, in the purchase of Reykjavik, Iceland-based brand, Nikita. In 2011 Steward created and lead the team at Amer Sports in Design and Development of digitally enabled apparel, working between homes in Geneva, Switzerland and Lake Oswego, Oregon.

In 2015 Steward co-created Caravan Outpost, based in Ojai, California. Caravan Outpost is an lodging company. The Outpost has been featured in ABC's The Bachelor, television show and was recently named the ‘Best Place To Stay’ in Ojai, by Forbes Magazine.

Brad Steward is a frequent motivational speaker on entrepreneurial skills, digital and big data and economic development. His speeches range from Keynote at the Oregon Economic Development Pub Talk series in Central Oregon, to the Global Sports Management Summit; where Brad was a featured speaker to NFL, NBA and MLB owners.

Steward and his Wife Shawn have 5 children and currently reside in Ojai, California.
