= Stewart Dunsker =

American neurologist and professor (born 1934)

- Born: Stewart B. Dunsker; August 12, 1934; Cincinnati, Ohio, United States
- Education: University of Cincinnati; Harvard College
- Occupations: Surgeon; Neurosurgeon
- Employer(s): University of Cincinnati; Washington University in St. Louis

Stewart Dunsker is a neurosurgeon and professor emeritus at University of Cincinnati College of Medicine.

== Education ==
Dunsker is from Cincinnati, Ohio, where he was born on August 12, 1934. He earned an A.B (cum laude) from Harvard College in 1956. He studied at the University of Cincinnati College of Medicine, where he was given the Borden Award for Research in 1960. There followed an internship at the University of Illinois and a year of training in Internal Medicine at the University of Cincinnati. He served two years in the army and did a year of surgical training at the University of Cincinnati.

== Career ==
In 1965, Dunsker joined the neurosurgery program at Washington University School of Medicine, where he would remain for four years. In 1970, Dunsker joined the practice of Frank Henderson Mayfield. It would later become known as the Mayfield Clinic.

Dunsker's research interests have to do with spine disorders. A founding member of the Joint Section of Spinal Disorders of the America Association of Neurological Surgeons/Congress of Neurological Surgeons, he was the organization's Chairman in 1987.

Dunsker is a member of the American Association of Neurological Surgeons (Board of Directors, 1991–1994; Treasurer 1995–1998; Vice President 1998–1999; President 2000–2001); the American Board of Neurological Surgery (Board of Directors, 1994–1999; Vice Chair 1999); the American Academy of Neurological Surgery (Vice President, 1990); the Congress of Neurological Surgeons (Executive Committee 1980); the Society of University Neurosurgeons (President 1980); the Ohio State Medical Society (President, 1983); the Ohio State Neurosurgical Society (President, 1981); the American Medical Association (Delegate, 1976–1986); and the American College of Surgeons.

== Accomplishments and awards ==
Neurosurgeon of the Year, Ohio State Neurosurgical Society (1992). Meritorious Service Award, AANS/CNS Section on Disorders of the Spine (2001). Harvey Cushing Medal, the highest honor of the AANS (2002).

The Ellen and Stewart B. Dunsker, MD, Award for Clinical Research was established in 2007 to spur clinical research among neurosurgical residents in the department of neurosurgery.

== Miscellany ==
Dunsker is married to the former Ellen Lothian Treiman. She is a librarian. They have a daughter.

== Notable publications ==
- Onik, Gary; Mooney, Vert; Maroon, Joseph C.; Wiltse, Leon; Helms, Clyde; Schweigel, Joseph; Watkins, Robert; Kahanovitz, Neil; Day, Arthur; Morris, James; McCullough, John A.; Reicher, Murray; Croissant, Paul; Dunsker, Stewart; Davis, William G.; Brown, Courtney; Hochschuler, Stephen; Saul, Thomas; Ray, Charles (1 Jan 1990). "Automated Percutaneous Discectomy: A Prospective Multi-Institutional Study". Neurosurgery. 26 (2): 228–233. doi:10.1227/00006123-199002000-00007. ISSN 0148-396X. PMID 2407968.
- Bindal, Ajay K.; Dunsker, Stewart B.; Tew, John M. (1 Nov 1995). "Chiari I Malformation: Classification and Management". Neurosurgery. 37 (6): 1069–1074. doi:10.1227/00006123-199512000-00005. ISSN 0148-396X. PMID 8584146.
- Keller, Jeffrey T.; Dunsker, Stewart B.; McWhorter, Joe M.; Ongkiko, Carlos M.; Saunders, Mary C.; Mayfield, Frank H. (1978). "The fate of autogenous grafts to the spinal dura". Journal of Neurosurgery. 49 (3). Journal of Neurosurgery Publishing Group (JNSPG): 412–418. doi:10.3171/jns.1978.49.3.0412. ISSN 0022-3085. PMID 682003. S2CID 40662915.
- Dunsker, SB (1977). "Anterior cervical discectomy with and without fusion". Clinical Neurosurgery. 24: 516–521. doi:10.1093/neurosurgery/24.CN_suppl_1.516. ISSN 0069-4827. PMID 583696.
- Colley, David P.; Dunsker, Stewart B. (1978). "Traumatic Narrowing of the Dorsolumbar Spinal Canal Demonstrated by Computed Tomography". Radiology. 129 (1). Radiological Society of North America (RSNA): 95–98. doi:10.1148/129.1.95. ISSN 0033-8419. PMID 693906.
