= Dennis Stewart =

Dennis Stewart may refer to:

- Dennis Stewart (basketball) (1947–2022), American professional basketball player
- Dennis Stewart (judoka) (born 1960), British judoka
- Dennis Cleveland Stewart (1947–1994), American actor and dancer
- Dennis Stewart (runner), winner of the 1970 4 × 880 yard relay at the NCAA Division I Indoor Track and Field Championships
