= Patrick Stewart (disambiguation) =

Patrick Stewart (1940–2026) was an English film, television and stage actor.

Patrick Stewart may also refer to:

- Patrick Stewart, 2nd Earl of Orkney (c. 1566–1615), executed for treason
- Patrick Dana Stewart (1970–2005), American soldier and practicing Wiccan whose religion caused a burial controversy after his death
- Patrick Maxwell Stewart (1795–1846), London merchant and Whig MP
- Patrick Shaw-Stewart (1888–1917), scholar and poet remembered for his poem Achilles in the Trench

== See also ==
- Patrick Stuart (disambiguation)
