= Anthony Stewart =

Anthony Stewart may refer to:

- A. T. Q. Stewart (Anthony Terence Quincey Stewart, 1929–2010), academic historian and author from Northern Ireland
- Anthony Stewart (ice hockey) (born 1985), ice hockey player
- Anthony Stewart (footballer) (born 1992), English footballer
- Anthony Stewart (rugby league) (born 1979), Irish rugby league player
- Anthony Stewart (basketball player) (born 1970), Australian basketball player
- Anthony Stewart (basketball coach) (1970–2020), American college basketball coach
- B. Anthony Stewart (1904–1977), American photographer
- Anthony Stewart (businessman), owner of the ship Peggy Stewart, burned in the "Annapolis Tea Party", 1774

== See also ==
- Anthony Stuart (disambiguation)
- Tony Stewart (disambiguation)
