= Stanley Stewart (disambiguation) =

Stanley Stewart is a British writer.

Stanley Stewart may also refer to:

- Stanley Stewart Davis, British academic
- Stanley Toft Stewart (1910–1992), Singaporean civil servant
- Stanley Stewart, alter ego of the Marvel Comics character Whizzer
