= Steven Stewart =

Steven, Stephen or Steve Stewart may refer to:

- Steven Stewart (wrestler), known as Bart Sawyer
- Stephen Stewart (basketball)
- Stephen Stewart (rower)
- Stephen Stewart (judge)
- Steve Stewart (American football)
