= Jane Stewart =

Jane Stewart may refer to:

- Jane Stewart (politician) (born 1955), former Canadian politician
- Jane Stewart (scientist), English neuroscientist
- Jane Stewart (executive) (1917–1990), American public relations executive
- Jane Stewart, Countess of Galloway, Scottish countess
- Jane Agnes Stewart, American author and editor
- Jane Catherine Shaw Stewart, British nurse in the Crimea

== See also ==
- Jane Stuart, American painter
