= Daniel Stewart =

Daniel Stewart may refer to:

== Politicians ==
- Dan Stewart (politician) (born 1963), American politician
- Daniel Stewart (politician) (born 1962), first openly gay elected mayor in New York State history
- Daniel Stewart (brigadier general) (1761–1829), American politician and brigadier general

== Others ==
- Daniel Stewart (Australian footballer) (1988–2026), Australian rules footballer
- Daniël Stewart, co-composed Tiesto's "UR/A Tear in the Open"
- Dan Stewart (As the World Turns) (1958–1979), a fictional character on the soap opera As the World Turns
- Daniel Stewart's College
- Daniel Stewart (born 1967), English actor, son of actor Patrick Stewart
- I. Daniel Stewart (1933–2005), Utah judge
- Daniel David Stewart, American singer and television and theatre actor

== See also ==
- Daniel Stuart (1766–1846), Scottish journalist
