= Amy Stewart =

Amy Stewart may refer to:

- Amy Stewart (writer), American author who writes about horticulture and the natural world
- Amii Stewart (born Amy Stewart in 1956), American disco/soul/dance-pop singer
- Amy Stewart (American actress) (born 1972), appeared in Wild Iris (film)
- Amy Stewart (Canadian actress), appeared in Ice Princess, The Boys Club and Lost and Delirious
