= Stewart Hall =

Stewart Hall may refer to:

== Buildings ==
- Stewart Hall (Morgantown, West Virginia), listed on the National Register of Historic Places in Monongalia County, West Virginia
- Stewart Hall (Pointe-Claire), a historic house and cultural centre in Pointe-Claire, Quebec

== People ==
- Stewart Hall (football coach) (born 1959), association football coach

== See also ==
- Stuart Hall (disambiguation)
