= Cam Stewart =

Cam Stewart may refer to:

- Cam Stewart (ice hockey)
- Cam Stewart (sportscaster)

== See also ==
- Cameron Stewart (disambiguation)
