= Ryrie Rock =

Isolated rock off the Antarctic coast

Geography
- Location: Mac. Robertson Land, Antarctica

Geology
- Mountain type: Isolated rock

Ryrie Rock (67°3′S 61°27′E) is an isolated rock off the coast, 20 kilometres (11 nmi) northeast of Kidson Island and 48 kilometres (26 nmi) northeast of Byrd Head. Discovered in February 1931 by the British Australian New Zealand Antarctic Research Expedition (BANZARE) under Mawson, who named it for the Australian High Commissioner in London at the time, Granville Ryrie.
