= Stewart H. Jones =

American attorney (1909–1976)

United States Attorney for the District of Connecticut
- In office 1969–1974
- President: Richard Nixon
- Preceded by: Jon O. Newman
- Succeeded by: Harold J. Pickerstein

Personal details
- Born: c. 1909
- Died: March 16, 1976 (aged 66–67) Greenwich, Connecticut, U.S.
- Spouse: Margaret Jones
- Education: Yale University (BA), Yale Law School (JD)
- Profession: Attorney

Military service
- Allegiance: United States
- Branch/service: United States Air Force
- Years of service: World War II

Stewart H. Jones (c. 1909 – March 16, 1976) was an American attorney who served as the United States Attorney for the District of Connecticut from 1969 to 1974 under President Richard Nixon.

== Early life and education ==
Jones attended Ramsey Hall and the Hotchkiss School before graduating from Yale University in 1930 and Yale Law School in 1933. He later served in the United States Army Air Force during World War II.

== Legal career ==
After the war, Jones established a law practice in Greenwich, Connecticut. In 1958, he was appointed Assistant Town Counsel, and the following year, he became Town Counsel. His legal career took a prominent turn when Senator Lowell P. Weicker Jr. recommended him for the position of U.S. Attorney for Connecticut in 1969. He was subsequently appointed by Richard Nixon.

In 1973, near the end of his term, Jones suffered a stroke. Though his tenure officially ended in 1974, he remained in the position while waiting for a replacement. His Chief Assistant, Harold J. Pickerstein, served as Acting U.S. Attorney following Jones's health issues.

== Later years and death ==
Jones died on March 16, 1976, at the age of 66, after complications from his 1973 stroke. He lived with his wife, Margaret, in Greenwich, Connecticut. A man of many interests, he co-founded the Karate Institute of Greenwich and was a collector of Japanese stoneware.

Political offices
Preceded by Jon O. Newman	United States Attorney for the District of Connecticut; 1969–1974	Succeeded by Harold J. Pickerstein
