= Ryan Stewart =

Ryan Stewart may refer to:

- Ryan Stewart (American football) (born 1973), former American football safety
- Ryan Stewart (ice hockey) (born 1967), former ice hockey player
- Ryan Stewart (footballer, born 1982), Trinidadian footballer
- Ryan Stewart (footballer, born 1985), Northern Irish footballer and manager
- Ryan Stewart (footballer, born 1993), Scottish footballer
- Ryan Stewart (songwriter), Canadian songwriter and producer
- Ryan Stewart, a character portrayed by Jesse Plemons in the television series Cold Case

== See also ==
- Ryan Stewart Gauld
- Ryhan Stewart
- Ryan Stuart
- Ryan Stuart Clayton Inniss
