= Walter Travis Stewart =

American combat veteran

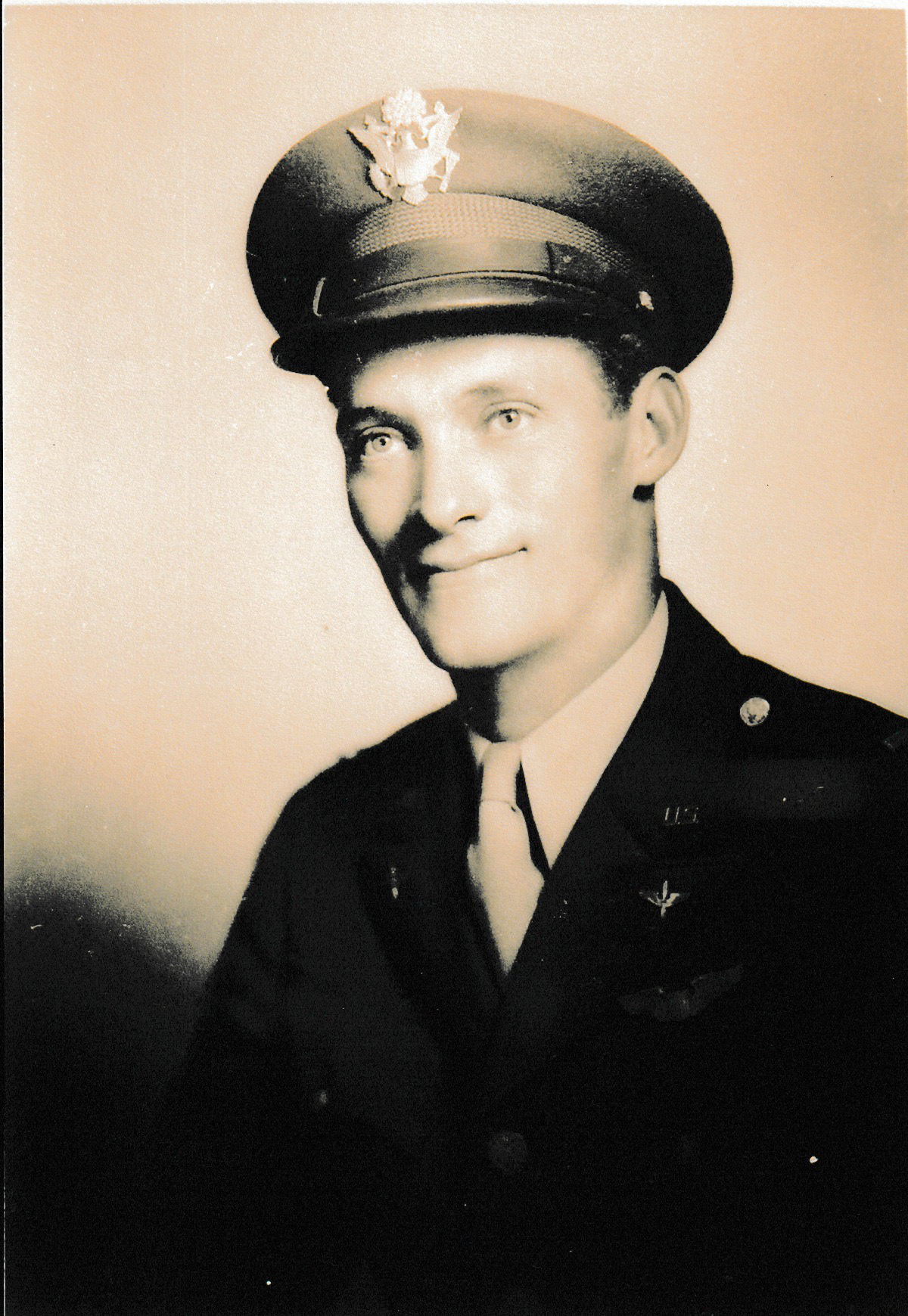
A portrait of Walter Stewart

Walter Travis Stewart (November 8, 1917 – January 9, 2016) was an American combat veteran who served as a pilot in the United States Army Air Force in WW2. He is best known for the role he played in Operation Tidal Wave, a low-level bombing mission to the oilfields of Ploiești, Romania, which was the 31st of 32 combat missions Stewart would fly during the war. After completing a war-bonds tour back home and his 32nd combat mission, Stewart transitioned to the Reserves where he continued to fly for the remainder of his 36-year career, retiring at the rank of colonel.

Stewart began training as a pilot at Victorville, California, in 1941. He entered the war with the 93rd Bomb Group stationed in Hardwick, England and flew 18 missions while stationed there. Stewart was then assigned his own plane that he named UTAH MAN after the University of Utah fight song which he had attended. From an airfield in Benghazi, Libya he continued to fly combat missions over Italy, culminating in Operation Tidal Wave.

After the war, Stewart worked in general contracting, taught religious institute, and served two missions for Church of Jesus Christ of Latter-Day Saints.

Stewart was featured in the PBS documentary "A Wing and a Prayer".

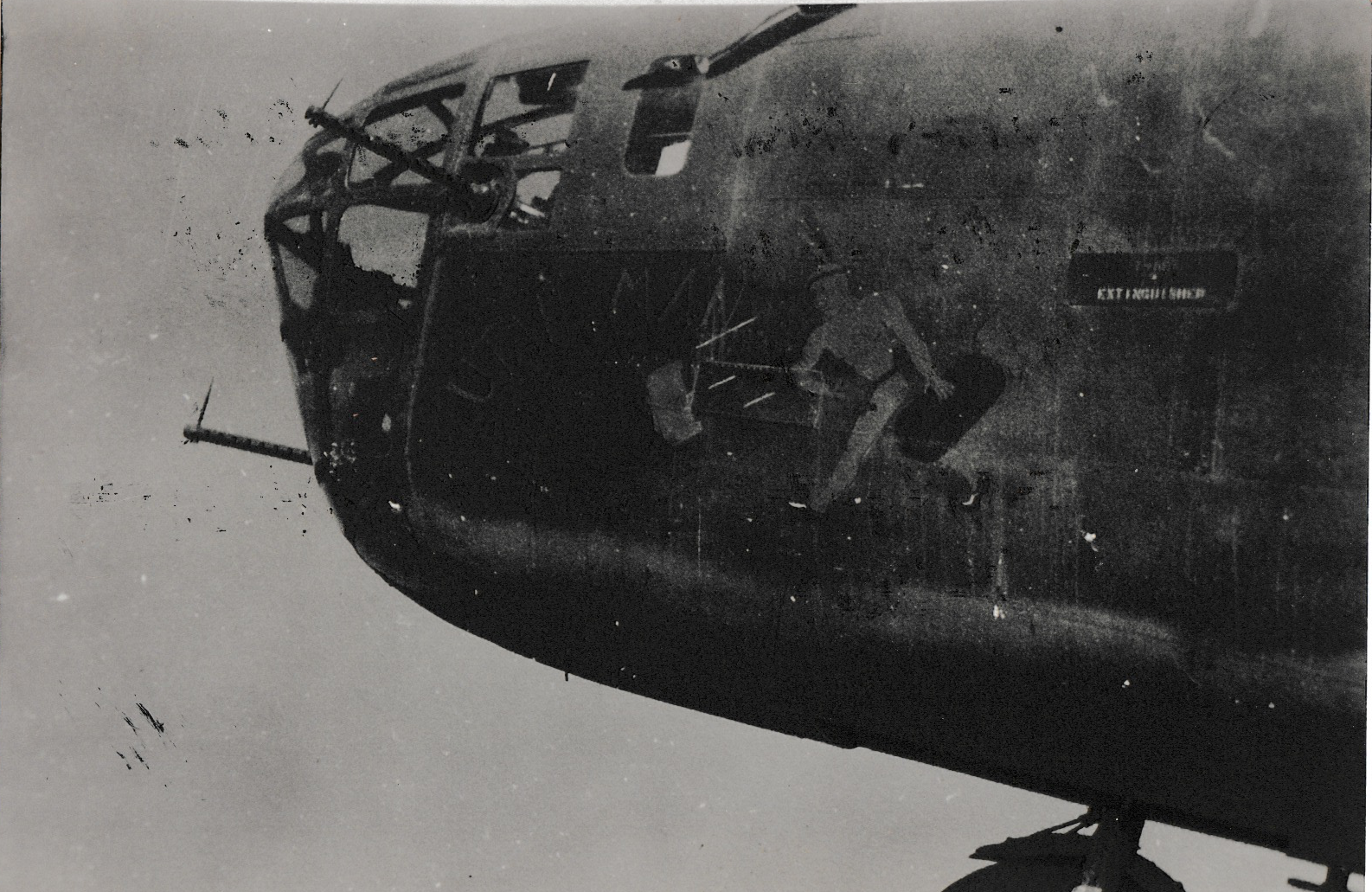
Photo of the Utah man taken by Walter Stewart

== Early life, family and education ==
Walter Travis Stewart was born on November 8, 1917, in Benjamin, Utah where he spent most of his life. His parents are Otto Ren and Millicent Tollstrup Stewart. He was the tenth of twelve children. He grew up as a member of The Church of Jesus Christ of Latter-Day Saints and continued in that faith for the entirety of his life. He attended school in both Provo, Utah, and Salt Lake City, graduating from South High School (Utah) in 1935. He continued his education at the University of Utah where he graduated with a Bachelor's and a Law Degree. His education was interrupted when he chose to serve a mission for his church. Stewart was assigned to serve in Scotland in 1937, but when World War II broke out in Europe he was sent back to the United States to finish his service in the Eastern States Mission in West Virginia. He married Ruth Francis at 27 on December 14, 1944, in the Salt Lake Temple.

== Military service ==
Stewart had a desire to serve in the war effort. His religious community, which was a major part of Stewart's life, also began to endorse service in the military as the only way to ensure a lasting peace between nations. In 1941 as an Army Air Force Cadet at the University of Utah, Stewart wrote,

"We were pulling guns around with horses as a plane flew overhead. Jack Adamson, who had been my Mormon mission companion, said to me, "There's a war coming." Later that year, I was one of the first flying cadets in Ontario, California." Stewart had decided that he would serve in this war in an airplane.

He began training as a pilot in Victorville, California, graduating in 1941 to report to the 93rd bombing group in Hardwick, England. While in England, Stewart flew 18 combat missions as a copilot for the "greatest friend of his life" Hugh Rawlin Roper. Lt. Stewart was quickly assigned his own aircraft to pilot which he dubbed, UTAH MAN after the University of Utah fight song.

=== Allied Bombing Strategy 1941–1943 ===
The United States Army Air Force was the only service to champion daylight precision bombing. Despite advancements such as the coveted Norden Bomb Sight, in 1941, it was typical for bombs dropped from 20,000 feet to have a 1.2% chance of hitting a 100-square-foot target. In 1943 only 16% of American bombs could be reliably dropped within 1000 ft of a target. This, combined with the low yields of ordnance used called for large forces of bombers to be deployed over a target area to improve chances of target destruction.

It was assumed at the beginning of the war that fighters would be unable to intercept strategic bombers: this was quickly proven false. German fighters and anti-air emplacements wreaked havoc on Allied bombers, leading to roughly an 8% bomber attrition rate per mission. On a 25-mission combat tour- the odds were grim.

=== Benghazi, Libya 1943 ===
Lt. Stewart and the Utah Man flew multiple missions over Italy, leading to Stewart extending his combat tour past the typical 25 missions. Italy was poorly defended compared to the German heartland and bombing crews encountered little resistance on raids. There was, however, a larger plan in the works.

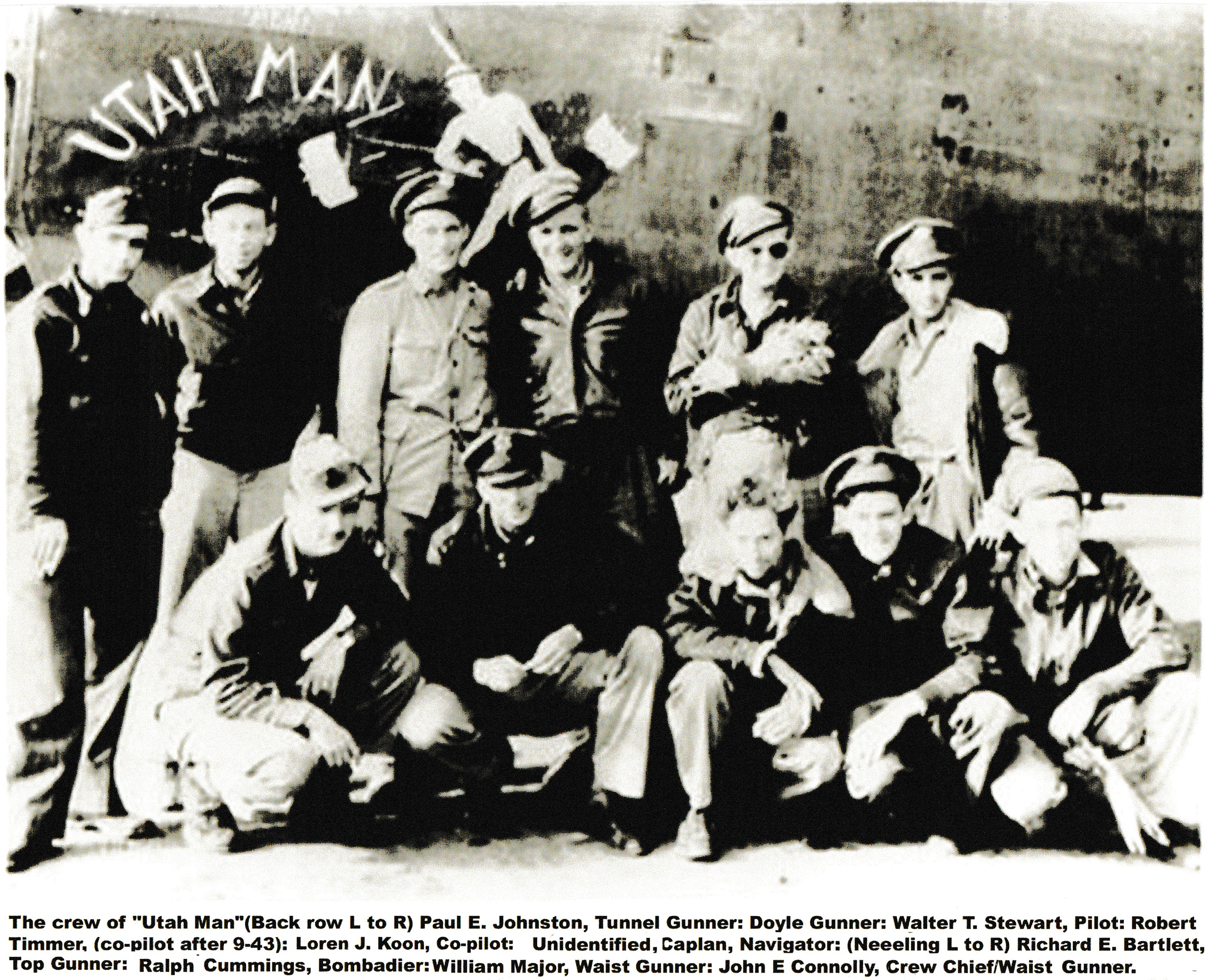
The crew of the Utah man (1943)

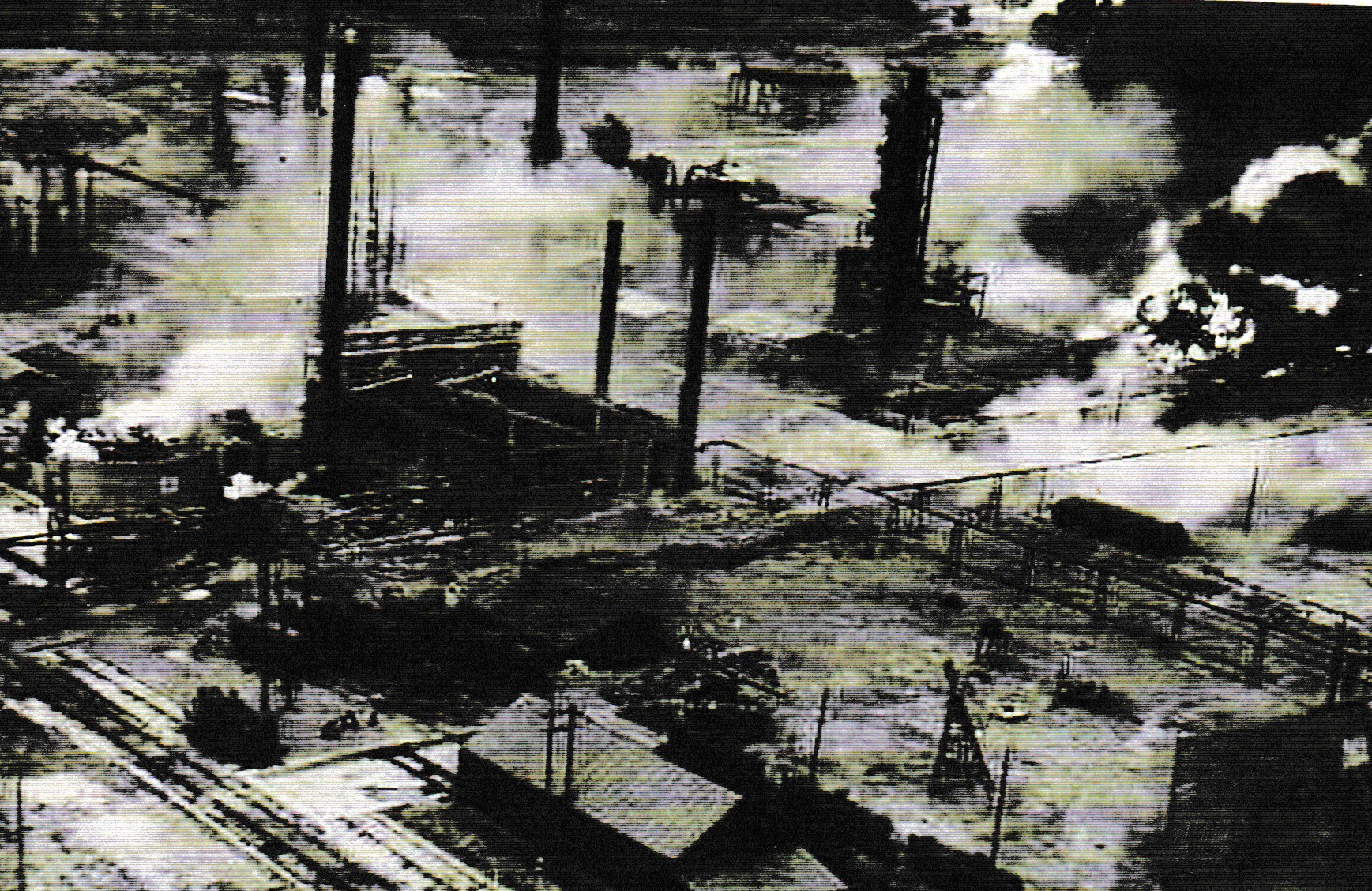
Aerial photograph of Ploiești, Romania, during Operation Tidal Wave

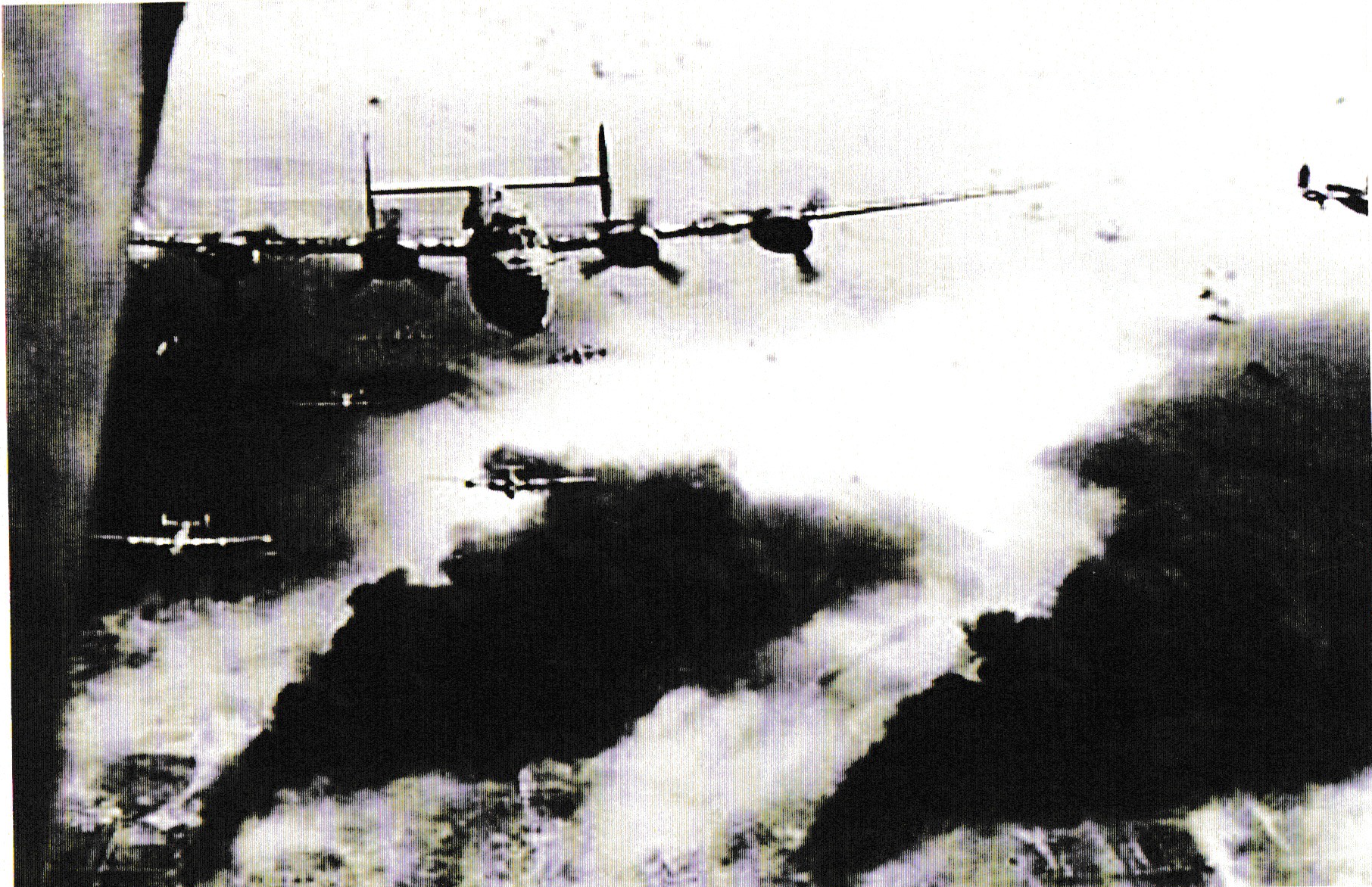
Scan of a photo taken from a B-29 on a mission

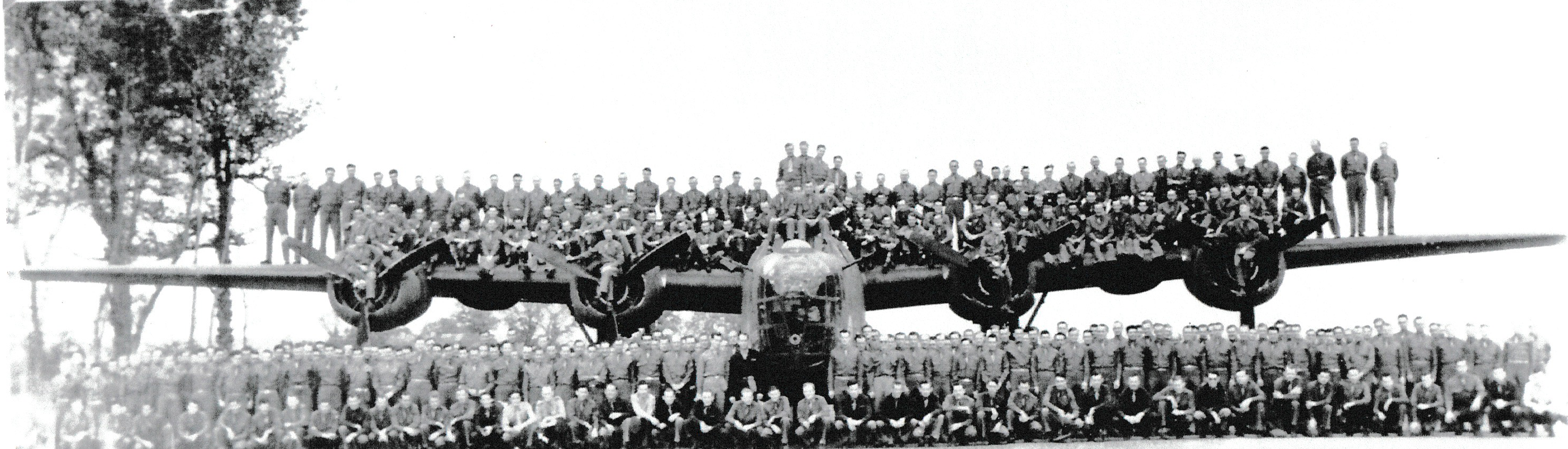
A photo of the 93rd bomb group likely taken in Libya

=== Romanian oil ===
Romania entered the war in June 1941, aligning with the Axis powers and hoping to regain the territory it had lost to the Soviets. Essential to the Axis powers was Romanian oil which supplied roughly 60% of the Wehrmacht's needs, made all the more important by the failed 1942 German offensive to seize Soviet oil in the Caucasus. This crucial support did not go unnoticed by Allied planners.

=== Operation TIDAL WAVE ===
Operation TIDAL WAVE was intended to cripple Romanian oil production centered on the city of Ploiești. The raid would be conducted at 200-800 feet rather than at typical high altitudes. With low drop heights and the element of surprise, Colonel Jacob Smart (leading the mission) expected dramatic results.

The Germans, having deciphered American transmissions, prepared a trap: they encircled Ploiești with anti-aircraft guns, emplaced barrage balloons and smoke generators and had squadrons of German, Bulgarian, and Romanian fighters on stand-by.

On Sunday, August 1, 1943, Lt. Stewart flew the 1200 miles from Banghazi as deputy leader of the 93rd bomb group. The formation became separated in poor weather over Bulgaria and navigation was disrupted as the lead navigator aircraft was short down en route. As the bombers progressed toward Romania, inexplicably, the formation's commander Gen. Uzal Ent turned the formation away from Ploiești and directed the bombers towards Bucharest at the last navigation waypoint before the bombing run was to take place- plunging the plan into chaos. Making a snap decision in radio silence: Stewart's group leader, Col. Addison Baker chose to break from formation and lead his group through the heaviest German defenses in the South rather than circle around Ploiești and attack from the lightly defended North-East. Stewart recalled,

"Our leaders, including Col. Baker, told us that if we didn't bomb Ploesti on that day, we'd have to return to do it another day. And the Germans would be even more prepared for us the next time." "When I saw Col. Baker and his copilot, Major John Jerstad, turn HELL'S WENCH into the target, instead of following Col. Compton and Gen Ent, I thought it was one of the greatest acts of bravery I have ever witnessed. We were only ten minutes ahead of the enemy. Col. Baker had told us he was going over the target if he had to go over in flames, and he did just that."

Flying through German flak, Col. Baker's HELL'S WENCH was shot down with no survivors. Stewart assumed command of the group for their bombing run over the refinery. UTAH MAN dropped three bombs on targets of opportunity in their bombing run while the crew manually dropped another three bombs that failed to release. Unfortunately, the confusion of the raid now set Stewart's formation on a collision course with the 98th bombing group led by Col. John Kane approaching from the North. There were no collisions, but the bombers over Ploiești still had to deal with enemy flak, fighters and balloons as well as the inferno of the Refinery burning and the delay-fuzed bombs dropped by their allies.

Stewart had to fly low to stay out of enemy flak. To avoid a tall radio tower and its anchoring guy wires he rolled his aircraft to miss the obstacle. UTAH MAN took flak to a fuel tank, the damage forced Stewart to reduce airspeed on the return flight- nearly running out of fuel. UTAH MAN made it back to base hours after the other bombers had landed, safe, but riddled with 365 holes. Stewart would fly one more combat mission before returning home.

==== Aftermath ====
Operation TIDAL WAVE had a massive cost of both materiel and human life with 54 aircraft shot down, 310 airmen killed, 130 wounded and 100 captured. At the time the mission was seen as only a partial success: though three of five refineries destroyed they were quickly repaired and within months had increased production. It is recognized now, however, that Operation TIDAL WAVE was much more pivotal than previously realized and was the event that caused Hitler to turn away his invasion of the Soviet Union when American forces attacked his greatest source of crude oil.

== Later life ==
Following his service in the Air Force, Stewart pursued a career in construction. He was a general contractor from the time of his graduation until the year 1962. The Church of Jesus Christ of Latter-Day Saints called his family to move across the world to build new chapels for the church. He was assigned to Norwich, England and Flensburg, Germany in the years 1962-1966.

Upon returning home, Stewart finished his career as a seminary and institute teacher until he retired in 1985. After his retirement, Stewart and his wife went on to serve two more missions for their church. The first being in Ghana, Africa (1987-88) and the second in Sierra Leone (1990-91). This made for a total of 5 missions for The Church of Jesus Christ of Latter-Day Saints that Stewart completed.

The couple returned home and spent their time running their farm in Benjamin, Utah and visiting their 29 grand-children.

== Death ==
Walter Travis Stewart died on January 8, 2016, at the age of 98, on the day of his oldest son's funeral. He was buried in the cemetery in Benjamin, Utah, on January 16, 2016.

== Medals and decorations ==
Among other decorations; Stewart was awarded the Distinguished Service Cross, the Silver Star; the Distinguished Flying Cross; and the Air Medal with 4 Oak Leaf Clusters.
