= Corey Stewart (disambiguation) =

Corey Stewart (born 1968) is an American politician.

Corey Stewart may also refer to:

- Corey Stewart (rugby league) (born 1971), Australian rugby league player active 1990–1993

== See also ==
- Corey Stuart, a fictional character from Lassie
