= Scott Stewart =

Scott Stewart may refer to:

- Scott Stewart (baseball) (born 1975), pitcher in Major League Baseball
- Scott Stewart (director), American film director, writer, producer and visual effects developer
- Scott Stewart (footballer) (born 1996), Scottish footballer
- Scott Stewart (politician), Australian politician
- Scott Stewart (rugby union) (born 1969), Canadian rugby player
- Scott G. Stewart, American lawyer serving as the Solicitor General of Mississippi
