= Reginald Stewart =

Reginald Stewart may refer to:

- Reg Stewart (Australian footballer) (1878–1952), Australian rules footballer
- Reginald Stewart (conductor), American conductor of Baltimore Symphony Orchestra in 1950s
- Reg Stewart (footballer, born 1925) (1925–2011), English footballer
- Reginald Harcourt Stewart, commissioner of police in Aden, got Queen's Police Medal as part of 1957 Birthday Honours
- Reginald W. Stewart, pilot of Air Canada Flight 189 which crashed in 1978
