= Rena Stewart =

Scottish World War II codebreaker and journalist

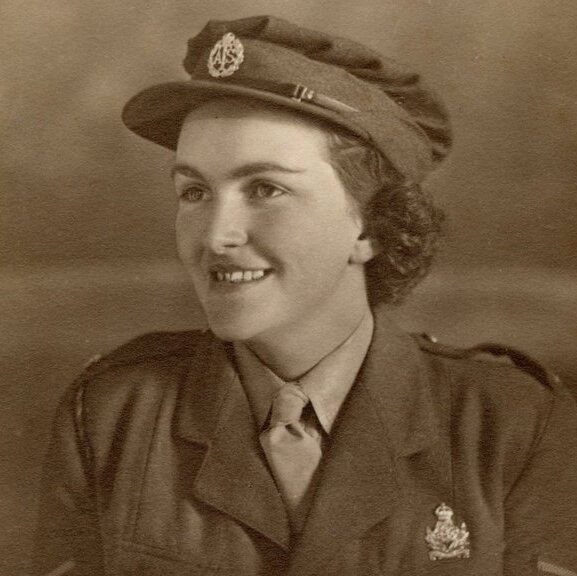
- Born: 17 February 1923; Lundin Links, Fife
- Died: 11 November 2023 (aged 100)
- Known for: World War II codebreaker at Bletchley Park, translated Adolf Hitler’s will. First woman Senior Duty Editor at the BBC World Service.

Rena Stewart (17 February 1923 - 11 November 2023) was a World War II codebreaker at Bletchley Park who later translated Adolf Hitler's will. She became a journalist, and the first woman Senior Duty Editor at the BBC World Service.

== Early life and education ==
Rena Robertson Stewart was born on 17 February 1923 in Lundin Links in Fife to Andrewina (née Williamson) and Thomas Stewart. Her father worked for a bank and she had a sister, Isobel. In 1940, she went to the University of St Andrews, studying French and German, graduating in 1943.

== Second World War ==
Stewart volunteered to join the Auxiliary Territorial Service during the Second World War. In 1944 her linguistic abilities, particularly in German, led to her posting to Bletchley Park as part of the code breaking staff. She worked in what was known as Bletchley's German book room, where she deciphered German army and air force messages that were collated in book form to provide reference documents for long-term intelligence analysis.

Stewart collaborated with two colleagues, Elma Morley and Margery Forbes to figure out what the missing content was in partially intercepted messages. Sometimes these involved communications between the Nazi high command.

Stewart was deployed to the Bad Nenndorf interrogation centre, part of the Combined Services Detailed Interrogation Centre in Germany following the end of the war, rising to the rank of sergeant. Based in Bad Nenndorf she was part of the teams interrogating German intelligence officers imprisoned after the fall of the Reich. Her language skills were pressed into service translating prisoner interrogations from German into English. The most important document Stewart worked on was translating Hitler's will with her friend and colleague Margery Forbes, also an alumna of St Andrews. The original document was typed by Traudl Junge in the Führerbunker the day before Hitler's suicide. Stewart and Forbes were encouraged by Major Bill Oughton to take their time to ensure the translation as “absolutely perfect.” They deliberated over the phrase “kleinen bürgerlichen” life which Hitler had stipulated that Martin Bormann, his personal secretary and named executor of the will should be allowed to lead.

They eventually decided the correct phrase was ‘petit bourgeois’ life and Stewart was pleased to discover in 1947 that Hugh Trevor-Roper used her translation in his seminal book, The Last Days of Hitler.

== Postwar and the BBC ==
In 1947, Stewart was demobbed. Due to the secret nature of her wartime work, she could not disclose what she had accomplished in her work during the war to potential employers. She eventually joined the BBC's German Service, translating Ibsen and Shakespeare plays for actors who had fled Germany for Britain and now recorded programmes for broadcast to occupied Germany.

Stewart's ambition was to become a journalist, and she transferred to BBC Monitoring Service, in Caversham Park, Berkshire, monitoring Radio Moscow’s English language service. The Monitoring Service reported to the BBC but also provided potential intelligence from this monitoring to the UK government, and the American CIA.

Stewart was determined to get a purely journalistic job at the BBC World Service and after a decade at Caversham and numerous applications to the BBC newsroom, she was appointed as a subeditor at Bush House in London. She met considerable sexism from the management of the newsroom but was not put off. At one editorial meeting Stewart was the only woman in the room and when the assembled staff were greeted with "Good morning, gentlemen" by the editor, she replied "Ken, I'm not a gentleman", so he reframed the greeting as "Good morning, gentlemen and Rena".

Eventually, management changed and a different newsroom editor suggested that she apply for the role of chief subeditor. After this, Stewart was promoted through a number of roles eventually becoming senior duty editor, the first woman to hold that role in the World Service.

== Later life ==
Stewart retired in 1983, and led an active cultural life, including theatre and opera. She was an active elder in the congregation of St Andrew's United Reformed Church in Ealing, west London, running a Scottish country dancing group, organising a yearly Burns Night dinner and editing the church magazine. She appeared on Songs of Praise in a programme commemorating the 75th anniversary of D Day and was interviewed about her wartime experiences by the BBC's Witness History programme in 2013.

One unusual meeting was with Margery Tarwinska's (born Forbes) family including her daughter Rena Tarwinska. Rena Tarwinska was named after her but she and her family had never heard of Rena or the role that her Margery had played during the war. Margery had died in 1973 after only telling her family that her job during the war was secret. Rena Stewart was able to show them photographs and tell them of the role that she and her lifelong friend had played during the war.

Rena Stewart died on 11 November 2023 at the age of 100.
