= Carl Stewart =

Carl Stewart may refer to:

- Carl E. Stewart (born 1950), American judge
- Carl Stewart (American football) (born 1985), American football fullback
- Carl Stewart (footballer) (born 1997), English footballer
- Carl J. Stewart Jr. (1936–2025), member of the North Carolina House of Representatives
