= Stewart Ford =

British businessman (born 1964)

- Born: Stewart Owen Ford; 1964 (age 61–62)
- Occupations: Founder and CEO, Keydata

Stewart Owen Ford (born 1964) is a British businessman, the founder and chief executive (CEO) of the failed financial company Keydata Investment Services. He was fined a record £76 million by the Financial Conduct Authority in January 2019.

== Early life ==
Stewart Owen Ford was born in 1964. He lived in Edinburgh until he was 17.

== Career ==
Ford studied printing in London when he was 20. Afterwards, he went back to Edinburgh and started in business for himself. He had a career as a printer, publisher and then a financial services entrepreneur.

On 26 May 2015, it was announced that Ford had been fined a record £75 million by the Financial Conduct Authority (FCA). The FCA fine is in connection with the alleged mis-selling of £475 million of "death bonds", wrongly encouraging buyers to believe that they were entitled to tax-free ISAs. Ford is counter-suing the FCA for £370 million, claiming that the closure of Keydata was "politically motivated", that the company was a "highly successful" one with nearly £3 billion of assets under management, and that his reputation had suffered "grievous and irreparable" harm.

According to Ford, the one-day Upper Tribunal case management hearing for his challenge to the FCA's decision to fine him £75 million has been set for 23 September 2015.

The decision of the Upper Tribunal was handed down on 6 November 2018 with Judge Berner finding for the Respondent (the FCA) and accepting their request to increase the fine to £76 million.
