= Stewart McDonald =

Stewart McDonald may refer to:

- Stewart McDonald (water skier) (1925–2008)
- Stewart McDonald (politician) (born 1986), Scottish MP for Glasgow South

== See also ==
- Stuart McDonald (disambiguation)
