= Isabel Stewart Way =

American writer (1904–1978)

- Born: August 2, 1904; Muskegon, Michigan, US
- Died: September 11, 1978 (aged 74); Los Angeles, California, US
- Education: Jennings Seminary, Albion College
- Occupation: Writer
- Spouse(s): Winfield Scott Way; David J.-P. Bonnard; Charles Heber Clayton; Thomas Barclay Thomson
- Writing career
- Period: 1920s–1970s
- Genres: Short story, novels, pulp romance
- Notable work: Seed of the Land (1935)
- Notable awards: First prize, best story published in The Echo (1927)

Isabel E. Stewart Way (August 2, 1904 – September 23, 1978) was an American writer based in Azusa, California. Her first novel was Seed of the Land (1935). She was also a playwright and wrote hundreds of pulp genre stories and novels, especially Westerns and romances.

== Early life and education ==
Isabel Stewart Way was born in Muskegon, Michigan, the daughter of Harlow Auburn Stewart and Alice Brown Stewart. Her father was a piano salesman. She graduated from Jennings Seminary in Aurora, Illinois, and spent two years at Albion College in Michigan, before she withdrew from school to seek treatment for tuberculosis in warmer states.

== Career ==
Way was president of the Monrovia Writers League, and a member of the San Diego Writers' Club. She won the first prize for best story published in The Echo during 1927. In 1930 she reported on Krishnamurti's lectures at the Ojai Star Institute for the Monrovia News-Post. She was named associate editor of Creative World magazine in 1931. She also taught creative writing in Monrovia.

Way was also known as a dancer, actress, and playwright in Southern California. She was in the cast of the first show at the Repertory Theatre in Monrovia in 1931. She wrote a play, La Fiesta, that was performed in Los Angeles. She wrote another play with WInifred Davidson. In 1933, she accepted a contract to write radio scripts. Her play The Blossom of Hardcrabble Flats was produced in 1949, with her daughter Eve Bonnard in the cast.

== Publications ==
Way contributed numerous articles to Saturday Evening Post, The New Yorker and other publications. She published short stories in Brief Stories, Young's, Breezy Stories, Chatelaine, New York World, The Echo and others. In 1935, her farm novel Seed of the Land (1935) received strong positive reviews. She wrote many pulp romances with Western themes, including over a hundred stories for Rangeland Romances and Romantic Range, and a detective story for Detective Story. She also wrote pulp romance novels, often with medical themes, in her later years.

- "Important Things" (1931)
- "Rainy Day" (1931)
- Seed of the Land (1935)
- The Raiders of the Lost Canyon (1937)
- "The Devil Rides a Black Horse" (1938)
- "Mountain Fury" (1941, with Ruby Thomson)
- "Point of Honor" (1943, with Ruby Thomson)
- "By Kindness of Red" (1950)
- "The Five Beautiful Smith Sisters" (1953)
- Nurse in Love (1963)
- Nurse Christy (1968)
- Fleur Macabre (about 1968)
- The House on the Sky High Road (about 1970)
- Fighting Dr. Diana (1973)
- Calling Nurse Lorrie

== Personal life and legacy ==
Way married four times. She married her first husband, fellow writer Winfield Scott Way in 1921, in Florida. Scott Way, who was a founder of both the Pasadena Humane Society and the California Audubon Society, died in 1930. She married again in August 1932, to journalist David Jean-Phillip Bonnard; he was reported dead in Russia in December 1932. She had a daughter, Eve Bonnard. She married her third husband, Charles Heber Clayton, in 1940. In 1965 she married her fourth husband, Thomas Barclay Thomson, a fellow writer and retired postmaster, and widower of her co-author Ruby LaVerte Thomson. Way died in 1978, at the age of 73, in Los Angeles. Her papers are in the University of Oregon Libraries.
