= Adam Stewart =

Adam Stewart may refer to:

- Adam Steuart or Stewart, Scottish philosopher and controversialist
- Adam Stewart (business executive) (born 1981), Jamaican businessman
- Adam Stewart (cyclist) (born 1987), New Zealand track cyclist
