= Brian Stewart (phlebotomist) =

American criminal

- Born: October 30, 1966 (age 59); Columbia, Illinois, U.S.
- Occupation: Phlebotomist
- Status: Incarcerated
- Conviction: First degree assault
- Penalty: Life imprisonment

Brian T. Stewart (born October 30, 1966) is a former phlebotomist from Columbia, Illinois, who was convicted in December 1998 of injecting his son (born Brian Stewart Jr., now known as Brryan Jackson) with HIV-contaminated blood.

== First Degree Assault ==
On February 6, 1992, in St Joseph's Hospital West, in Lake St. Louis, Missouri, Stewart's 11-month-old son Brryan was being treated for asthma and pneumonia when he was infected with the virus. Stewart's wife contacted Stewart to inform him that their son was in the hospital. When he arrived, he sent her to the café to get a beverage. Stewart then injected tainted blood into his son. When she returned, Brryan was screaming in Stewart's arms. The tainted blood was incompatible with Brryan's. The boy was diagnosed with AIDS in 1996.

On April 22, 1998, Stewart was charged with first-degree assault; the county prosecutor stated that this was because first-degree assault results in a longer sentence than attempted murder.

Prosecutors stated that Stewart was a phlebotomist who had daily access to blood, and Stewart's co-workers testified that Stewart had previously made threats to harm people using contaminated blood when he was angry. The motive behind the crime was Stewart's desire to avoid paying child support to the boy's mother.

A Missouri jury found Stewart guilty of first-degree assault on December 6, 1998. Stewart's attorney, Joe Murphy, said that "My client has maintained all along that he is innocent" and also claimed that "Mom made an allegation and everyone ran with it."

On January 9, 1999, Stewart was sentenced to life imprisonment at St. Charles County Circuit Court. Judge Ellsworth Cundiff said that the maximum sentence was inadequate, and told Stewart "injecting a child with the HIV virus really puts you in the same category as the worst war criminal" and "when God finally calls you, you are going to burn in hell from here to eternity."

Stewart became eligible for parole in 2011, but was twice denied.
