= Matthew Stewart =

Matthew or Matt Stewart may refer to:

- Matthew Stewart, 4th Earl of Lennox (1516–1571), father of Henry Stewart, King of the Scots
- Matthew Stewart, 2nd Earl of Lennox (1460–1513), Scottish nobleman
- Matthew Stewart (mathematician) (1717–1785), Scottish mathematician
- Matthew Stewart (philosopher) (born 1963), American philosopher and author from Santa Barbara, California
- Matthew Stuart (philosopher) (born 1967), American philosopher and Locke Historian
- Mattie Stewart (born 1973), Scottish rugby union player
- Matt Stewart (American football) (born 1979), American football linebacker and long snapper
- Matt Stuart (photographer) (born 1974), British photographer
- Matthew Stewart (British Army officer) (1784–1851), Scottish colonel in the Black Watch
- Matthew Stewart (moderator) (1881–1952), Scottish minister, moderator of the General Assembly of the Church of Scotland
