= Stewart McKinney =

Stewart or Stuart McKinney may refer to:

- Stewart McKinney (politician) (1931–1987), American politician
- Stewart McKinney (rugby union) (born 1946), former Ireland international rugby union player
- Stewart McKinney (crew chief), former American NASCAR Cup Series crew chief in 1963 Western North Carolina 500
- Stuart McKinney (Ugly Betty), a character on the TV series Ugly Betty
