= Helen Stewart =

Helen Stewart may refer to:

== People ==
- Helen Stewart Hunt (born 1938), Canadian Olympic swimmer (formerly known as Helen Stewart)
- Helen Stewart, wife of Jackie Stewart
- Helen Stewart (artist) (1900–1983), New Zealand painter
- Helen D'Arcy Stewart (1765–1838), Scottish poet and Edinburgh society hostess
- Helen Wiser Stewart (1854–1926), first Postmaster of Las Vegas, Nevada

== Fictional characters ==
- Helen Stewart, a character on the British TV series Bad Girls

== See also ==
- Helen Stuart (1919–2016), American singer
