= Tony Steward =

Tony Steward may refer to:

- Tony Steward (cricketer) (1941–2002), South African cricketer
- Tony Steward (American football) (born 1992), American football linebacker

== See also ==
- Tony Stewart (born 1971), American semi-retired professional stock car racing driver
