= Derek Stewart (footballer) =

Scottish footballer

Personal information
- Full name: Derek Stewart
- Date of birth: 18 June 1948 (age 78)
- Place of birth: Scotland
- Position: Wing half

Youth career
- Glasgow University

Senior career*
| Years | Team | Apps | (Gls) |
| 1968–1970 | Queen's Park | 41 | (0) |

International career
| 1969–1970 | Scotland Amateurs | 8 | (0) |
- * Club domestic league appearances and goals

Derek Stewart (born 18 June 1948) is a retired amateur Scottish footballer who played as a wing half in the Scottish League for Queen's Park. He was capped by Scotland at amateur level.
