= Brian Stewart (archaeologist) =

American anthropological archaeologist

Brian A. Stewart
- Born: 31 July 1978; Rockford, Illinois
- Education: University of Vermont; Oxford University
- Occupation: Archaeologist
- Known for: Archaeology of Lesotho; Theory of Generalist Specialist

Brian A. Stewart is an anthropological archaeologist, assistant professor of anthropology, and curator of Paleolithic archaeology at the University of Michigan Museum of Anthropological Archaeology. He is also an honorary research fellow at the Rock Art Institute of the University of the Witwatersrand. His research focuses primarily on prehistoric hunter-gatherer societies of Africa, especially southern Africa. He is particularly interested in determining when, how, and where humans developed adaptive plasticity. Brian Stewart has directed excavations of many sites, mostly in Lesotho and South Africa, among the most notable are Spitzkloof, Sehonghong, and Melikane.

== Education ==
Brian Stewart received a Bachelors of Arts in anthropology in 2000 from the University of Vermont. He went on to receive his M.St. with high distinction in 2001 and his Ph.D. in 2008 from the University of Oxford. He completed his dissertation under the mentorship of Dr. Peter Mitchell, focused on a spatial analysis of the Late Stone Age campsite of Dunefield Midden in South Africa.

After receiving his doctorate, Stewart was a junior research fellow (2008-2012) and postdoctoral research fellow (2010-2012) at the University of Cambridge. He went on to hold the title of lecturer at Harvard University (2012-2013) before joining the faculty of the Department of Anthropology at the University of Michigan at the rank of assistant professor and becoming curator of paleolithic archaeology at the University of Michigan Museum of Anthropological Archaeology.

== Research ==
Brian Stewart's research investigates the behavior plasticity of Stone Age people, focused primarily in southern Africa. Coastal-based research in southern Africa over the last few decades have brought much attention to this record, as archaeologists have documented diverse materials signatures of symbolic behaviors (beads, ochres, incised ostrich egg shells, etc.) dating to ~80,000 years ago. Before this, symbolic behavior, though considered a hallmark of modern humans, was thought to have emerged as humans entered the challenging environments of Europe as they spread to that continent ~40,000 years ago.

Stewart's work with colleagues is important in so much that it spreads the focus of Middle Stone Age research in southern Africa from nearly exclusively coastal cave sites to include the habitation of the highlands of Lesotho. Not only does this help overcome the geographical bias of the region's research to date, it provides a more holistic view of the lifeways of Middle Stone Age peoples, as these environments were far less favorable for human settlement, requiring unique social and technological adaptations. Thus, Stewart's research is imperative in that it investigates the behavioral plasticity of people during the first period of unequivocal evidence of symbolic expression and behavioral modernity.

== Awards ==
Brian Stewart gained much notoriety in 2008 after winning the inaugural Dance your Ph.D. competition with his interpretive dance depicting a hunter sharing the spoils of a kill with a chilled woman sitting at a campfire. In 2017, Stewart received a senior research grant from the Division Of Behavioral and Cognitive Science of the National Science Foundation to conduct collaborative research on the human adaptation to high altitude. In that same year, Stewart, along with colleagues, received a Research and Exploration Grant from the National Geographic Society to conduct a disciplinary study the long-term human occupation of Nama Karoo desert in South Africa.

== Publications ==
=== Books ===
- Jones, Sasha C.; Stewart, Brian A., eds. (2016). Africa from MIS 6-2: Population Dynamics and Paleoenvironments. Vertebrate Paleobiology and Paleoanthropology. Dordrecht: Springer. ISBN 9789401775199.

=== Articles ===
- Roberts, Patrick; Stewart, Brian A. (2018). "Defining the 'generalist specialist' niche for Pleistocene Homo sapiens". Nature Human Behaviour. 2 (8): 542–550. doi:10.1038/s41562-018-0394-4. PMID 31209320. S2CID 51881319.
- Pargeter, Justin; MacKay, Alex; Mitchell, Peter; Shea, John; Stewart, Brian A. (2016). "Primordialism and the 'Pleistocene San' of southern Africa". Antiquity. 90 (352): 1072–1079. doi:10.15184/aqy.2016.100. S2CID 163277811.
- Loftus, Emma; Stewart, Brian A.; Dewar, Genevieve; Lee-Thorp, Julia (2015). "Stable isotope evidence of late MIS 3 to middle Holocene palaeoenvironments from Sehonghong Rockshelter, eastern Lesotho". Journal of Quaternary Science. 30 (8): 805–816. Bibcode:2015JQS....30..805L. doi:10.1002/jqs.2817. S2CID 32382198.
- Stewart, Brian A.; Dewar, Genevieve I.; Morley, Mike W.; Inglis, Robyn H.; Wheeler, Mark; Jacobs, Zenobia; Roberts, Richard G. (2012). "Afromontane foragers of the Late Pleistocene: Site formation, chronology and occupational pulsing at Melikane Rockshelter, Lesotho". Quaternary International. 270: 40–60. Bibcode:2012QuInt.270...40S. doi:10.1016/j.quaint.2011.11.028.
- Dewar, Genevieve; Stewart, Brian A. (2012). "Preliminary results of excavations at Spitzkloof Rockshelter, Richtersveld, South Africa". Quaternary International. 270: 30–39. Bibcode:2012QuInt.270...30D. doi:10.1016/j.quaint.2011.04.046.
