= Bryan Stewart =

English footballer

Personal information
- Date of birth: 13 September 1985 (age 41)
- Place of birth: Stockton-on-Tees, England
- Position: Midfielder

Senior career*
Years	Team	Apps	(Gls)
2003–2006	York City	49	(3)
- * Club domestic league appearances and goals

Bryan William Stewart (born September 1985) is an English footballer.

Youth graduate Bryan Stewart made his York City debut in August 2003 voted youth team player of the year 03/04. In June 2006, he left the club when declining to sign a new contract in favour of a career outside of football

Stewart re-joined York on trial in August 2008 and played for the reserves in an 8–0 defeat to Scunthorpe United.
