= Lou Stewart =

Labor leader

Louis O. "Lou" Stewart (January 1, 1915 – March 26, 2002) was a prominent labor leader in Washington.

Stewart grew up in logging camps and attended 23 different grade schools. Following service in the Army Air Corps during World War II, he received his diploma from Weatherwax High School in Aberdeen, Washington. A journeyman carpenter before and after the war, Stewart entered the University of Washington on the GI Bill in 1950, earning a degree in Industrial Sociology. While attending graduate school, he went to work for the Seattle city government, helping to develop the first civil service system in Washington State. In 1960, he helped the territorial government of Guam develop its civil service system.

Stewart joined the staff of the Washington State Labor Council in 1967 and worked there until his retirement in 1982. During that time, Stewart was the Labor Council's chief state lobbyist in Olympia. A lifelong Democrat, he was a delegate to the 1972 national convention. Throughout his career and following retirement, he served on a number of boards and commissions, including the National Public Broadcasting Commission, KCPQ Channel 13, Group Health Cooperative, and the state's Centennial and Marine Employees Commissions.

Upon Stewart's death in 2002, then-State Labor Council President Rick Bender said, "There was no major issue facing the State Legislature in the '70s and '80s that didn't have Lou Stewart's involvement, and he was known on both sides of the aisle for absolute honesty and integrity."

== Irene Stewart ==
Stewart's daughter, Irene, was born November 29, 1957, in Seattle, and raised in Olympia. She graduated from William Winlock Miller High School in 1975 and the University of Washington in 1979. In November 2003, she was elected to the Seattle School District Board of Directors, District VI, which includes the West Seattle and South Park neighborhoods of Seattle. Stewart left the Board in 2007.
