= Duncan Stewart =

Duncan Stewart may refer to:

- Duncan Stewart (Mississippi politician) (1761–1820), lieutenant governor of Mississippi, 1817–1820
- Duncan Stewart (Uruguayan politician) (1833–1923), interim president of Uruguay in 1894
- Duncan Stewart (colonial administrator) (1904–1949), British governor of Sarawak assassinated by Rosli Dhobie in 1949
- Duncan Stewart of Ardsheal (1732–1793)
- Duncan Alexander Stewart (1850–1936), Scottish-born farmer and political figure in Manitoba, Canada
- Duncan Stewart, cardiologist and CEO of the Ottawa Health Research Institute
- Duncan Stewart (Home and Away), character in the Australian television series Home and Away
- Duncan Stewart (footballer, born 1860) (fl. 1884–1892), Scottish footballer (Dumbarton FC and Scotland)
- Duncan Stewart (footballer, born 1900) (1900–?), Scottish footballer for Sunderland
- Duncan Stewart (golfer) (born 1984), Scottish golfer
- Duncan Stewart (environmentalist) (born 1948), Irish television presenter
- Duncan Stewart (academic) (1930–1996), British academic administrator
