= Nate Thompson =

American ice hockey player (born 1984)

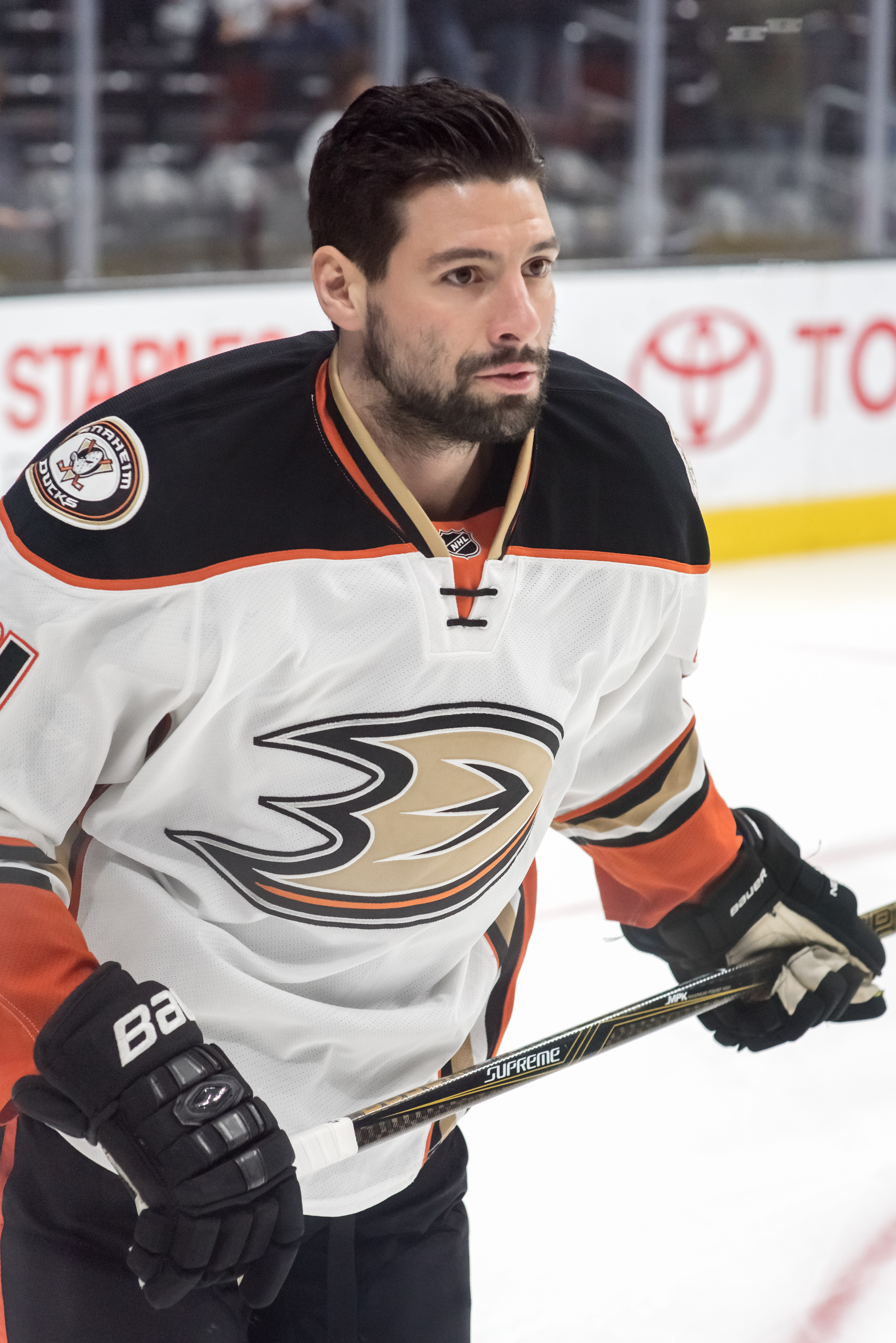
- Thompson with the Anaheim Ducks in April 2016
- Born: October 5, 1984 (age 41) Anchorage, Alaska, U.S.
- Height: 6 ft 0 in (183 cm)
- Weight: 206 lb (93 kg; 14 st 10 lb)
- Position: Center
- Shot: Left
- Played for: Boston Bruins; New York Islanders; Tampa Bay Lightning; Anaheim Ducks; Ottawa Senators; Los Angeles Kings; Montreal Canadiens; Philadelphia Flyers; Winnipeg Jets
- National team: United States
- NHL draft: 183rd overall, 2003; Boston Bruins
- Playing career: 2005–2023

Nathan Scott Thompson (born October 5, 1984) is an American former professional ice hockey forward. He played for the Boston Bruins, New York Islanders, Tampa Bay Lightning, Anaheim Ducks, Ottawa Senators, Los Angeles Kings, Montreal Canadiens, Philadelphia Flyers and Winnipeg Jets. The Bruins drafted him in the sixth round (183rd overall) at the 2003 NHL entry draft.

== Playing career ==
=== Amateur ===
Thompson played major junior ice hockey for the Western Hockey League (WHL)'s Seattle Thunderbirds beginning in the 2001–02 season. After his second season with Seattle, in 2002–03, he was drafted by the Boston Bruins in the sixth round, 183rd overall, at the 2003 NHL entry draft on June 21–22, 2003.

Thompson remained with the Thunderbirds for two additional seasons after his NHL selection by the Bruins, in 2003–04 and 2004–05. However, during the latter season, he joined Boston's American Hockey League (AHL) affiliate, the Providence Bruins on their run in the 2005 Calder Cup playoffs, making his professional debut.

=== Professional ===
==== Boston Bruins ====
Thompson signed an entry-level contract with the Bruins on July 20, 2005, and made his debut in the NHL with the team in 2006–07, playing four games; however, he spent the majority of the season with Providence in the AHL.

==== New York Islanders ====
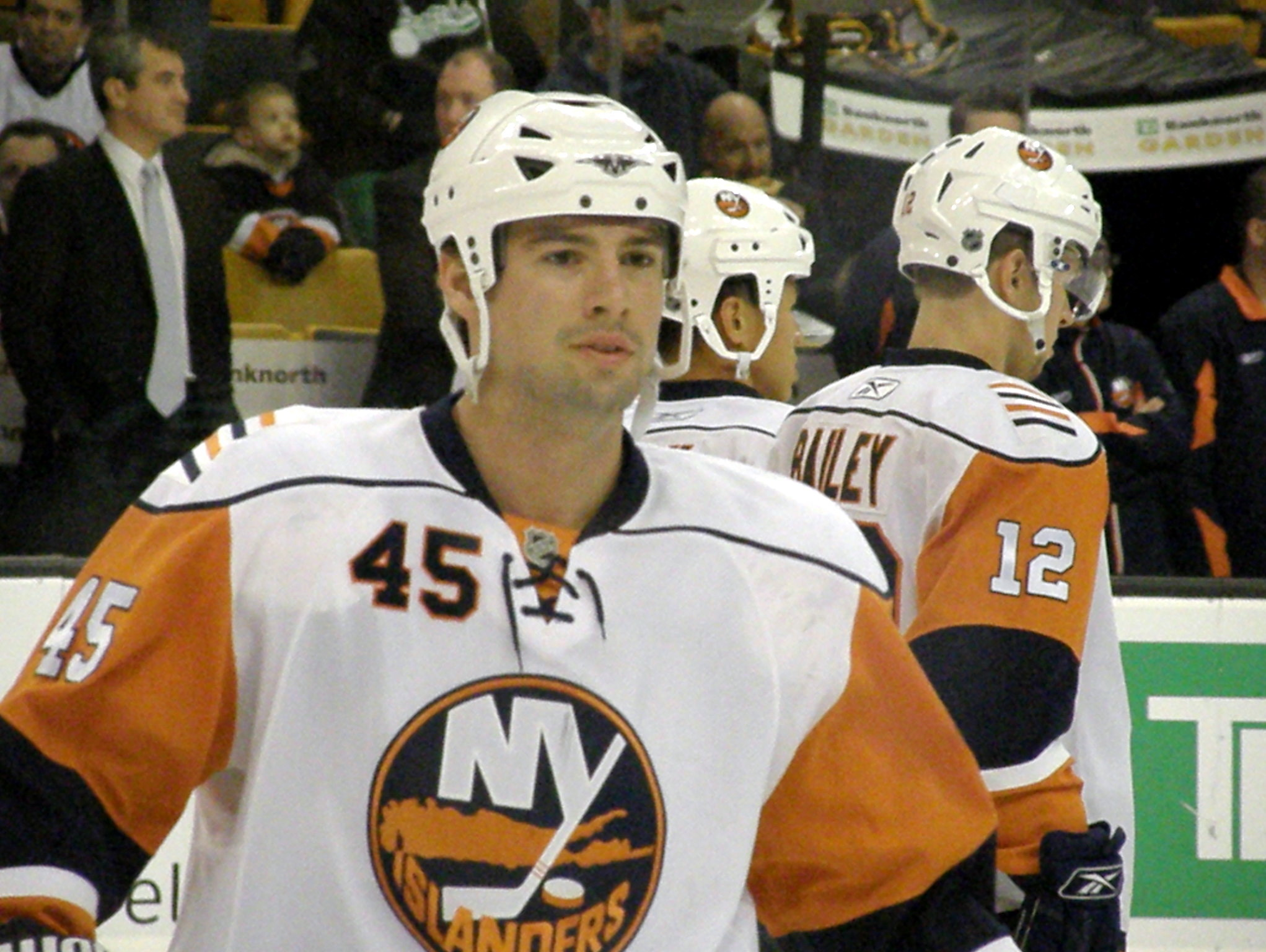
Thompson with the New York Islanders in November 2008.

On October 8, 2008, just before the start of the 2008-09 NHL season, The Islanders claimed Thompson off of waivers and added him to their NHL roster; defenseman Brett Skinner was reassigned to the AHL Bridgeport Sound Tigers to make room for Thompson. He scored his first NHL goal in his 16th career game, a short-handed shot past Henrik Lundqvist that opened up scoring for a 2-1 victory over the New York Rangers on November 4. Thompson's season was hindered by injury. First, a groin injury suffered in a game against the Atlanta Thrashers at the start of November sidelined Thompson for a number of weeks. Two months later, Thompson missed 12 games with a fractured ankle, returning on January 14. Less than a month later, Thompson suffered a shoulder injury with an anticipated recovery time of four to six weeks.

On July 27, 2009, Thompson was re-signed to a one-year contract with the Islanders.

==== Tampa Bay Lightning ====
After registering six points in 39 games with the Islanders in the 2009–10 season, Thompson was claimed off waivers by the Tampa Bay Lightning on January 21, 2010. He would appear in 32 games for the Lightning, scoring one goal and three assists for four points; in total, he scored two goals and eight assists for both the Islanders and Lightning, then-career-highs. He also excelled in face-offs, winning 219 of 385 taken for Tampa Bay, a 56.9 percent success rate. In the subsequent off-season, on July 10, 2010, Tampa Bay re-signed Thompson to a one-year contract.

On January 31, 2011, Tampa Bay signed Thompson to a two-year contract extension. At that point, he had played in 51 games with the team, recording career-highs for goals (7), assists (10) and points (17). Thompson also continued his success in the face-off circle, winning 249 of 446 draws taken (55.8 percent). He ranked seventh among NHL forwards with 49 blocked shots, and was also fourth on the team in takeaways, with 25.

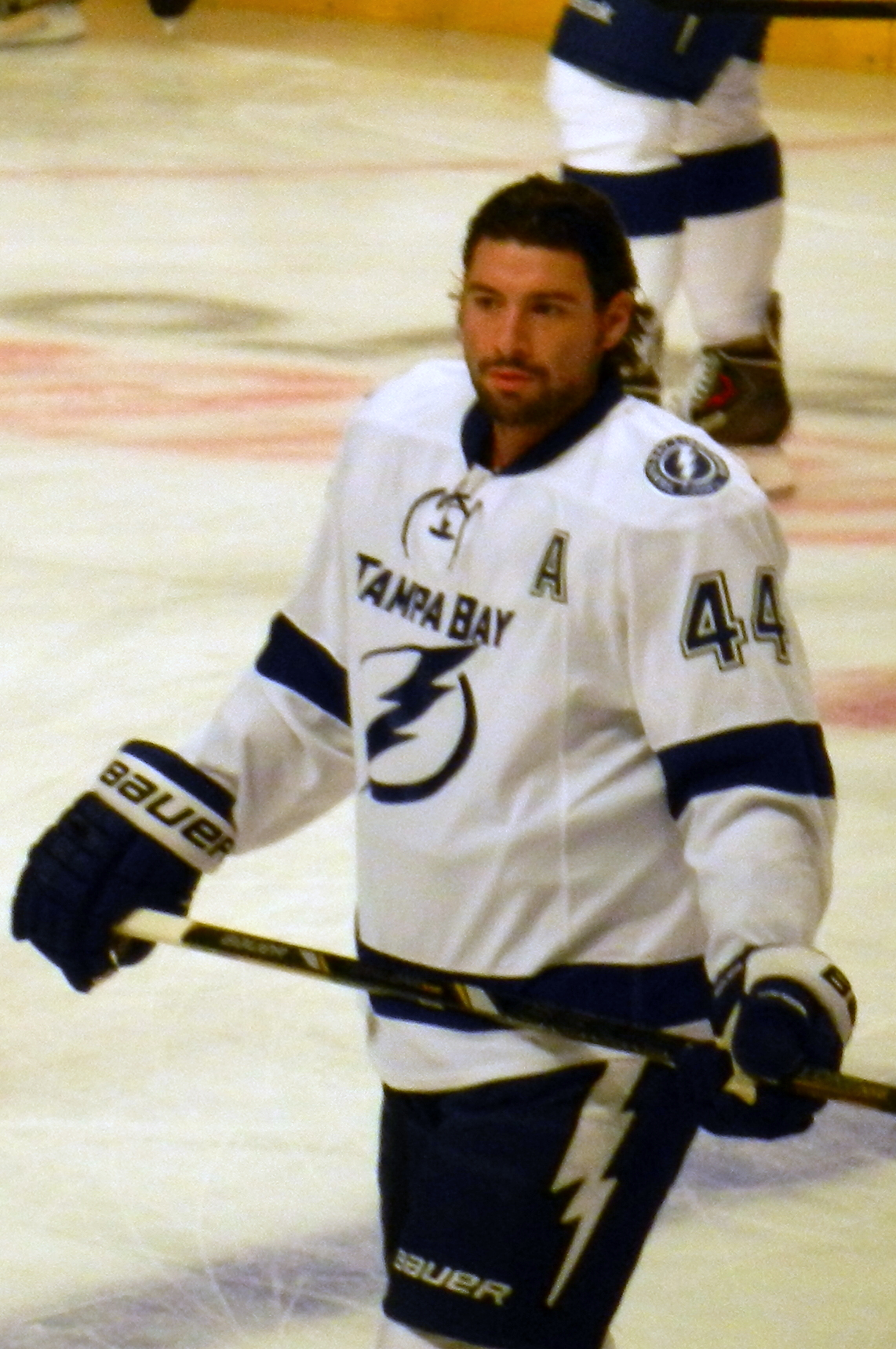
Thompson with the Tampa Bay Lightning in October 2013

During the 2012–13 NHL lockout, Thompson played for his hometown Alaska Aces of the ECHL, later returning to the Lightning at the end of the lockout. On March 3, 2013, Tampa Bay signed Thompson to a four-year contract extension. He finished the shortened, 48-game 2012–13 season with seven goals and eight assists from 45 games played.

==== Anaheim Ducks ====
He played in 81 games during the 2013–14 season, scoring nine goals and seven assists for 16 points. On June 29, 2014, Thompson was traded by Tampa Bay to the Anaheim Ducks in exchange for two picks in the 2015 NHL entry draft. In his first season with the Ducks, Thompson appeared in 80 games, scoring five goals along with 13 assists.

On December 14, the NHL department of player safety issued a three-game suspension against Thompson for his hit on Justin Faulk of the Carolina Hurricanes. He was suspended for what was deemed an illegal check to the head. Thompson was given a game misconduct at the time of the incident. As a result of the suspension, Thompson lost $25,806.45 in salary.

==== Ottawa Senators ====
On the first day of the 2017 free agency period, Thompson signed a two-year, $3.3 million contract with the Ottawa Senators, a deal that reunited him with his former Lightning coach Guy Boucher. Replacing Chris Kelly as the fourth-line center for Ottawa, it was the first time in eight NHL seasons that Thompson had played for a Canadian team. A lower body injury suffered during a January 5, 2018 match against the San Jose Sharks continued to hinder Thompson for the remainder of his Senators tenure – he was in and out of the lineup through January and February, missing 11 out of his last 15 games. In his time with the Senators, Thompson recorded four goals and 11 points.

==== Los Angeles Kings ====
The Los Angeles Kings acquired Thompson and Dion Phaneuf from the Senators on February 13, 2018, in exchange for Marián Gáborík and Nick Shore. Thompson enjoyed the trade, which put him in the more physically aggressive Western Conference and allowed him to exercise his abilities as both a two-way player and as a penalty killer. He was also familiar with many of his new teammates, such as Richard Park, who Thompson played with on the Islanders, and Jake Muzzin, with whom Thompson practiced during the offseason. He played in 26 games for the Kings to close out the regular season, recording six points. The Kings qualified for the 2018 Stanley Cup playoffs, but were swept in the first-round series by the Vegas Golden Knights.

Thompson returned to the Kings for the 2018-19 NHL season, centering Kyle Clifford and Trevor Lewis on the fourth line. He also spent extensive time skating alongside rookie Austin Wagner, serving as a mentor for the younger player. The Kings as a whole struggled to score at the start of the season, and Thompson did not notch his first goal of the year until November 18 as part of a 5-3 loss to the Nashville Predators. Shortly after that goal, assistant coach Marco Sturm decided to move Thompson from the penalty kill unit to the second power-play unit for the Kings; it was the first time in his NHL career that he had been on the offensive side of a power-play squad. Thompson skated in 53 games with the Kings during the 2018-19 season, recording four points, averaging nearly 13 minutes per game, and winning 53 percent of his faceoffs.

==== Montreal Canadiens ====
On February 11, 2019, as part of a larger series of moves for both teams, Thompson was traded to the Montreal Canadiens, who also received a fifth-round selection in the 2019 NHL entry draft in exchange for a fourth-round selection. Thompson and AHL call-up Dale Weise were part of a larger effort from general manager Marc Bergevin to rebuild Montreal's fourth line, which had not seen a goal since December 29. Flanked by Weise and Nicolas Deslauriers, Thompson quickly became the Canadiens' everyday fourth-line center, playing in 25 of the 26 regular-season games following his trade while putting up one goal and six assists.

Thompson signed a one-year, $1 million contract extension with Montreal on April 25, 2019. He was thrilled by the extension, telling reporters, "I had no intention of going to free agency. This is the team I wanted to play on." Responding to criticisms from sports journalists that he was slow on the ice, Thompson spent the offseason improving his diet and exercising in order to build lean muscle mass. Continuing to serve on the fourth line, Thompson also became an unofficial captain for the Canadiens during the 2019–20 season, mentoring rookie centers Nick Suzuki, Ryan Poehling, and Jesperi Kotkaniemi. "Uncle Nate", as many of the younger players referred to him, recorded four goals and 10 assists in 63 games with Montreal, going −2 and winning 55.1 percent of his face-offs.

==== Philadelphia Flyers ====
At the NHL trading deadline on February 24, 2020, Montreal sent Thompson to the Philadelphia Flyers in exchange for a fifth-round selection in the 2021 NHL entry draft. Coach Alain Vigneault was in need of more veteran skaters, and inserted Thompson into Connor Bunnaman's spot on the fourth line. On March 11, Thompson was diagnosed with a left knee sprain resulting from a collision with Ondrej Kase of the Bruins, and he was expected to miss at least two weeks. The following day, however, the COVID-19 pandemic forced the NHL to indefinitely suspend the remainder of the 2019–20 season. At the time, Thompson had only appeared in seven games for Philadelphia, recording one assist in the process. When the NHL resumed for the 2020 Stanley Cup playoffs in Toronto, Thompson was one of 31 Flyers selected to play in the "bubble". Vigneault was criticized for Thompson's expanded role in the playoffs: Thompson was one of the only players to appear in all 16 playoff games that season, and he was often tasked with "eating minutes", preventing the Islanders' top forwards from scoring rather than generating points of his own. He scored only one goal in all 16 playoff games, and the Flyers fell to the Islanders in the second round.

==== Winnipeg Jets ====
On October 10, 2020, Thompson agreed to a one-year, $750,000 contract with the Winnipeg Jets. There, he was placed on the fourth line, centering Trevor Lewis and Mathieu Perreault. Sports broadcaster Kelly Moore referred to the line combination as the "Dirty 30s", as Perreault, the youngest skater on the line, was 33 years old. This proved to be one of the most productive lines on the team: by April 4, no goals had been the Dirty 30s during equal-strength play, and their collective plus–minus was a +18. On April 17, Thompson played in his 800th career NHL game, a 3–0 loss to the Edmonton Oilers. He was the third Alaskan skater to reach that milestone, following Scott Gomez and Brandon Dubinsky. Despite these on-ice successes, the 2020-21 NHL season proved emotionally difficult for Thompson: with the Canada–United States border closed due to the COVID-19 pandemic, he was cut off from his family in the United States, especially his son, who lived in Minnesota.

Thompson did not take the ice for the game in which the Jets clinched a spot in the 2021 Stanley Cup playoffs, and the fourth line was used only sparingly in the North Division first-round playoff series against the Oilers. He was able to make a difference for the team in Game 1 of that series, however, by registering assists on both the game-tying and game-winning goals in Game 1. The Jets swept Edmonton and advanced to the second round, where they were swept in turn by Montreal. In 44 games with the Jets, Thompson scored two goals and three assists. He became a free agent at the end of the season.

==== Second stint with Philadelphia ====
During the 2021 NHL free agency period, Thompson signed a one-year, $800,000 deal to rejoin the Flyers on July 28.

==== Later years and retirement ====
As a free agent from the Flyers, Thompson went un-signed over the off-season. He agreed to return to the Los Angeles Kings organization in accepting a professional tryout to participate in training camp and the pre-season. After he was released from his tryout with the Kings, Thompson was signed to a professional tryout contract with AHL affiliate, the Ontario Reign, on October 11, 2022.

Thompson announced his retirement from hockey on July 19, 2023.

== International play ==
Medal record

Representing the United States

Ice hockey

Ice Hockey World Championships
Bronze medal – third place	2013 Sweden/Finland	

In addition to his NHL career, Thompson has also represented the United States at the Ice Hockey World Championships. He first represented Team USA in 2012, serving as an alternate captain alongside Jets skater Jim Slater and under captain Jack Johnson of the Columbus Blue Jackets. Although the US failed to place, finishing seventh in the pool of 16, Thompson had two critical moments during the opening stages. First, he scored a regulation goal in Team USA's 5–4 overtime victory against Canada, the first time that the US defeated Canada at the World Championships since 2001. Later, Thompson scored the go-ahead goal in a 5–3 defeat of Belarus.

Thompson reprised his role as the alternate captain of Team USA at the 2013 IIHF World Championships, serving alongside Lightning teammate Matt Carle, while Paul Stastny of the Colorado Avalanche captained the team. Thompson scored his first goal in the tournament as part of an 8–3 rout of Russia in the Cluster B Quarterfinals; it was the first time that a Russian or Soviet Union team had allowed eight or more goals at an international ice hockey competition. Thompson and the US team ultimately took bronze in the tournament, defeating Finland 3–2 in a penalty shootout.

== Personal life ==
Thompson married his first wife, former Boston College Eagles women's ice hockey player Cristin Stuart, in July 2013. They have one child together, Teague Thompson, born on May 18, 2015. By marriage to Cristin, Thompson was the son-in-law to Mayo Clinic physician Michael Stuart, and the brother-in-law to NHL players Mike, Colin, and Mark Stuart.

Raised in a Christian family, Thompson converted to Judaism in July 2018, the same faith of his second wife, Sydney Kaplan. The couple wed one week after Thompson's conversion was finalized. Thompson and Kaplan separated December 2020 and their divorce was finalized July 2021.

For most of his professional hockey career, Thompson struggled with substance abuse. He began drinking alcohol around the age of 11, and by his mid-20s, he was taking a number of recreational drugs, including cocaine, MDMA, and psilocybin mushrooms. He made the decision to stop drinking and using drugs on October 10, 2016, and has been sober since. When he joined the Jets, Thompson elected to wear jersey No. 11 as a tribute to Rick Rypien, who died by suicide in 2011 after signing with the Jets. He made the decision as a tribute to Rypien and both players' struggles with their mental health.

As of 2021, Thompson dated former actor/model and current sculptor, Sonni Pacheco. Pacheco is Jeremy Renner's ex-wife and they share a daughter, Ava Berlin Renner. Thompson and Pacheco welcomed daughter Wylder Rayne on March 21, 2023.

== Career statistics ==
=== Regular season and playoffs ===
			Regular season					Playoffs
Season	Team	League	GP	G	A	Pts	PIM	GP	G	A	Pts	PIM
2000–01	Alaska All Stars AAA	U18 AAA	—	—	—	—	—	—	—	—	—	—
2001–02	Seattle Thunderbirds	WHL	69	13	26	39	42	11	1	3	4	13
2002–03	Seattle Thunderbirds	WHL	61	10	24	34	48	15	5	4	9	6
2003–04	Seattle Thunderbirds	WHL	65	13	23	36	24	—	—	—	—	—
2004–05	Seattle Thunderbirds	WHL	58	19	15	34	39	12	1	2	3	2
2004–05	Providence Bruins	AHL	—	—	—	—	—	11	0	1	1	4
2005–06	Providence Bruins	AHL	74	8	10	18	58	3	0	0	0	10
2006–07	Providence Bruins	AHL	67	8	15	23	74	13	0	2	2	9
2006–07	Boston Bruins	NHL	4	0	0	0	0	—	—	—	—	—
2007–08	Providence Bruins	AHL	75	19	20	39	83	10	2	3	5	4
2008–09	New York Islanders	NHL	43	2	2	4	49	—	—	—	—	—
2009–10	New York Islanders	NHL	39	1	5	6	39	—	—	—	—	—
2009–10	Tampa Bay Lightning	NHL	32	1	3	4	17	—	—	—	—	—
2010–11	Tampa Bay Lightning	NHL	79	10	15	25	29	18	1	3	4	4
2011–12	Tampa Bay Lightning	NHL	68	9	6	15	21	—	—	—	—	—
2012–13	Alaska Aces	ECHL	24	7	14	21	23	—	—	—	—	—
2012–13	Tampa Bay Lightning	NHL	45	7	8	15	17	—	—	—	—	—
2013–14	Tampa Bay Lightning	NHL	81	9	7	16	27	4	0	0	0	0
2014–15	Anaheim Ducks	NHL	80	5	13	18	39	12	2	4	6	6
2015–16	San Diego Gulls	AHL	2	0	0	0	0	—	—	—	—	—
2015–16	Anaheim Ducks	NHL	49	3	3	6	47	7	2	0	2	2
2016–17	San Diego Gulls	AHL	3	0	1	1	2	—	—	—	—	—
2016–17	Anaheim Ducks	NHL	30	1	1	2	14	17	2	4	6	6
2017–18	Ottawa Senators	NHL	43	4	7	11	10	—	—	—	—	—
2017–18	Los Angeles Kings	NHL	26	1	5	6	10	4	0	0	0	0
2018–19	Los Angeles Kings	NHL	53	4	2	6	17	—	—	—	—	—
2018–19	Montreal Canadiens	NHL	25	1	6	7	0	—	—	—	—	—
2019–20	Montreal Canadiens	NHL	63	4	10	14	21	—	—	—	—	—
2019–20	Philadelphia Flyers	NHL	7	0	1	1	9	16	1	0	1	14
2020–21	Winnipeg Jets	NHL	44	2	3	5	4	8	0	2	2	2
2021–22	Philadelphia Flyers	NHL	33	1	2	3	31	—	—	—	—	—
2022–23	Ontario Reign	AHL	30	1	5	6	44	2	2	1	3	0
NHL totals			844	65	99	164	401	86	8	13	21	34

=== International ===
Year	Team	Event	Result	GP	G	A	Pts	PIM
2012	United States	WC	7th	8	2	0	2	0
2013	United States	WC	3rd place, bronze medalist(s)	10	1	2	3	8
Senior totals				18	3	2	5	8

== See also ==
- List of select Jewish ice hockey players
- Empty Netters
