= Michael Stuart (physician) =

American sports physician and orthopedic surgeon

- Education: DePauw University; Rush Medical College
- Occupations: Sports physician; orthopedic surgeon
- Known for: Mayo Clinic Sports Medicine Center director and vice-chairman of orthopedic surgery; USA Hockey chief medical officer
- Children: 4, including Mike, Colin, Mark

Michael J. Stuart is an American former sports physician and orthopedic surgeon. He was a professor and vice-chairman of orthopedic surgery at the Mayo Clinic, and a co-director of the Mayo Clinic Sports Medicine Center. He published more than 370 journal articles and 50 book chapters, as of 2022. He specialized in sports medicine, and advocated for strength, flexibility, and awareness, to reduce injuries in ice hockey. He collaborated on the 2010, 2013 and 2017 Ice Hockey Summits, which focused on concussions, and educational programs for players, coaches and parents. His concussion research included studying biomarkers, neuroimaging, and cognitive neuroscience. He argued that concussions are diagnosed more accurately with electroencephalography and the King-Devick Test eye test, and advocates their usage in sport.

Stuart was the chief medical and safety officer for USA Hockey, a medical consultant for the National Hockey League (NHL), and a member of the International Ice Hockey Federation (IIHF) medical committee. He was the team physician for the United States men's team at the Winter Olympics and World Championships; the United States men's junior team at the World Junior Championships; the USA Hockey National Team Development Program at the IIHF World U18 Championships, and for the Rochester Mustangs and Rochester Ice Hawks.

Stuart attended Rush Medical College, followed by graduate studies at the Mayo Clinic College of Medicine and Science, and the University of Western Ontario. Inspired by success of the United States men's national sled hockey team, he established the Rochester Mustangs sled hockey team, and serves as the team president. In 2008, Stuart received the "Doc" Counsilman Science Award for ice hockey from the United States Olympic Committee, and the USA Hockey Excellence in Safety Award. In 2014, he received the USA Hockey President's Award. He is a resident of Rochester, Minnesota, and is the father of three sons to play in the NHL; Mike, Colin, and Mark.

== Early life and education ==
Attending St. Bede Academy, Stuart played high school football, basketball, and baseball. He recalled sustaining a concussion while playing, but returned to the game without medical treatment or professional diagnosis. Inspried by observing a friend's father at work, Stuart wanted to become a physician.

Playing on a football scholarship at DePauw University, Stuart later became the student assistant coach for the DePauw Tigers football team, and was named Phi Beta Kappa and an honor scholar in 1977. He graduated from DePauw University with a Bachelor of Arts degree in 1979. He was named Alpha Omega Alpha at Rush Medical College in 1982, and graduated with a Doctor of Medicine degree in 1983. He completed a residency at the Mayo Clinic College of Medicine and Science in 1988, and spent one month in California instructed by Frank Jobe. Stuart completed a fellowship in sports medicine at the University of Western Ontario in 1990.

== Medical career ==
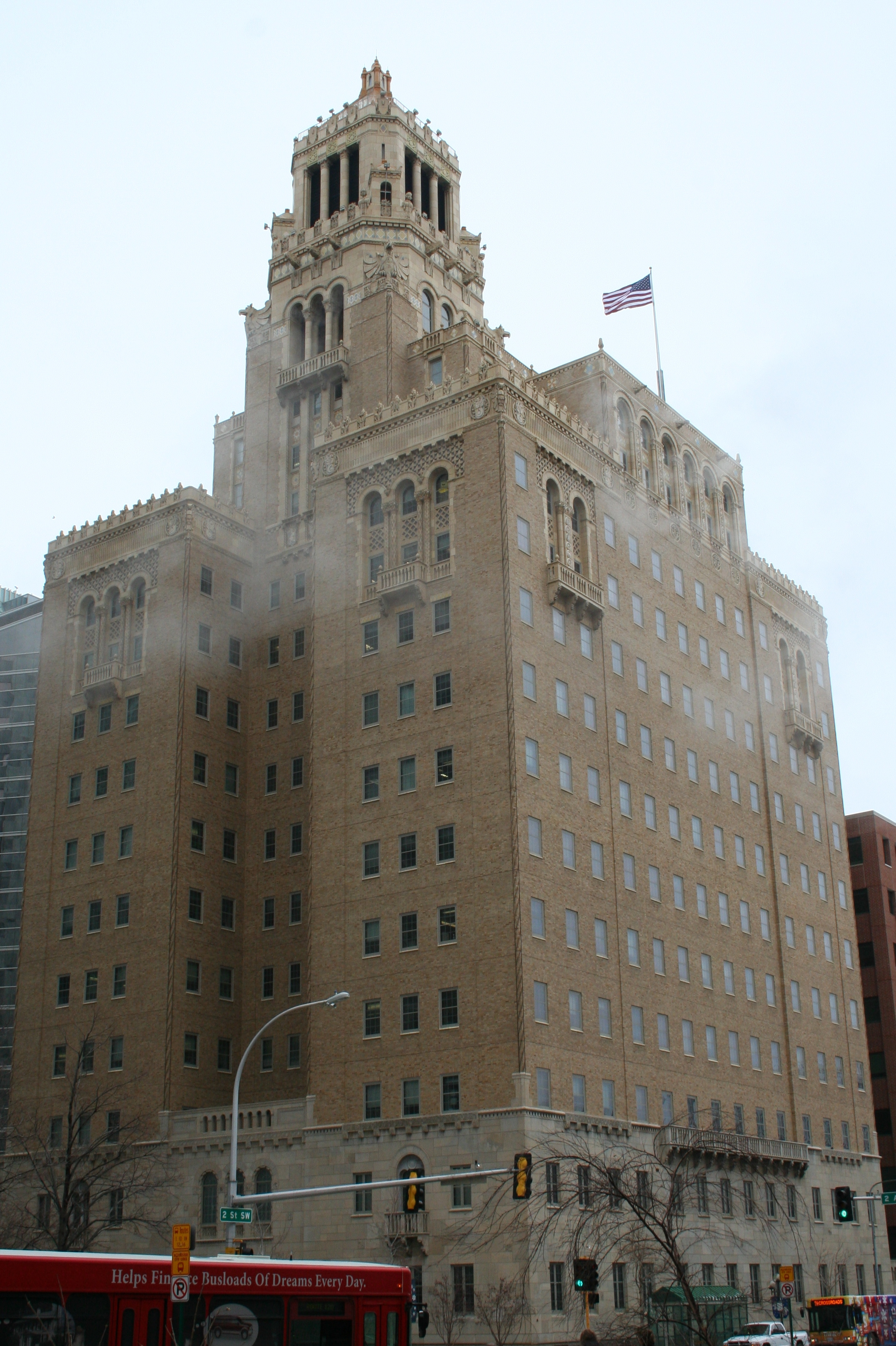
The Plummer Building at the Mayo Clinic in Rochester

Stuart was a professor and vice-chairman of orthopedic surgery at the Mayo Clinic in Rochester, Minnesota, and a co-director of the Mayo Clinic Sports Medicine Center. As an orthopedic surgeon, he was an authority on the anterior cruciate ligament injury and the meniscus. He specialized in sports medicine, and was certified by the American Board of Orthopaedic Surgery, the American Orthopaedic Society for Sports Medicine, and the Arthroscopy Association of North America. He was named to the advisory board of TeachAids in 2019. As of 2022, he is a member of the American Journal of Sports Medicine editorial board, and the Minnesota State High School League medical advisory committee. He is a past member of the American Orthopaedic Society for Sports Medicine board of directors. Stuart performed his final surgery in November 2023, retired in January 2024, and became an emeritus professor at Mayo Clinic.

=== Injury research ===
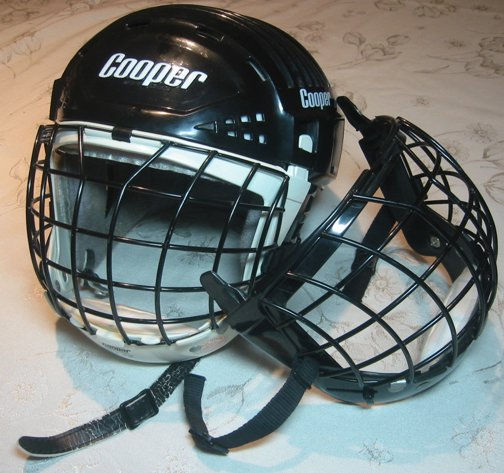
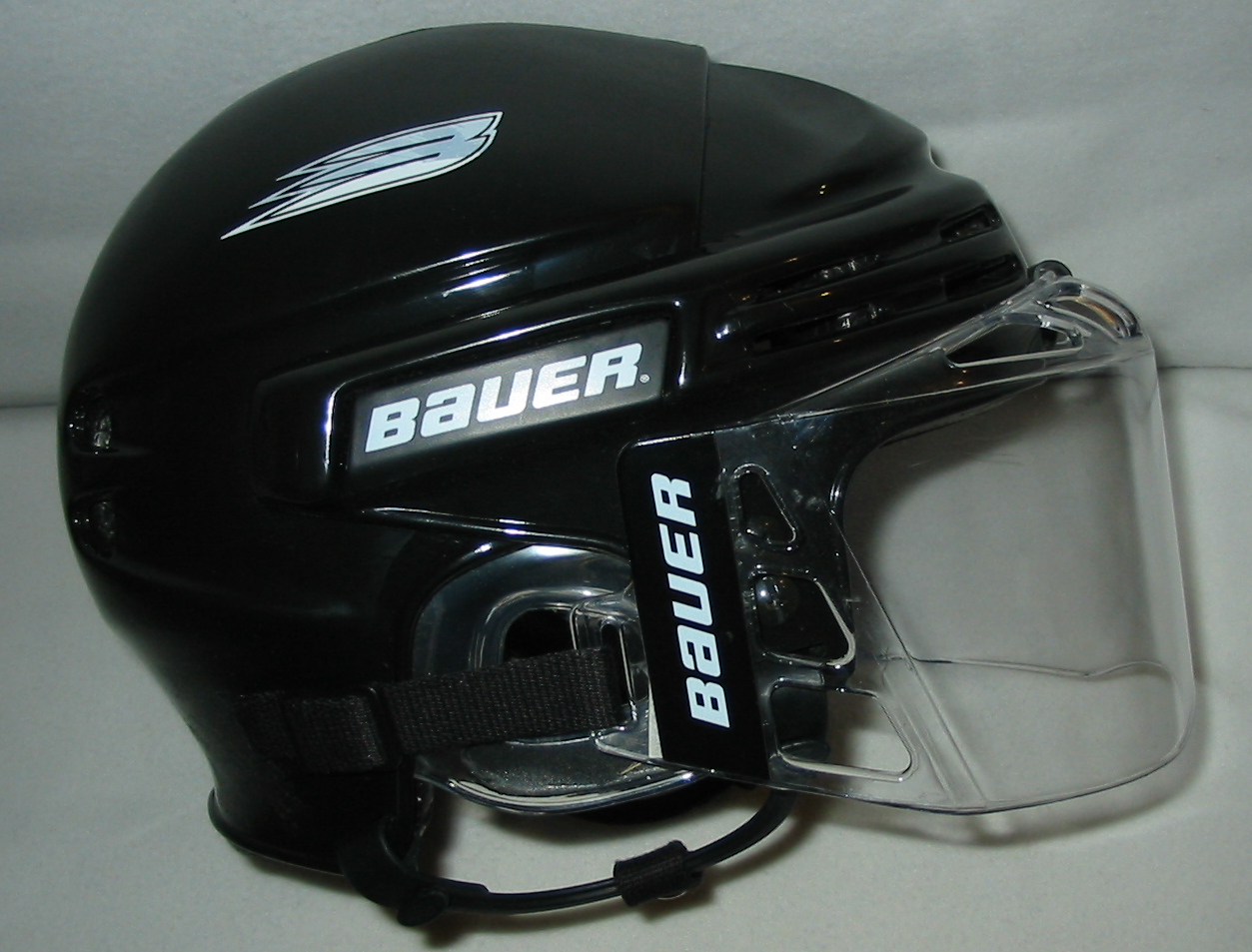
Hockey helmets with different types of face protection

Stuart has published more than 370 journal articles and 50 book chapters as of 2022, including the subjects of epidemiology and prevention of sports injuries. He co-authored a study published in the American Journal of Sports Medicine in 2002, which tracked 282 players and injuries in the United States Hockey League. The study reported that players not wearing a hockey helmet with facial protection were 4.7 times more likely to have an eye injury compared to players wearing a visor on their helmets.

Advocating for facial protection on hockey helmets, presented the study to the National Hockey League Players' Association (NHLPA) during the 2004–05 season, but no changes were made for National Hockey League (NHL) players. He presented the same study to the American Hockey League, which led to visors on helmets being mandated as of the 2006–07 season.

The Mayo Clinic Sports Medicine Center began collecting data on catastrophic hockey injuries as of 2008. According to Stuart, cervical fractures are the most prominent injury, and the spine and head are the most injured body parts. He advocates for neck strengthening and flexibility exercises to reduce injuries in hockey. In collaboration with USA Hockey in 2012, the Mayo Clinic published a video demonstrating the danger of players ducking their heads before contact with the boards of an ice rink. This resulted in a training program called "Heads Up, Don't Duck", to instruct players to keep their head up for physical contact.

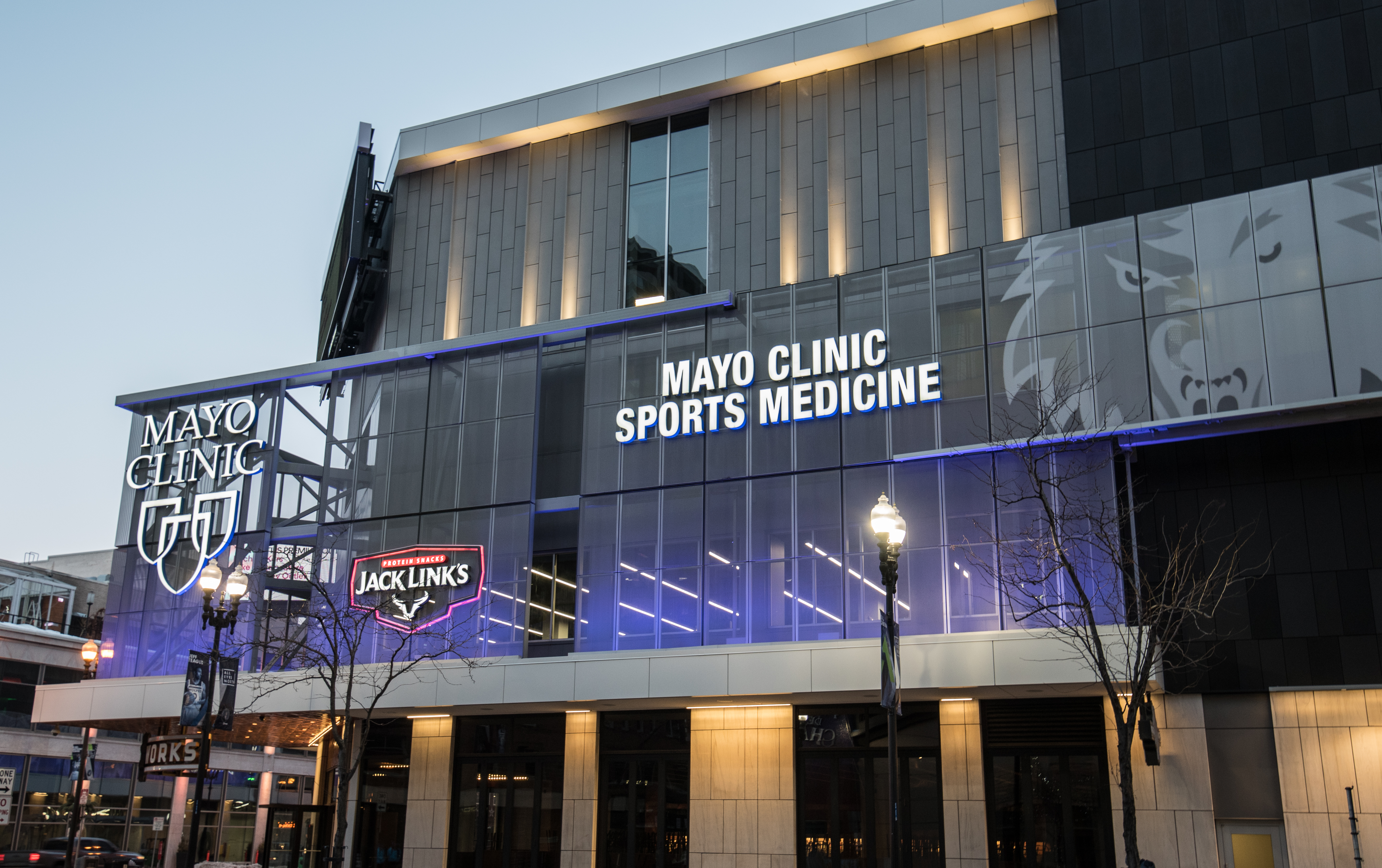
Mayo Clinic Sports Medicine Center in Minneapolis

The Mayo Clinic Sports Medicine Center expanded in 2014, via a partnership with the Minnesota Timberwolves and a new building attached to the Target Center in Minneapolis. The expansion included facilities for on-ice testing, cognitive training, and visual training, in addition to sport-specific conditioning. Stuart felt that improving on-ice awareness, would improve how a player sees the game, increase anticipation, and reduce unanticipated physical contact leading to injuries. He also advocates for stretching and proper mechanics during training and conditioning, as a means to prevent injuries.

=== Concussion research ===
Stuart is a member of the scientific advisory board to the International Concussion Society. He advocates for education on the long-term and short-term effects of concussions, removal of players from competition who have a suspected concussion, and improved diagnosis and treatment of concussions.

Video explanation of concussions in children

Stuart collaborated with Mayo Clinic colleague Aynsley Smith to arrange the 2010 Ice Hockey Summit; a two-day conference which invited medical professionals, researchers, equipment manufacturers, coaches, officials and hockey administrators. The summit focused on youth head injuries, how to prevent concussions, and educational programs for the players, coaches and parents. Stuart felt that, "younger players need to first develop their skills, and those who administer the game must strive to minimize injury risk— especially to the brain".

Discussions at the summit resulted in six steps to deal with concussions; which included "standardized databases and metrics, enhanced recognition, diagnosis, management and return-to-play guidelines, analysis of the influence of equipment and facilities, education and prevention, rule changes, policies and enforcement, and communications". Stuart co-authored a report on the summit which was published in academic journals, including the Clinical Journal of Sports Medicine, Current Sports Medicine Reports, Archives of Physical Medicine and Rehabilitation, The Clinical Neuropsychologist, Bulletin of the Sports Medicine Section, and PM&R.

Stuart helped organize the 2013 Ice Hockey Summit, to build upon results from the 2010 event, which included mandatory concussion education for coaches, improved body contact instruction for younger players, and rule changes to deter checking to the head, and checking from behind. The Mayo Clinic Sports Medicine Center collaborated with Minnesota Hockey to compile data from these rule changes, which resulted a steady decrease in checking-from-behind penalties. At the 2014 USA Hockey annual congress, Stuart sought to reduce concussions and raise awareness on head injuries. USA Hockey subsequently discussed eliminating fighting in ice hockey at the junior ice hockey level. According to Stuart, scientific evidence supported removing fighting in junior hockey, when players and their brains are still developing physically.

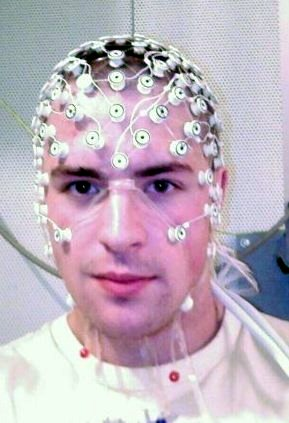
Example of electroencephalography with electrodes

In 2017, Stuart organized a third Ice Hockey Summit for action on concussions. At the summit, he lectured on the King-Devick Test for coaches and parents to assess concussions in children, research into biomarkers to diagnose concussions, and neuroimaging to evaluate multiple concussions. He felt that youth hockey needed to concentrate on changing on-ice behavior, mutual respect, and sportsmanship. Stuart and Mayo Clinic researchers argued in the Clinical Journal of Sports Medicine in 2017, that concussions are diagnosed more accurately with electroencephalography and the King-Devick eye test, rather than with neurocognitive tests used by team physicians in the NHL, other professional leagues, college and high school teams.

Stuart led a cognitive neuroscience study in collaboration with Ryan D'Arcy published in 2021, which tracked vital signs and brain function for multiple years in male youth ice hockey players. The research found that repetitive impacts to the head can result in functional brain impairments. Stuart announced a collaboration in 2023, on a study to evaluate blood and saliva biomarkers for concussions in high school hockey players, to understand effects of acute concussions and subclinical head trauma.

=== Ice hockey physician ===
Stuart was the team physician for the Rochester Mustangs of the United States Hockey League for 17 years, then joined the safety and protective equipment committee of USA Hockey, and later became the chief medical and safety officer for USA Hockey. He sat on the USA Hockey task force to review body checking, which implemented rule changes to delay checking until age 13. During the COVID-19 pandemic in the United States, Stuart issued directives and guidelines for safety in ice hockey.

Other positions held by Stuart include being a team physician for the Rochester Ice Hawks in the North American 3 Hockey League, a medical consultant for the NHL and the NHLPA, and as a member of the International Ice Hockey Federation (IIHF) medical committee where he is a medical supervisor at international competitions. Representing the IIHF, he toured medical facilities in host cities prior to Olympic Games, and conducted workshops for medical providers.

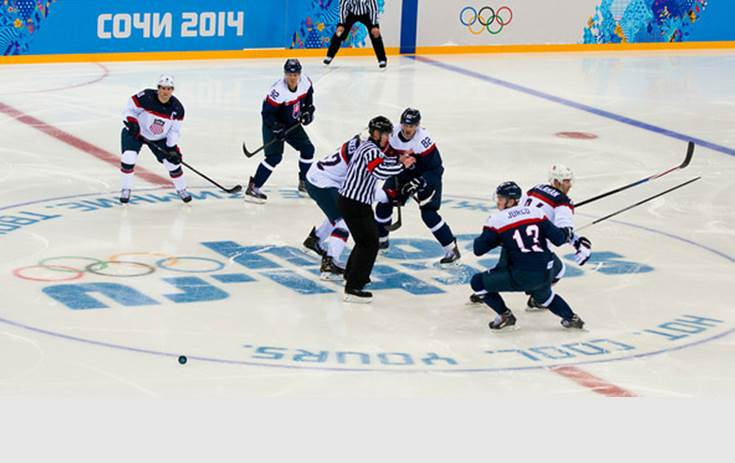
United States vs. Slovakia at the 2014 Winter Olympics

Stuart served as the team physician for the United States men's team at the Winter Olympics in 1994, 2010, 2014 and 2022; at the World Championships in 2000 and 2013; and at the 2016 World Cup of Hockey. He also worked as the team physician for the United States men's junior team at the World Junior Championships in 2003 and 2004; and for the USA Hockey National Team Development Program at the IIHF World U18 Championships in 2001, 2002, and 2019.

In a 2014 interview, Stuart stated that the most common ailments to hockey players at the Olympics were concussions, and injuries to shoulders and knees. He also noted that many of the NHL players at the Olympics came with existing injuries that Stuart and his staff had to treat. In addition to hockey, Stuart oversaw medical care for the entire US delegation to the 2022 Winter Olympics, which included international COVID-19 protocols and testing for doping in sport. He also worked for the US Coalition for the Prevention of Illness and Injury in Sport clinic to care for Olympic athletes from other countries.

== Personal life ==
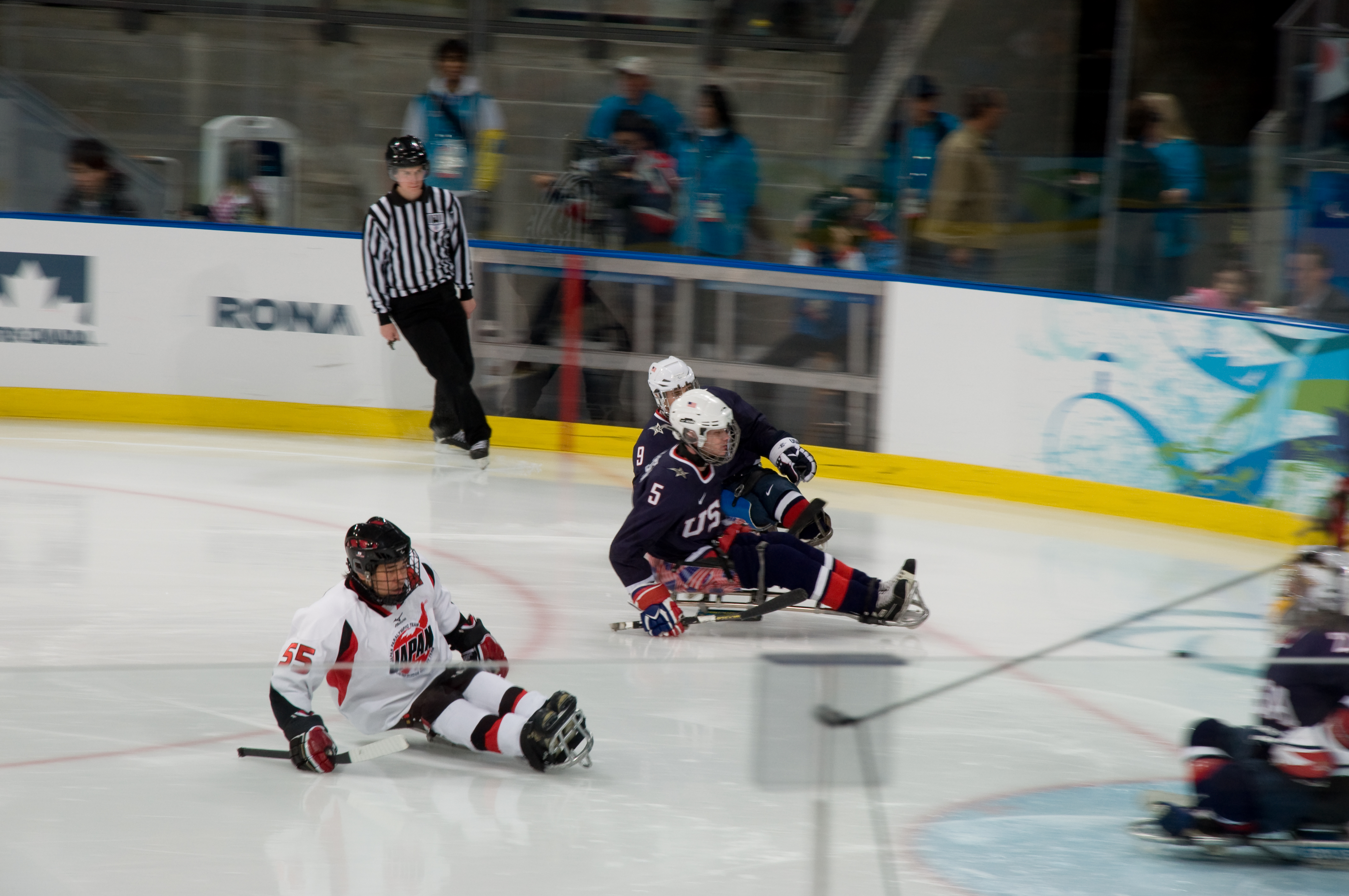
United States men's national sled hockey team

Stuart met his wife Nancy prior to high school, then married after he graduated from college. They reside in Rochester, Minnesota, and have four children. Their sons, Mike, Colin, and Mark, all played in the NHL. Stuart's daughter Cristin, was captain of the Boston College Eagles women's ice hockey team, and was married to NHL player Nate Thompson. Stuart's subsequent son-in-law became an orthopedic surgery resident at the Mayo Clinic, and his son Mike became an orthopedic sports medicine fellow at the Steadman Clinic in Vail, Colorado.

According to Stuart, his passion for hockey began with his four children playing for the Rochester Youth Hockey Association, which led to him becoming a billet for hockey. Inspired by success of the United States men's national sled hockey team, he established the Rochester Mustangs sled hockey team. As the team president, he co-ordinated volunteers for its fundraising and operations.

== Honors and awards ==
Stuart has received multiple awards for his research and writing; including the Hughston Award from the American Journal of Sports Medicine in 2003, an achievement award from the American Academy of Orthopaedic Surgeons in 2012, a merit award for co-authoring Your Child's Concussion from the National Resource Center for Health Information Technology in 2013, the O'Donoghue Sports Injury Research Award from the American Orthopaedic Society for Sports Medicine in 2014, the Patellofemoral Anatomy and Research Award from the Arthroscopy Association of North America as a co-author of "The Recurrent Instability of the Patella Score: A statistically-based model for prediction of long-term recurrence risk after first-time dislocation" in 2019, and the American Academy of Orthopaedic Surgeons Kappa Delta Award for outstanding orthopedic research in co-authoring "Predictors of Clinical Outcome Following Revision Anterior Cruciate Reconstruction" in 2019.

In 2008, Stuart received the "Doc" Counsilman Science Award for ice hockey from the United States Olympic Committee, and the USA Hockey Excellence in Safety Award. In 2014, he received the USA Hockey President's Award. He was inducted into the Rochester Lourdes High School athletics hall of fame, with receipt of the Gene Eiden Award in 2017.
