= Judith Deutsch =

Judith Deutsch may refer to:

- Judith Haspel (1918–2004), née Deutsch, Austrian swimmer
- Judith E. Deutsch, professor of physical therapy
