= Richard Bohannon =

American physical therapist

Richard W. Bohannon
- Education: University of North Carolina at Chapel Hill; North Carolina State University; Boston University
- Occupations: Physiotherapist, researcher, and professor
- Title: Principal at Physical Therapy Consultants; Professor at Campbell University

Richard W. Bohannon (born December 29, 1953) is an American physical therapist, clinician, and scholar. Since 2000, he has served as Principal of Physical Therapy Consultants in North Carolina.

Bohannon has served as Editor-in-Chief of the Journal of Human Muscle Performance, the Journal of the Geriatric Physical Therapy, and the Archives of Gerontology and Geriatrics. He has also published hundreds of research papers focused on physical therapy.

As a researcher, Bohannon has been cited more than 28,000 times, and he has He is a Fellow of the American Society of Neurorehabilitation, the Stroke Council of the American Heart Association, the American Physical Therapy Association, and the Gerontological Society of America.

== Education ==
Richard Bohannon received his BS and MS in Physical Therapy from University of North Carolina at Chapel Hill. He then received his Doctor of Education from North Carolina State University, followed by his Doctor of Physical Therapy from Boston University.

== Career ==
Bohannon served as a tenured Full Professor of Physical Therapy at the University of Connecticut in Storrs for over 30 years, serving twice as Acting Director. He also served as a tenured full professor at the University of Connecticut Health Center in Farmington. He was later named a Full Professor at Campbell University in North Carolina.

== Research ==
In addition to his physical therapy practice, Bohannon is a physical therapy researcher. He has more than four hundred publications, Bohannon has served as Editor-in-Chief of two peer-reviewed medical journals, the Journal of Human Muscle Performance (where he was also the Founding Editor) and the Journal of Geriatric Physical Therapy. In 1996 he received the Helen Hislop Award for Outstanding Contributions to the Professional Literature, in 2005 he was the recipient of the Marian Williams Award for Research in Physical Therapy, and in 2008 he was awarded the Jules Rothstein Golden Pen Award for Scientific Writing, each award given by the American Physical Therapy Association.

As a physical therapy researcher, Bohannon has more than 500 peer-reviewed publications. Richard's research has been mentioned in Roy J. Shephard's book Objective Monitoring of Physical Activity, and his papers have been cited in more than 40 different journals.

== Teaching ==
Bohannon served as a Professor of Physical Therapy at the University of Connecticut in Storrs and Professor of Medicine at the University of Connecticut Health Center in Farmington. He later became a Professor at Campbell University in North Carolina. He has also served as principal of Physical Therapy Consultants.

== Affiliations and fellowships ==
In 2010 he was named a Fellow of the American Society of Neurorehabilitation. He is also a Fellow of the Stroke Council of the American Heart Association and the American Physical Therapy Association. In 2018 he became a Fellow of the Gerontological Society of America.

- American Society of Neurorehabilitation
- Stroke Council of the American Heart Association
- American Physical Therapy Association
- Gerontological Society of America
- Society for Sarcopenia, Cachexia and Wasting Disorders (2020)
- American Academy of Cerebral Palsy and Developmental Medicine

== Recognition ==
In 1996 he received the Helen Hislop Award for Outstanding Contributions to the Professional Literature. In 2005 Bohannon was the recipient of the Marian Williams Award for Research in Physical Therapy, and in 2008 he was awarded the Jules Rothstein Golden Pen Award for Scientific Writing, given by the American Physical Therapy Association.
