= Mary McMillan =

American physical therapist

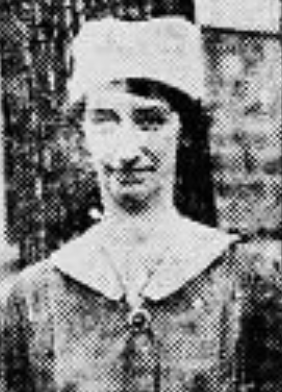
- Mary McMillan, from a 1919 newspaper
- Born: Mary Jennie Livingston McMillan; November 28, 1880; Boston, Massachusetts, U.S.
- Died: October 24, 1959 (age 78); Boston, Massachusetts, U.S.
- Occupation: Physical therapist

Mary Jennie Livingston McMillan (November 28, 1880 – October 24, 1959) was an American physical therapist, and the founding president of the American Physical Therapy Association.

== Early life and education ==
McMillan was born in Hyde Park, Boston, the daughter of Archibald McMillan and Kate McMillan. Her father was born in Scotland. She was raised by Mary Livingston, an aunt in England, after her mother and sister died. She trained as a physical educator, and graduated from Liverpool Gymnasium College in 1905, with further training at hospitals in London.

== Career ==
McMillan worked in hospitals in Liverpool from 1914 to 1916 and in Maine from 1916 to 1918. In 1918 she began at Walter Reed Army Medical Center, where she was the first "reconstruction aide" in the new Division of Physical Reconstruction. She trained rehabilitation aides at Reed College to work with wounded and disabled soldiers. In 1921, she was founder and first president of the American Women's Physical Therapeutic Association, now known as the American Physical Therapy Association. She was also president of the Massachusetts Physical Therapy Association.

Between the wars, McMillan worked at a private orthopedic practice in Boston, and published a textbook, Massage and Therapeutic Exercise (1921). She taught summer courses in physiotherapy to army nurses at Harvard Medical School. In 1932, she became director of physiotherapy at Peking Union Medical College in China.

During World War II, McMillan worked at an American army hospital in Manila. She was held by Japanese authorities at Santo Tomas Internment Camp in the Philippines, and at Chapei prison camp in Shanghai, until 1944. She attended the 25th anniversary conference of the American Physical Therapy Association in 1946, and spoke about the organization's founding.

== Personal life and legacy ==
McMillan died in 1959, at the age of 78, in Boston. In 1963, the American Physical Therapy Association named its Mary McMillan Scholarship Award in her memory.
