= Pediatric concussion =

Head trauma that impacts the brain capacity

A pediatric concussion, also known as pediatric mild traumatic brain injury (mTBI), is a head trauma that impacts the brain capacity. Concussion can affect functional, emotional, cognitive and physical factors and can occur in people of all ages. Symptoms following after the concussion vary and may include confusion, disorientation, lightheadedness, nausea, vomiting, blurred vision, loss of consciousness (LOC) and environment sensitivity. Concussion symptoms may vary based on the type, severity and location of the head injury. Concussion symptoms in infants, children, and adolescents often appear immediately after the injury, however, some symptoms may arise multiple days following the injury leading to a concussion. The majority of pediatric patients recover from the symptoms within one month (4 weeks) following the injury. 10-30% of children and adolescents have a higher risk of a delayed recovery or of experiencing concussion symptoms that are persisting.

A medical assessment by a physician or nurse practitioner is required if a concussion is suspected in an infant, child, or adolescent to rule out a more serious head injury and diagnose the concussion. Treatment for concussion includes a short cognitive and physical period of rest followed by gradual return to activity and school. Resting for more than 1–2 days is not recommended. Prescribed physical exercise may be helpful for recovery as early as 48–72 hours after the injury, however, all activities that have an inherent risk of another injury such as hitting the head or falling should be avoided completely until medically cleared by a doctor. Clinical practice guidelines do not suggest missing more than a week of school.

Common causes of a pediatric concussion include falls, motor vehicle accidents, sports-related injuries, and blunt force trauma. Approximately 48% of concussions consequently originate from falls in pediatric patients. Within the United States, concussions resulting from sports-related injuries indicate that 3.8 million patients sustain this trauma each year.

Concussions are a common head trauma with an estimated amount of 16% of children over the age of 10 having already experienced at least one head injury requiring immediate medical attention. Prevention for concussions involves reducing common risks in the youth; wearing a helmet to avoid sports-related head trauma. Treatment includes an initial period of 1–2 days of relative rest followed by a progressive return to physical and mental activities.

== Symptoms and signs ==
The symptoms can typically be included in four major categories: physical, cognitive, emotional, and sleep-related changes. Depending on the age group of the patient, the display of symptoms and signs may vary.

Table showing commonly reported symptoms of pediatric concussion
Physical	Cognitive	Emotional	Sleep
Headache; Lightheadedness; Difficulty Balancing; Light and noise sensitivity; Fatigue; Blurry or double vision; Nausea or vomiting	Confusion; Difficulty focusing; Difficulty in recalling information; Stagnant behaviour; Problems in academics	More emotionally sensitive; Easily frustrated; Often upset or nervous; Irritable	Irregular sleep patterns; Abnormally long or short sleep durations; Easily awoken during sleep; Feeling of somnolence

A pediatric concussion can lead to an immediate or delayed onset of symptoms. Immediate onset of symptoms includes physical impacts, such as dizziness, headache, anterograde or retrograde amnesia, loss of consciousness, vomiting and more. Delayed onset of symptoms may occur a few hours or days after the injury. The delayed symptoms involve all the physical, emotional and cognitive changes.

The symptoms of pediatric concussion can differ between babies, toddlers and older children. Babies, aged from birth to one-year-old, are usually unable to communicate their pain or emotions verbally. Therefore, more physical symptoms of pediatric concussion will be administered. This includes excessive crying when slightly moving the baby's head, different portrayal of irritability such as persistent crying, fever, or poor appetite, distinctive changes in the baby's sleeping habits, vomiting, or a visible physical injury on the baby's head.

Toddlers, aged from 12 to 36 months, might be able to communicate vocally about symptoms. Symptoms will potentially include a headache, nausea, vomiting as physical symptoms. The portrayal of behavioral changes, such as a sudden change in sleeping patterns or excessive crying, and a loss of interest, such as hobbies, may also be seen.

In older children, aged two or more, a pediatric concussion may lead to detectable modifications in the patients' cognition and behavior. Similar to toddlers, they may be vocal about symptoms. This includes feelings of dizziness, problems balancing, having blurry vision, increased sensitivity to light and noise, trouble paying attention, difficulty in memory, various mood changes, fatigue, and irregular sleep patterns.

== Diagnosis of pediatric concussion ==
All children and adolescents with suspected concussion require a medical assessment from a physician or nurse practitioner to accurately diagnose concussion and ensure that the child or adolescent does not have a more severe form of brain injury (TBI), an injury to their cervical spine, or other mental health or neurological conditions that may have similar symptoms to concussion. There is no single physical or physiological test, imaging technique, or bodily fluids test to directly diagnose a pediatric concussion.

=== Glasgow coma scale ===
The Glasgow coma scale (GCS) is a clinical scale utilized to measure the severity of the concussion. The normal GCS can be used for children above the age of two, and a pediatric GCS has also been developed to assess the symptoms for children under the age of two.

Both the normal and pediatric GCS aims to test the eye, verbal and motor responses. For each test, the scale value ranges from not testable (NT) to six, increasing in severity with higher numbers. Each of the values recorded is indicative of the person's best response provided during the examination. If the sum of the GCS is below eight or nine, the brain injury, such as concussion, is classified as severe, such as being in a coma. If the sum of the GCS is above or same as thirteen, it is classified to be a minor brain injury. Any value of GCS between nine and thirteen will be classified as moderate injury.

=== Sideline testing ===
Sideline testing is one of the physical assessments that can be made immediately, which usually utilized for a sports-related injury. There are various examples of sideline testing, including Sideline Concussion Assessment Tool (SCAT5), Child Sideline Concussion Assessment Tool (ChildSCAT5), Balance Error Score System, Test of Individual Stability, King-Devick Test (KD), and Test of Visual–Motor function.

==== SCAT6 / ChildSCAT6 ====
The Sideline Concussion Assessment Tool 6 has two major categories of carrying out an on-field assessment and off-field assessment. For the on-field, immediate assessment, several different physical examinations such as noting observable concussion signs, memory tests and observation of the level of consciousness using GCS as well as a cervical spine assessment can be done. For off-field assessments, it can be carried out in a clinical setting, with assessments such as careful evaluation of the symptoms, and the utilization of a neurological screen. The SCAT6 test is used for children above age thirteen. ChildSCAT6 is similar to the use of SCAT6, however, it is only used to evaluate children from age five to thirteen.

==== Balance Error Score System ====
The Balance Error Score System (BESS) examination measures postural stability which can be affected with the occurrence of a concussion. BESS aims to demonstrate the individual's stability by testing the balancing ability of the individual for three different positions on firm and foam surfaces.

==== King-Devick test ====
The King-Devick test is to assess the visual–motor function of the individual. Three different sets of test cards are provided to the individuals, with different form of lines that have numbers in the middle. The individual is told to read the numbers of the card from the top-left corner to the bottom-right corner, aloud and as fast and accurately as possible. The time taken to complete the task is measured and the number of errors (if any) committed while reading the three cards are noted. A change from baseline greater than one second compared to the individual's baseline time or the commission of any errors is considered to be concerning for possible evidence of concussion. The test assists the evaluation of impairment in the eye movements, language abilities as well as attention, which is important to assess, as such factors can be affected by a concussion.

=== Office evaluation ===
The office evaluation is conducted to confirm that the individual has a sustained concussion. To do this, it requires a comprehensive concussion evaluation, including detailed records of the injury, symptomatic scale, neurological exam, evaluation of the behavior and cognition, visual–motor function evaluation, balancing tests, and assessment for risk factors for slower recovery.

==== Detailed records of the initial injury ====
It is critical to record down details of the initial injury, such as whether the symptoms of concussion were present immediately, how the injury occurred, or the severity of the symptoms presented. These records may be necessary and helpful for medical professionals to accurately identify the significance of the injury, as well as predict the recommended duration of recovery.

==== Symptom scales ====
Symptom scales can be varied among various age groups, and it can be provided to help health care providers to assess. Different checklists can be used to measure the symptoms of concussion, such as the Graded Symptom Checklist (GSC), Post-Concussion Symptoms Survey (PCSS), and Rivermead Post-Concussion Symptom Questionnaire (RPCSQ). The GSC rates the symptoms based on severity, and it can be self-reported for individual ages 13 and over. The PCSS is also a self-report that measures the severity of symptoms; however, it has not been yet tested in individuals under the age of eleven. RPCSQ asks individuals to report the comparisons of the severity of symptoms prior to the injury and after the injury. These questionnaires can be self-reported or be reported by the parent or guardian.

==== Neurological exam ====
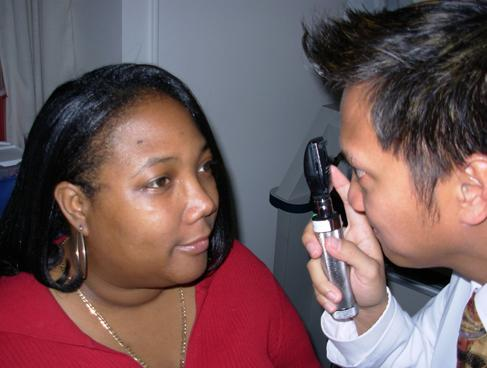
Image to show the medical professional conducting a funduscopic exam using a funduscope. The funduscopic method is used to examine the fundus, which consists of the retina, optic disc, and blood vessels. This examination can detect any eye problems, such as glaucoma, optic nerve problems or macular degeneration. It can be useful when recognizing any eye injuries caused by a concussion.

Various neurological examinations can be initiated to indicate areas affected by pediatric concussion. This includes the examination of the mental status, fundoscopic (ophthalmoscopy) exam to assess eye coordination, cranial nerve testing to evaluate the brain, strength, sensory analysis, reflexes and coordination, and walking.

==== Vestibular ocular evaluation ====
The vestibular–ocular evaluation is the screening of visual–motor functions. Visual–motor screening evaluates the cognitive control of the eye movement which utilizes several pathways of the brain. These pathways, such as the frontoparietal circuits and subcortical nuclei, are susceptible to injuries in concussion. Therefore, the evaluation of the visual–motor function, the King-Devick Test as an example, can indicate the severity of the concussion, which can then be associated with the duration needed for recovery.

==== Balance assessment ====
The balance assessment is useful in observing the abnormalities in balancing abilities, which is a commonly reported symptom of concussed individuals. When conducting the balance test, it is important to focus on the footwear of the individual, as it may impact the results of the balance test. Therefore, it is recommended to remove footwear prior to balance testing. Such balance assessments include SCAT5, and the BESS.

==== Cognitive screen ====
The Acute Concussion Evaluate (ACE) tool and the SCAT5 can be utilized to screen the cognitive status of the individual. These assessment tools can evaluate cognition, such as memory. Nonetheless, it lacks in its ability to judge attention, a factor that may be affected due to concussion. Poor performance in the cognitive screen testing can suggest slower recovery or even a referral to a neuropsychologist.

==== Neuropsychological evaluation ====
The neuropsychological evaluation facilitates the analysis of factors that may be affected by concussion such as learning, memory, efficacy, thinking process, reaction time, and attention. This is achieved through different assessments such as the Performance Validity Test (PVTs) and Symptom Validity Tests (SVTs), which allows the interpretation of any injuries made by concussion. It can recognize the cognitive status of the patients as well as indicate the recommended duration of recovery based on the severity of the injury.

==== Neuroimaging ====
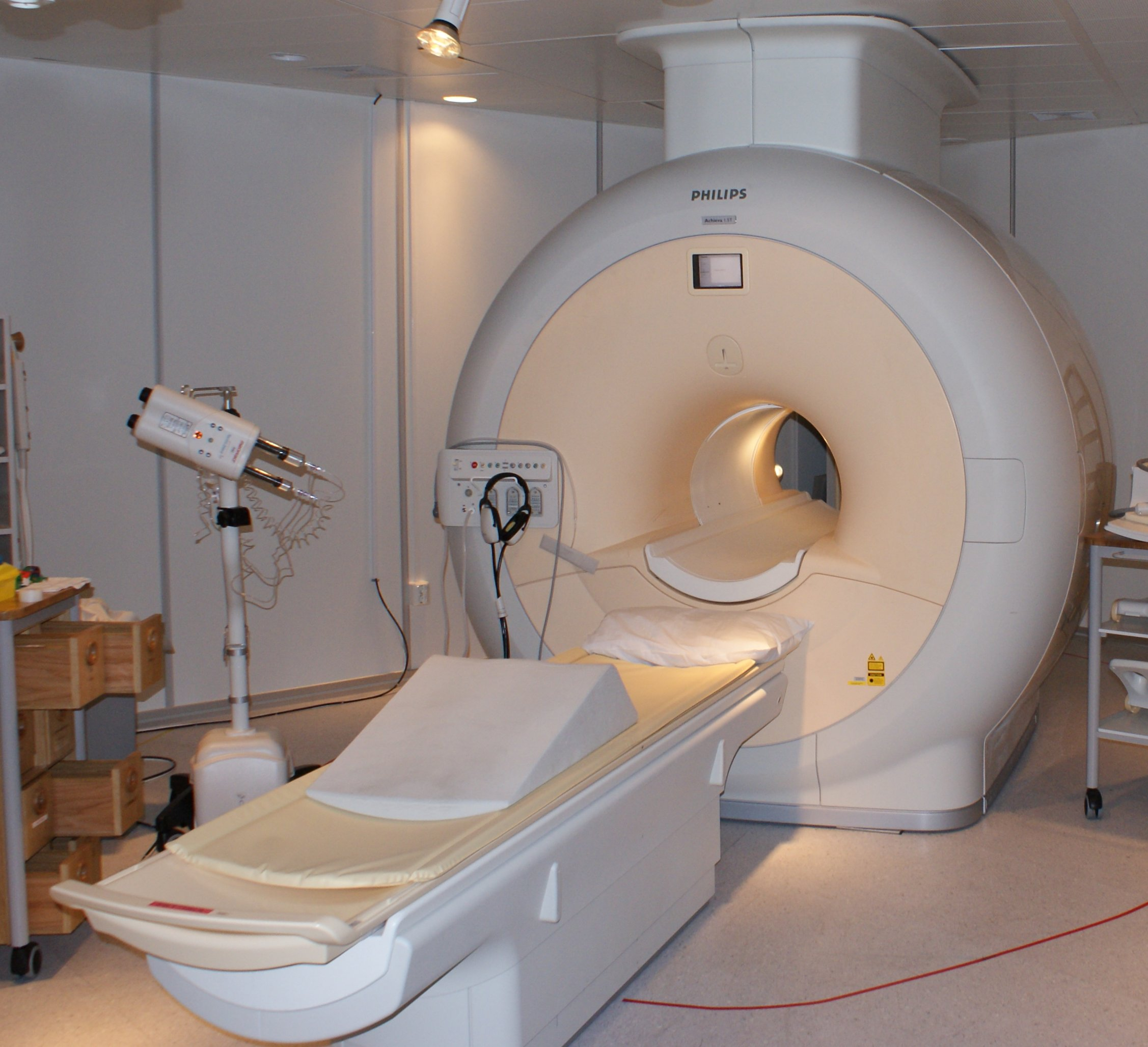
Image to show the MRI machine, which can be used to identify any brain injuries through imaging. As MRI involves a strong magnetic field, the patients to take precautions, as the strong magnetic field can exert strong power on magnetizable objects. Moreover, patients with claustrophobia can face difficulties staying inside the machine for a long time, due to its limited space. Different methods of familiarizing the patient with the machine or easing the discomfort should be adapted prior to the use of an MRI machine.

There are various methods of neuroimaging, commonly including magnetic resonance imaging (MRI) and computed tomography (CT). Neuroimaging techniques can detect changes occurring in the brain through technology, further implying brain damage caused by a concussion. Neuroimaging is a less common technique utilized for pediatrics, as there may be obstacles such as procedural difficulties or discomfort of a pediatric patient.

== Treatment ==
Infants, adolescents and children suspected of having a concussion are recommended to seek immediate medical attention. Those with red flag symptoms should go to the nearest emergency room or call an ambulance (emergency medical service transport). Treatments vary to provide recovery from the trauma; specific treatment depends on the severity and area of injury. Medical clearance is not necessary to return to school for pediatric patients. However, observation is required to monitor return-to-school and activities. Re-injury should be avoided to prevent long-term consequences and permanent brain damage.

=== Rest and return to activities ===
Immediately after a person hits their head and concussion is suspected they must be removed from the activity and require a medical assessment before returning to play. After an initial rest of 24 – 48 hours, activities should be gradually started again. Activities involving contact, collision or any risk of another hit to the body or head need to be completely avoided until medical clearance is granted.

=== Return-to-school ===
After a brief 1–2 days of rest, school activities should be started. Absences of more than 1 week are discouraged to avoid deterioration of the manifestations and are recommended to take an active rehabilitation instead.

=== Medication ===
Pharmacologic treatment at the present stage has been shown to be unable to speed the recovery of pediatric concussion; nevertheless, the medication can be prescribed to alleviate signs and symptoms of sleep disturbances, headaches, cognitive and emotional inflictions, of the injury. Melatonin can assist patients experiencing sleep disturbances. Medication utilized for headaches like naproxen, ibuprofen, acetaminophen, and oxaprozin can be applied to lessen symptoms in the short term; though, recent studies indicate patients improved in the ailment after discontinuation of the treatment. However, medication and other forms of drugs are advised to not be administered unless prescribed by a doctor due to the potential detrimental implications on recovery.

== Prognosis ==
The majority of pediatric patients recover completely from concussion; some may experience prolonged recuperation. Around 70-80% recover without difficulties after one to three months following the concussion. Each child's recovery follows a unique direction; an accurate prediction based on a single factor is unable to determine the outcome of the child.

Health care professionals may occasionally employ prognostic tools to provide assistance to determine a predictive outcome, such as validated symptoms scales, cognitive tests and balance testing. Although these tests are incapable of being a strong predictive tool for outcomes, they are able to assess recovery from the pediatric concussion. These tools display greater benefits towards older adolescents for determining predictions for prognosis.

In pediatric patients at risk for persisting symptoms, including factors such as premorbid history, demographics and injury characteristics, health care professionals may closely monitor these children and refer to interventions if indications do not resolve within four to six weeks. Children suspected of a threat for delayed recovery are highly likely for intervention and will assess prognostic risk factors for effectively counselling patients.

Presently, there is no test to accurately determine the recovery estimate of pediatric patients who had a concussion.

== Epidemiology ==
Concussions are one of the most common traumatic head injuries involved with sports or injuries; children under the age of eighteen having the highest rate among all age groups. Among various sports that were observed, soccer was found to have the highest number of concussions followed by football and basketball, respectively. Male pediatric patients had more incidence of concussions than females within sports-related concussion occurrences. Within different levels of schools (elementary, middle, and high school), the incidence of concussions was highest in high schoolers (43.1%) compared to elementary (25%) and middle schoolers (31.9%). Most of the concussions in a school setting were associated with Physical Education (PE) class being sports-related as well as opposed to during recess, walking in the hall, or in a classroom. Among children that were diagnosed with concussions, there was not a significant difference in rate of concussions between males and females.

Despite the pediatric population having the highest rate of concussions among all age groups, the pediatric population has the lowest rate of loss of consciousness accompanying the concussion among all age groups. Among children attending school following a pediatric concussion, 13.7% continued to be symptomatic 3 months afterwards; this could not be explained by trauma, family dysfunction, or psychological adjustment.

The most recent estimated range of concussions among patients 18 years of age or younger is between 1.1 million to 1.9 million concussions annually. The estimate is a wide range due to the difficulty of accurately reporting because of differing definitions used, lack of surveillance systems, and possible underreporting of the condition. Also, there are differences on what type of patients are used as study subjects within studies to estimate the incidence. Many studies use emergency department visits as a proxy for the estimate; however, recently it was found that about 75% of 5–17 years old patients visited their primary care provider to be diagnosed with a concussion.

The rate of incidence of concussions, in general, decreases with age; the younger generation experience head traumas more often. However, overall the number of pediatric patients diagnosed with a concussion has increased from 2013 to 2018. This increase of diagnoses could be related to increased frequency of injury, increased participation in sport activities, and more awareness around concussions. The awareness in turn has led to an increased production of policies and procedures dealing with detection, managing symptoms, and return-to-play protocols among sports organizations and schools.

== See also ==
- Concussion
- Pediatrics
- Prevention of concussions
