= Physical Therapy & Rehabilitation Journal =

- Discipline: Physical therapy
- Language: English
- Edited by: Steven Z. George

Publication details
- History: 1921–present
- Publisher: Oxford University Press on behalf of the American Physical Therapy Association
- Frequency: Monthly
- Impact factor: 3.5 (2023)

Standard abbreviations
- ISO 4: Phys. Ther. Rehabil. J.

Indexing
- CODEN: PTHEA7
- ISSN: 0031-9023 (print); 1538-6724 (web)
- LCCN: 72620955
- OCLC no.: 1762333

Links
- Journal homepage; Online access; Online archive

The Physical Therapy & Rehabilitation Journal is a monthly peer-reviewed medical journal covering research about physical therapy. It is published by Oxford University Press on behalf of the American Physical Therapy Association and was established in 1921. According to the Journal Citation Reports, the journal has a 2023 impact factor of 3.5.

The journal obtained its current title in 2021. Previous names include P.T. Review (1921-1926), Physiotherapy Review (1926-1948), Physical Therapy Review (1948-1961), Journal of the American Physical Therapy Association (1962-1963), and Physical Therapy (1964-2020).
