= Judith E. Deutsch =

Judith E. Deutsch, PT, PhD, FAPTA, is a professor of physical therapy in the Department of Rehabilitation & Movement Sciences at Rutgers University. She is also the director of the Research in Virtual Environments and Rehabilitation Sciences Lab.

Deutsch's research involves the use of technology, such as virtual reality and gaming, into clinical practice to enhance functional recovery for individuals with neurologic conditions. Due to her contribution to the science of the profession, she received the Neurology Section Service Award, the Lucy Blair Service Award and Catherine Worthingham Fellowship from APTA.

Deutsch was the Editor in Chief of the Journal of Neurologic Physical Therapy from 1999-2008. She currently serves on the Editorial Boards of Neurorehabilitation & Neural Repair, Games for Health and Journal of NeuroEngineering and Rehabilitation.
