= Mark Stuart (ice hockey) =

American ice hockey player (born 1984)

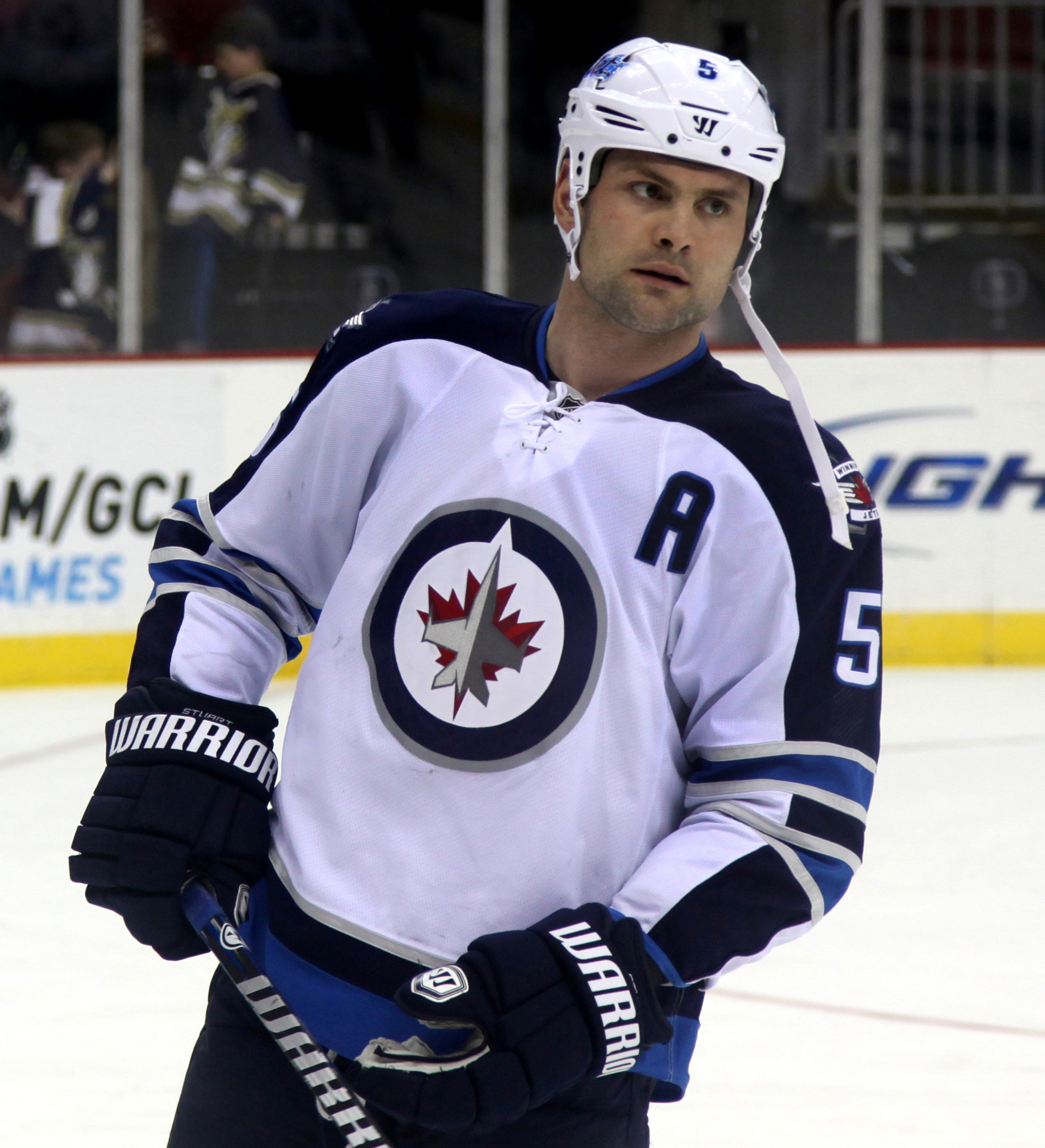
- Stuart with the Winnipeg Jets in 2013
- Born: April 27, 1984 (age 42) Rochester, Minnesota, U.S.
- Height: 6 ft 2 in (188 cm)
- Weight: 215 lb (98 kg; 15 st 5 lb)
- Position: Defense
- Shot: Left
- Played for: Boston Bruins; Atlanta Thrashers; Winnipeg Jets; Adler Mannheim
- National team: United States
- NHL draft: 21st overall, 2003; Boston Bruins
- Playing career: 2006–2018
- Coaching career

Biographical details
- Education: Colorado College

Coaching career (HC unless noted)
- 2018–2019: Manitoba Moose (manager)
- 2020–2021: Vermont (assistant)
- 2021–2022: Colorado College (assistant)
- 2022–2026: Edmonton Oilers (assistant)

Mark Eugene Stuart (born April 27, 1984) is an American ice hockey coach and former professional defenseman. He played for the Boston Bruins and the Atlanta Thrashers/Winnipeg Jets of the National Hockey League (NHL) and Adler Mannheim in the Deutsche Eishockey Liga (DEL). He was drafted by the Boston Bruins 21st overall in the first round of the 2003 NHL entry draft. He is the younger brother of former NHL forward, Colin and defenseman Mike, and is the son of Mayo Clinic physician Michael Stuart.

== Playing career ==
=== Amateur ===
Stuart attended Colorado College in Colorado Springs for three years prior to going pro. Stuart likely would have left a year earlier had the NHL not been involved in a lockout. During his junior year, Stuart was the captain of the Tigers and led them to the NCAA Frozen Four, where they lost to eventual champion and in-state rival, the University of Denver.

=== Professional ===
On November 7, 2006, after undergoing off-season knee surgery, Stuart was sent down to the Boston Bruins' American Hockey League affiliate, the Providence Bruins for conditioning purposes until he was recalled by Boston on November 20, 2006. After the conclusion of the 2007–08 Boston Bruins season, Mark Stuart was also selected to play in the 2008 IIHF World Ice Hockey Championships as a member of Team USA. Also, as of April 26, 2008 Stuart was named to be one of the alternate captains for Team USA in the 2008 international event.

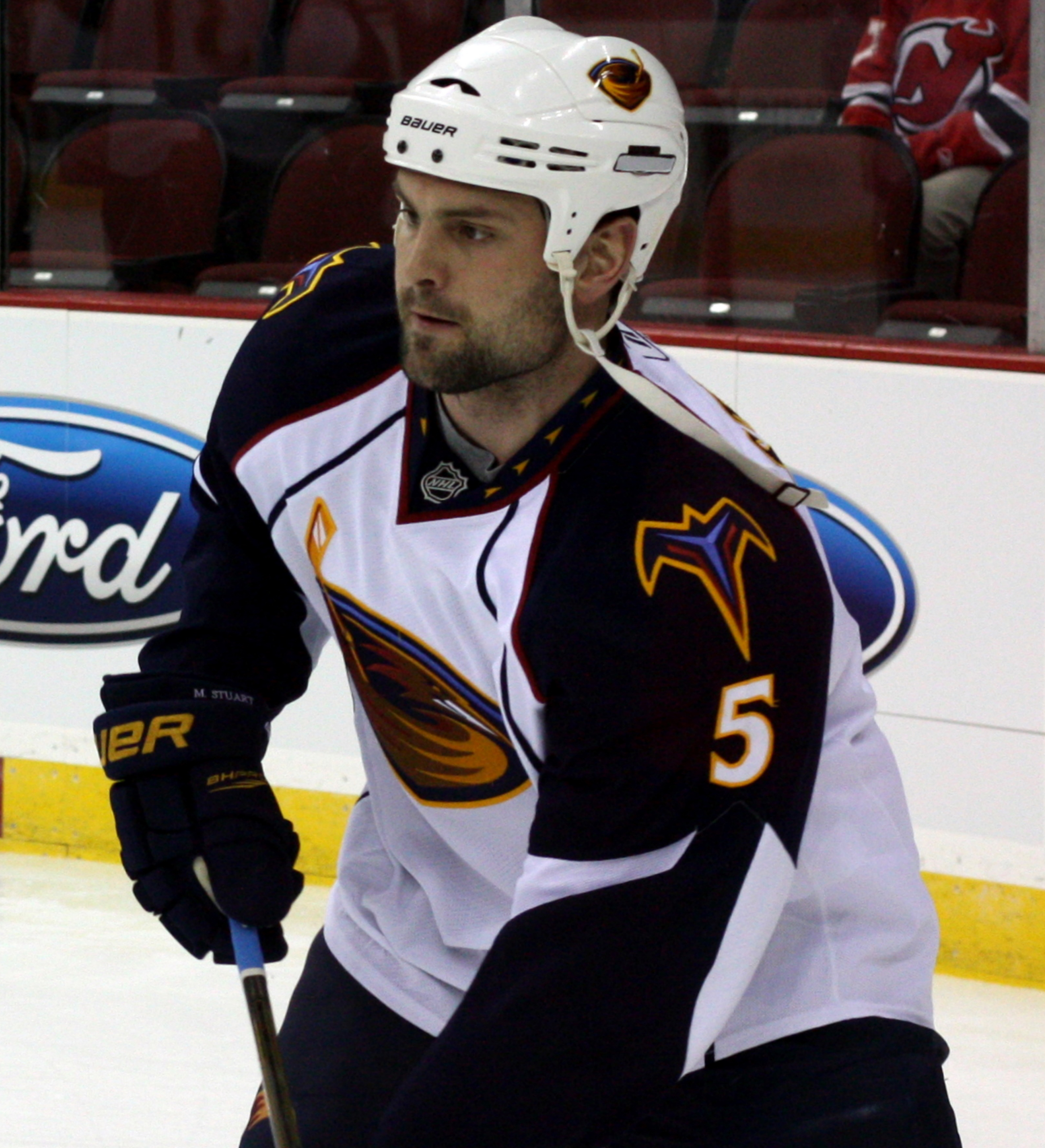
Stuart with the Atlanta Thrashers in March 2011

On February 18, 2011, Stuart was traded by Boston to the Atlanta Thrashers along with Blake Wheeler for Rich Peverley and Boris Valabik. Ten days later, the team signed him to a three-year deal worth $5.1 million. In 2011, Stuart's rights where transferred in the relocation of the Atlanta Thrashers to the Winnipeg Jets. During the 2012 NHL lockout, Stuart signed on to play for the Florida Everblades of the ECHL. On March 5, 2014, Stuart signed a 4-year, $10.5 million contract extension with the Winnipeg Jets.

After seven seasons within the Thrashers/Jets franchise and after suffering a decline in his effectiveness throughout the 2016–17 season, Stuart was placed on waivers by the Jets in order to buy-out the remaining year of his contract on June 30, 2017.

On September 11, 2017, the Chicago Blackhawks signed Stuart to a professional tryout. On September 21, 2017, Stuart was released from the Blackhawks roster following training camp.

On October 11, 2017, Stuart signed to play in Europe with Adler Mannheim of the Deutsche Eishockey Liga (DEL).

== International play ==
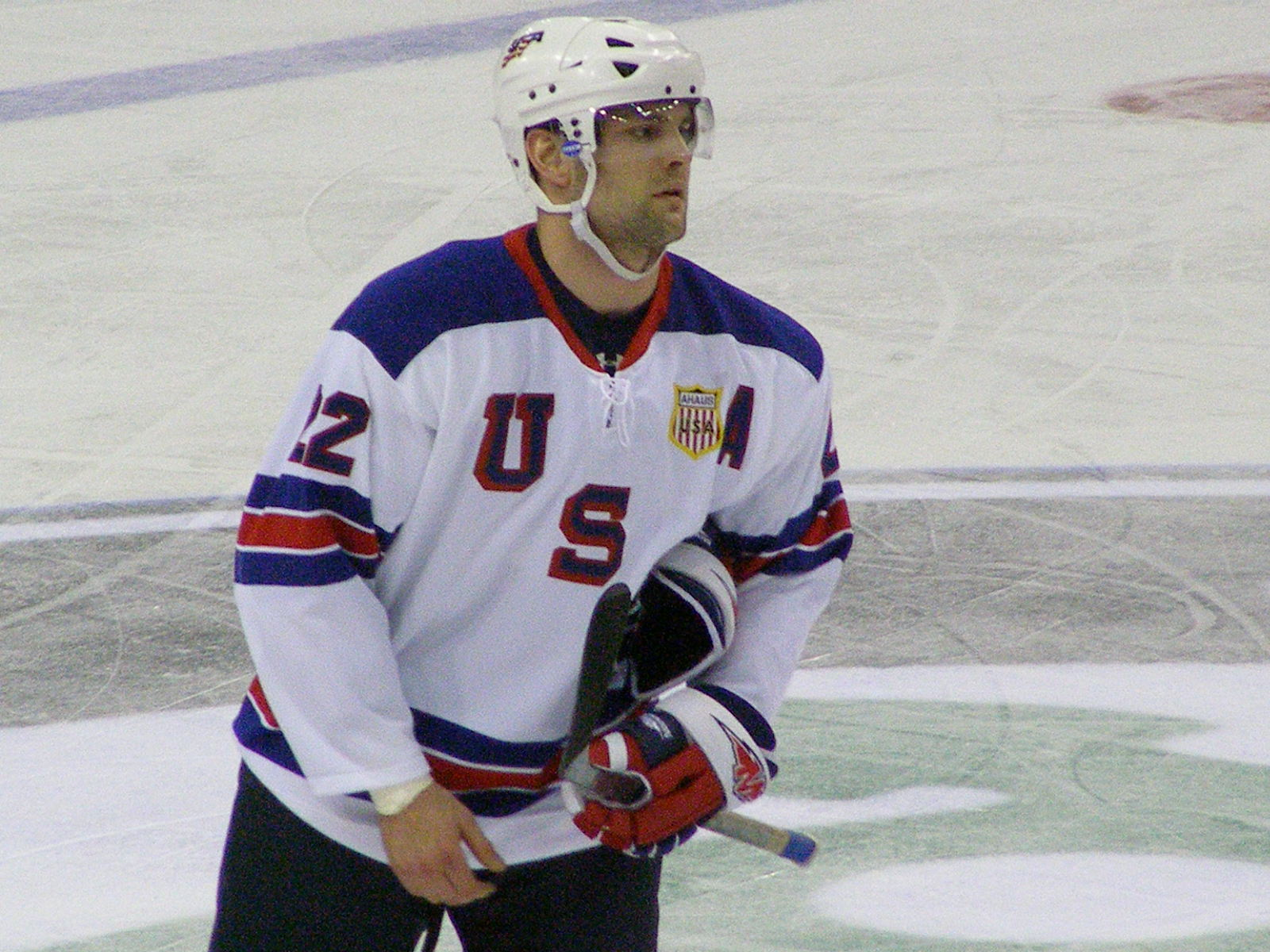
- Stuart during the 2008 IIHF World Championship

Medal record

Men's ice hockey

Representing the United States

World Junior Championships
Gold medal – first place	2004 Finland	

World U18 Championships
Gold medal – first place	2002 Slovakia	

Stuart first played for the United States during the 2002 IIHF World U18 Championships. He captained the United States to its first World U18 Championship gold medal. The next year, Stuart played in the 2003 World Junior Ice Hockey Championships where he had one assist in seven games. During the 2004 World Junior Ice Hockey Championships he had two assists and captained the United States to its first World Junior Championship gold medal.

In 2008, Stuart competed in the 2008 IIHF World Championship where he was one of the team's alternated captains. In 2011, he accepted an invitation to join the USA for the 2011 IIHF World Championship and was named team captain.

== Career statistics ==
=== Regular season and playoffs ===
			Regular season					Playoffs
Season	Team	League	GP	G	A	Pts	PIM	GP	G	A	Pts	PIM
1999–2000	Rochester Lourdes High School	HS-MN	28	19	22	41		—	—	—	—	—
1999–2000	Rochester Mustangs	USHL	4	0	0	0	6	—	—	—	—	—
2000–01	US NTDP U17	USDP	12	1	5	6	6	—	—	—	—	—
2000–01	US NTDP U18	NAHL	52	2	11	13	114	—	—	—	—	—
2001–02	US NTDP Juniors	USHL	12	0	1	1	25	—	—	—	—	—
2001–02	US NTDP Juniors	NAHL	9	0	1	1	18	—	—	—	—	—
2001–02	US NTDP U18	USDP	40	9	9	18		—	—	—	—	—
2002–03	Colorado College	WCHA	38	3	17	20	81	—	—	—	—	—
2003–04	Colorado College	WCHA	37	4	11	15	100	—	—	—	—	—
2004–05	Colorado College	WCHA	45	2	13	18	94	—	—	—	—	—
2005–06	Providence Bruins	AHL	60	4	3	7	76	6	0	0	0	25
2005–06	Boston Bruins	NHL	17	1	1	2	10	—	—	—	—	—
2006–07	Boston Bruins	NHL	15	0	1	1	14	—	—	—	—	—
2006–07	Providence Bruins	AHL	49	4	16	20	62	3	0	1	1	9
2007–08	Boston Bruins	NHL	82	4	4	8	81	7	0	1	1	8
2008–09	Boston Bruins	NHL	82	5	12	17	76	11	0	1	1	7
2009–10	Boston Bruins	NHL	56	2	5	7	80	4	0	0	0	6
2010–11	Boston Bruins	NHL	31	1	4	5	23	—	—	—	—	—
2010–11	Atlanta Thrashers	NHL	23	1	0	1	24	—	—	—	—	—
2011–12	Winnipeg Jets	NHL	80	3	11	14	98	—	—	—	—	—
2012–13	Florida Everblades	ECHL	9	2	1	3	12	—	—	—	—	—
2012–13	Winnipeg Jets	NHL	42	2	2	4	53	—	—	—	—	—
2013–14	Winnipeg Jets	NHL	69	2	11	13	101	—	—	—	—	—
2014–15	Winnipeg Jets	NHL	70	2	12	14	69	4	1	1	2	2
2015–16	Winnipeg Jets	NHL	64	1	2	3	66	—	—	—	—	—
2016–17	Winnipeg Jets	NHL	42	2	2	4	27	—	—	—	—	—
2017–18	Adler Mannheim	DEL	41	0	5	5	42	10	1	1	2	4
NHL totals			673	26	67	93	722	26	1	3	4	23

=== International ===
Year	Team	Event	Result	GP	G	A	Pts	PIM
2002	United States	WJC18	1st place, gold medalist(s)	8	1	2	3	29
2003	United States	WJC	4th	7	0	1	1	2
2004	United States	WJC	1st place, gold medalist(s)	6	0	2	2	4
2008	United States	WC	6th	7	0	0	0	4
2011	United States	WC	8th	7	1	0	1	8
Junior totals				21	1	5	6	35
Senior totals				14	1	0	1	12

== Awards and honors ==
Award	Year
NCAA
All-WCHA Rookie Team	2003
All-WCHA Third Team	2004
All-WCHA Second Team	2005
WCHA Defensive Player of the Year	2005
AHCA West First-Team All-American	2004–05
NHL
Dan Snyder Memorial Award	2011-12

Sporting positions
Preceded by Hannu Toivonen	Boston Bruins first-round draft pick 2003	Succeeded by Matt Lashoff
Awards and achievements
Preceded by Ryan Caldwell	WCHA Defensive Player of the Year; 2004–05	Succeeded by Matt Carle
