= Journal of Neurologic Physical Therapy =

- Discipline: Physical therapy
- Language: English
- Edited by: Edelle Field-Fote

Publication details
- Former name(s): Neurology Report
- History: 1977-present
- Publisher: Lippincott Williams & Wilkins on behalf of the Neurology Section of the American Physical Therapy Association (United States)
- Frequency: Quarterly
- Impact factor: 4.655 (2021)

Standard abbreviations
- ISO 4: J. Neurol. Phys. Ther.

Indexing
- ISSN: 1557-0576 (print); 1557-0584 (web)
- OCLC no.: 53435822

Links
- Journal homepage; Online access; Online archive

The Journal of Neurologic Physical Therapy is a monthly peer-reviewed medical journal covering research on physical therapy. It is published by Lippincott Williams & Wilkins and is the official journal of the Neurology Section of the American Physical Therapy Association and the Associação Brasileira de Fisiotherapia Neurofunctional. The journal was established in 1977 as Neurology Report, obtaining its current title in 2003.

== Abstracting and indexing ==
The journal is abstracted and indexed in:

- CINAHL
- Current Contents/Clinical Medicine
- EBSCO databases
- Index Medicus/MEDLINE/PubMed
- ProQuest databases
- Science Citation Index Expanded
- Scopus

According to the Journal Citation Reports, the journal has a 2014 impact factor of 1.766.
