= Colin Stuart (ice hockey) =

American ice hockey player (born 1982)

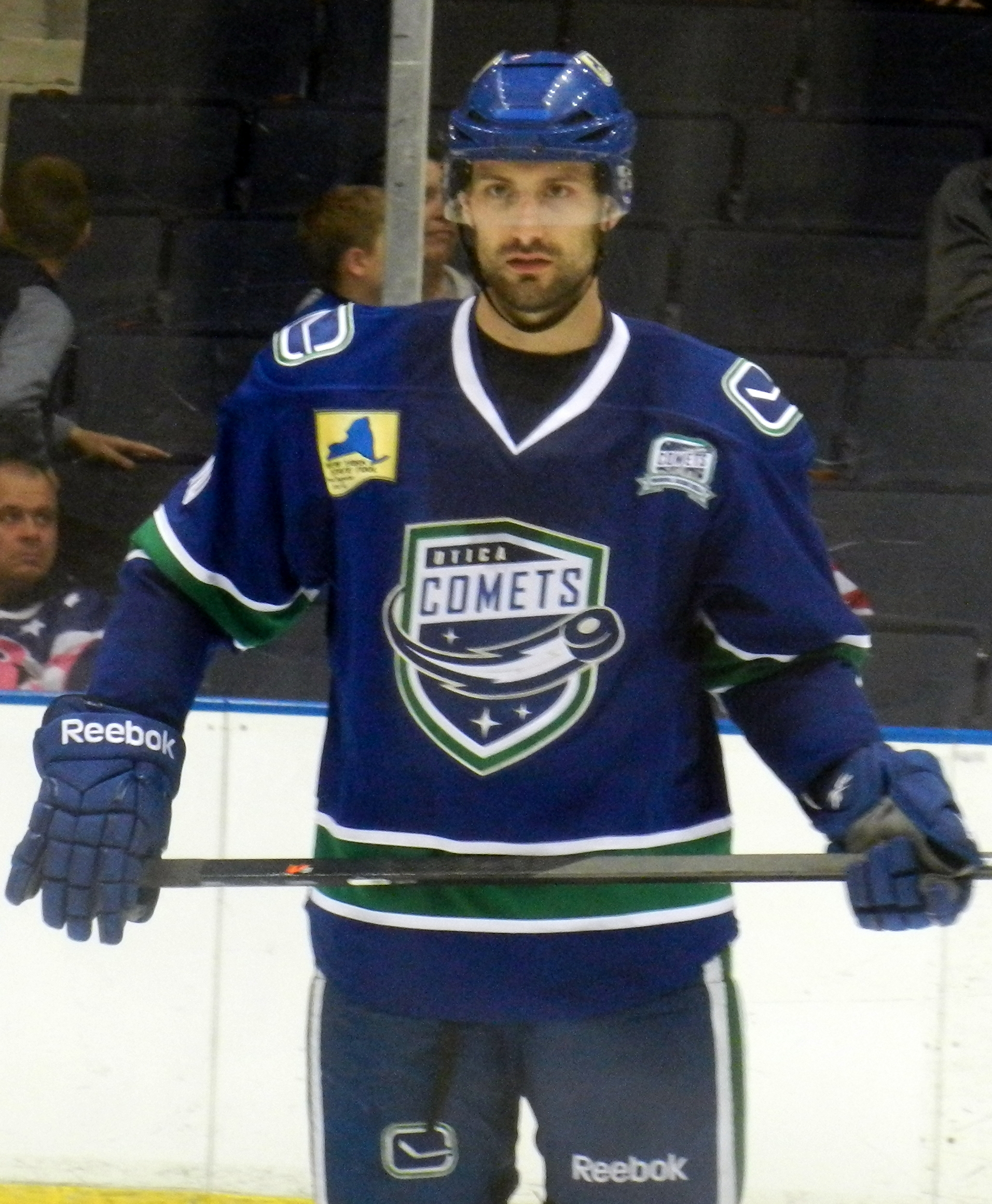
- Stuart with the Utica Comets in 2013
- Born: July 8, 1982 (age 44) Rochester, Minnesota, U.S.
- Height: 6 ft 2 in (188 cm)
- Weight: 204 lb (93 kg; 14 st 8 lb)
- Position: Left wing
- Shot: Left
- Played for: Atlanta Thrashers; Buffalo Sabres; Iserlohn Roosters; Malmö Redhawks
- National team: United States
- NHL draft: 135th overall, 2001; Atlanta Thrashers
- Playing career: 2004–2015

Colin Stuart (born July 8, 1982) is an American former professional ice hockey winger. He played with the Atlanta Thrashers and Buffalo Sabres in the National Hockey League. He has two brothers Mark Stuart and Mike Stuart, and a sister Cristin Stuart and is the son of Mayo Clinic physician Michael Stuart. As well as Nancy Stuart.

== Playing career ==
Stuart was drafted in the NHL by the Atlanta Thrashers with the 135th pick in the 2001 NHL entry draft from Colorado College. He joined the Thrashers organization in 2004 and was assigned to the American Hockey League's Chicago Wolves as well as playing five games for the ECHL's Gwinnett Gladiators. After two more seasons with the Wolves, Stuart made his NHL debut during the 2007–08 NHL season, playing 18 games and scoring 3 goals. He returned to the Wolves shortly afterwards and won the Calder Cup.

On July 1, 2009, Stuart was traded to the Toronto Maple Leafs along with Garnet Exelby for Pavel Kubina and the rights to Tim Stapleton. He was then shipped to the Calgary Flames on July 27, 2009, in the trade that brought Wayne Primeau to Toronto.

On July 7, 2011, Stuart re-signed with the Buffalo Sabres on a one-year contract.

On September 18, 2012, Stuart left North America as a free agent to sign with the Iserlohn Roosters in the Deutsche Eishockey Liga for one-year. During the 2012–13 season, Stuart established himself amongst the Roosters leadership group, and contributed with 21 points in 45 games.

On July 25, 2013, Stuart opted to return to the NHL and signed a one-year, two-way contract with the Vancouver Canucks. He was assigned to AHL inaugural affiliate, the Utica Comets, for the 2013–14 season, scoring 25 points in 54 games.

Stuart opted to continue his European career in the off-season, in signing a one-year deal with the Malmö Redhawks of the Swedish HockeyAllsvenskan on August 14, 2014. Mid-season, Stuart opted to leave Sweden and return to North America, signing in the AHL with the Providence Bruins.

On August 30, 2015, Stuart announced the end of his professional career after 11 seasons.

== Career statistics ==
=== Regular season and playoffs ===
			Regular season					Playoffs
Season	Team	League	GP	G	A	Pts	PIM	GP	G	A	Pts	PIM
1998–99	Rochester Lourdes High School	HSMN	23	22	32	54	—	—	—	—	—	—
1999–2000	Lincoln Stars	USHL	53	18	19	37	38	9	1	3	4	2
2000–01	Colorado College	WCHA	41	2	7	9	26	—	—	—	—	—
2001–02	Colorado College	WCHA	43	13	9	22	34	—	—	—	—	—
2002–03	Colorado College	WCHA	42	13	11	24	56	—	—	—	—	—
2003–04	Colorado College	WCHA	30	10	12	22	38	—	—	—	—	—
2004–05	Chicago Wolves	AHL	39	3	2	5	12	—	—	—	—	—
2004–05	Gwinnett Gladiators	ECHL	5	1	3	4	4	—	—	—	—	—
2005–06	Chicago Wolves	AHL	78	13	14	27	65	—	—	—	—	—
2006–07	Chicago Wolves	AHL	67	18	11	29	75	15	2	5	7	10
2007–08	Chicago Wolves	AHL	58	8	8	16	45	24	3	3	6	18
2007–08	Atlanta Thrashers	NHL	18	3	2	5	6	—	—	—	—	—
2008–09	Chicago Wolves	AHL	42	9	6	15	38	—	—	—	—	—
2008–09	Atlanta Thrashers	NHL	33	5	3	8	18	—	—	—	—	—
2009–10	Abbotsford Heat	AHL	67	17	19	36	36	3	0	0	0	6
2010–11	Portland Pirates	AHL	72	16	28	44	53	12	3	4	7	8
2010–11	Buffalo Sabres	NHL	3	0	0	0	2	—	—	—	—	—
2011–12	Rochester Americans	AHL	51	13	19	32	32	3	0	0	0	4
2011–12	Buffalo Sabres	NHL	2	0	0	0	0	—	—	—	—	—
2012–13	Iserlohn Roosters	DEL	45	9	12	21	35	—	—	—	—	—
2013–14	Utica Comets	AHL	54	17	8	25	38	—	—	—	—	—
2014–15	Malmö Redhawks	Allsv	31	5	4	9	10	—	—	—	—	—
2014–15	Providence Bruins	AHL	44	17	9	26	22	5	1	2	3	4
AHL totals			572	131	124	255	416	62	9	14	23	50
NHL totals			56	8	5	13	26	—	—	—	—	—

=== International ===
Year	Team	Event	Result	GP	G	A	Pts	PIM
2009	United States	WC	4th	4	0	0	0	4
Senior totals				4	0	0	0	4

== Awards and honors ==
Award	Year
AHL
Calder Cup (Chicago Wolves)	2008
