= Prevention of concussions =

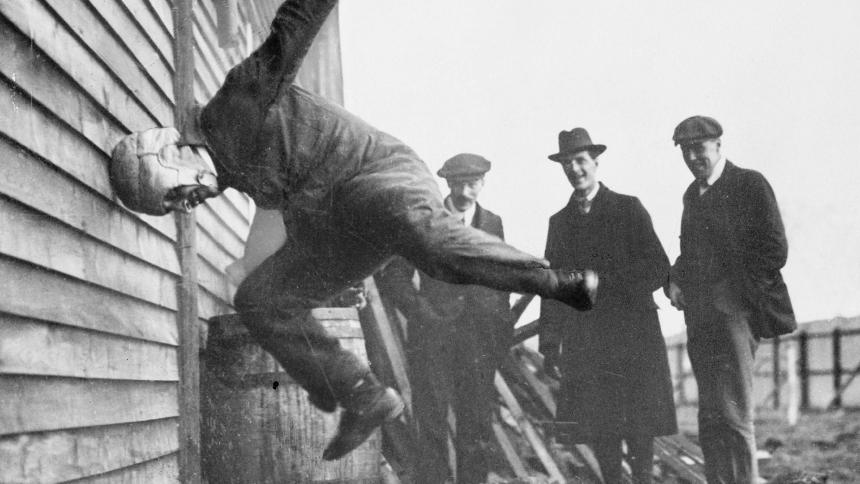
Demonstration in 1912 of the Warren Safety Helmet, which was designed to protect pilots but has often been wrongly thought to be a football helmet.

Prevention of mild traumatic brain injury involves taking general measures to prevent traumatic brain injury, such as wearing seat belts, using airbags in cars, securing heavy furnitures and objects before earthquake or covering and holding under the table during an earthquake. Older people are encouraged to try to prevent falls, for example by keeping floors free of clutter and wearing thin, flat, shoes with hard soles that do not interfere with balance.

Unfortunately, to date, there is no data to support the claim that any particular type of helmet or protective equipment reduces the risk of sports-related concussion. Improvements in the design of protective athletic gear such as helmets may decrease the number and severity of such injuries. New "Head Impact Telemetry System" technology is being placed in helmets to study injury mechanisms and potentially help reduce the risk of concussions among American Football players. Changes to the rules or the practices of enforcing existing rules in sports, such as those against "head-down tackling", or "spearing", which is associated with a high injury rate, may also prevent concussions.

== In sports ==
Prevention of undiagnosed and repeat injury is of importance in sports-related concussions. Every three minutes, a child in the United States is treated for a sports-related concussion. Between 2010 and 2014, sports-related concussions experienced a 500% uptick. Rapid sideline testing using short neuropsychological tests that assess attention and memory function have been proven useful and accurate. The Maddocks questions and the Standardized Assessment of Concussion (SAC) are examples of validated sideline evaluation tools. The Return To Play (RTP) protocol aims to decrease repeat concussions within a short time frame to minimize second impact syndrome. It assures players who experience a concussion have complete cognitive and clinical recovery before returning to play. Best practices of RTP involve graduated activity intensification with each step taking at least 24 hours to assure full rehabilitation within one week (includes asymptomatic at rest and during exercise). In cases in which resources (i.e. neuropsychologists, neuroimaging) are available on-site, RTP may be more rapid. Baseline assessments, performed before concussion occurs, provide a comparison from which to measure severity of post-concussive symptoms. However, they have not been shown to decrease risk of injury. The U.S. based nonprofit National Safety Council included state-by-state concussion prevention efforts for youth-sports related concussions in its 2017 State of Safety report.

Unfortunately, to date, there is no data to support the claim that any particular type of helmet or protective equipment reduces the risk of sports-related concussion. Improvements in the design of protective athletic gear such as helmets may decrease the number and severity of such injuries. New "Head Impact Telemetry System" technology is being placed in helmets to study injury mechanisms and potentially help reduce the risk of concussions among American Football players. Wearing a helmet is associated with a decreased risk of head injury for skiers and snowboarders.

Because of the lack of data to support the use of specially constructed helmets, some companies are creating in-built helmet sensors and software for brain injury prevention. The Swiss National Ice Hockey League is testing out systems that combine helmet-integrated sensors and analysis software to reveal a player's ongoing brain injury risk during a game. The company building the technology was spun out of the Swiss Federal Institute of Technology in Lausanne, Switzerland.

Changes to the rules or the practices of enforcing existing rules in sports, such as those against "head-down tackling", or "spearing", which is associated with a high injury rate, may also prevent concussions. The National Football League (NFL) implemented the sideline concussion assessment protocol in 2011 which oversees the treatment of any possible concussions and ensures that the medical staff on each sideline are following proper league protocol and testing for any head trauma. In 2011 the NFL enforced a kickoff rule change which moved football kickoffs five yards forward, resulting in reduced concussion incidence by 50%. Rules aimed at promoting fair play, while minimizing outwardly aggressive behavior, should be encouraged in all sports.

Wikiversity is calling for essays on Concussions in Sports
