= American Physical Therapy Association =

American professional organization

- Formation: 1921
- Type: Professional association
- Headquarters: Alexandria, Virginia, US
- Location: United States
- Members: >100,000 (as of 2023)
- Official language: English
- President: Kyle Covington
- Key people: CEO: Justin Moore
- Staff: 180
- Website: https://www.apta.org/

The American Physical Therapy Association (APTA) is an American individual membership professional organization representing more than 100,000 member physical therapists, physical therapist assistants, and students of physical therapy. The nonprofit association, based in Alexandria, Virginia, seeks to improve the health and quality of life of individuals in society by advancing physical therapist practice, education, and research, and by increasing the awareness and understanding of physical therapy's role in the nation's health care system. APTA has chapters in most U.S. states as well as academies/sections covering special interests.

APTA annually holds two large conferences and publishes the Physical Therapy & Rehabilitation Journal, the leading international journal for research in physical therapy and related fields,

APTA originally formed in 1921 as the American Women's Physical Therapeutic Association. The association was first led by President Mary McMillan, and an executive committee of elected officers governed the Association, which included 274 charter members. In 1922, the association changed its name to the American Physiotherapy Association. In 1923 the first two men were admitted into the American Physiotherapy Association. Membership grew to just under 1,000 in the late 1930s.

With the advent of World War II and a nationwide polio epidemic during the 1940s and 1950s, physical therapists were in greater demand. The Association's membership swelled to 8,000, and the number of physical therapy education programs across the U.S. increased from 16 to 39.

== Combined Sections Meeting ==
In 1976, the association launched an annual Combined Sections Meeting, informally known as "CSM," that is attended by physical therapists from around the United States. The name was selected because all of the sections of APTA meet at this time.

== See also ==
- Chartered Society of Physiotherapy (United Kingdom)
- Journal of Neurologic Physical Therapy
- Journal of Orthopaedic & Sports Physical Therapy
- Journal of Physiotherapy
- Physical Therapy & Rehabilitation Journal
