= Mike Stuart =

American ice hockey player

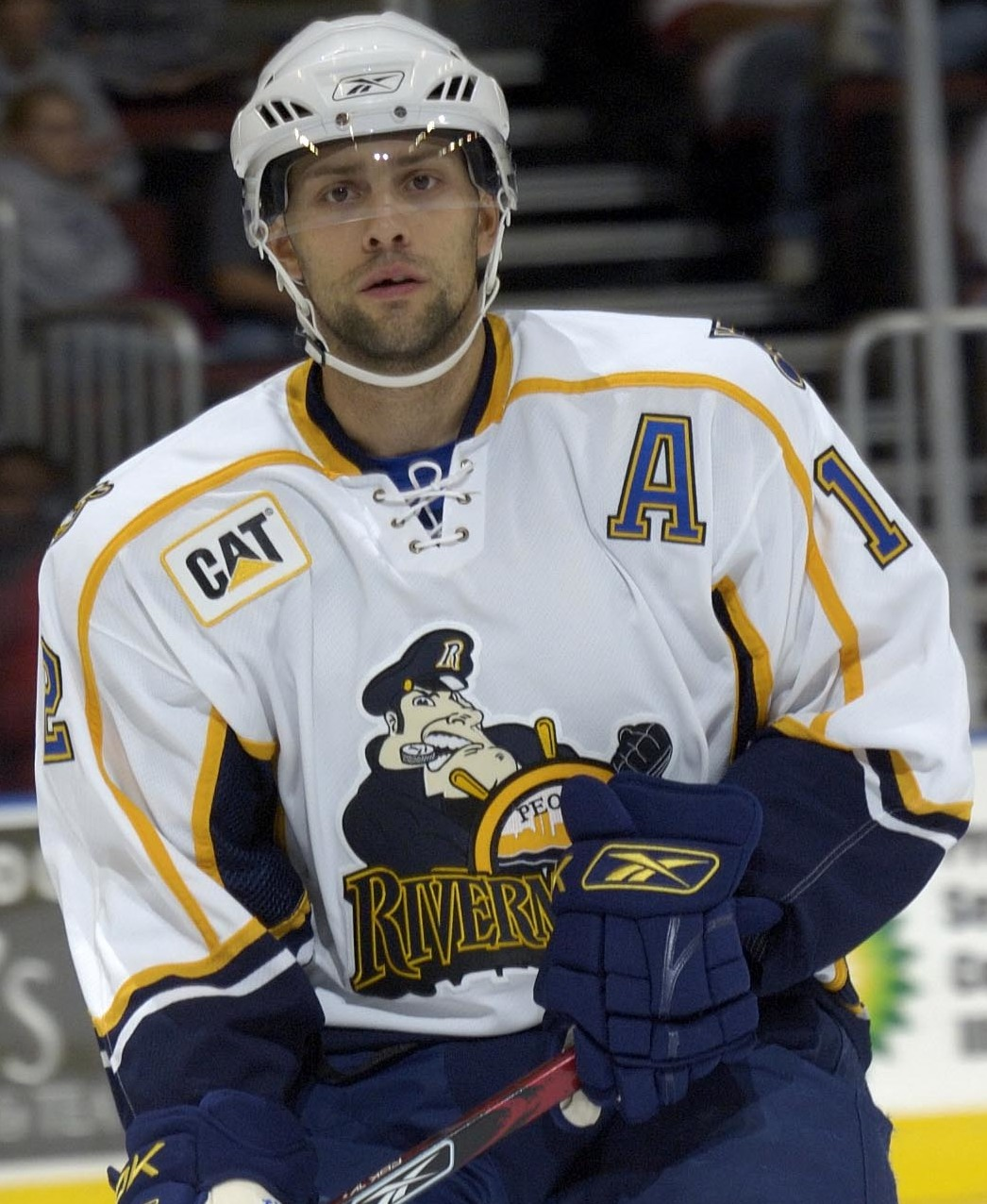
- Stuart with the Peoria Rivermen in 2006
- Born: August 31, 1980 (age 45) Rochester, Minnesota, U.S.
- Height: 6 ft 0 in (183 cm)
- Weight: 200 lb (91 kg; 14 st 4 lb)
- Position: Defense
- Shot: Right
- GET team Former teams: Lørenskog; Idaho Steelheads; Graz 99ers St. Louis Blues
- National team: United States
- NHL draft: 137th overall, 2000; Nashville Predators
- Playing career: 2002–2010

Michael B. Stuart (born August 31, 1980) is an American former professional ice hockey player who last played for Lørenskog of the Norwegian Eliteserien. He is the brother of Mark Stuart and Colin Stuart, and is the son of Mayo Clinic physician Michael Stuart.

== Playing career ==
He was drafted by the Nashville Predators in 5th round, 137th overall in the 2000 NHL entry draft and played 3 games for the St. Louis Blues.

== Career statistics ==
=== Regular season and playoffs ===
			Regular season					Playoffs
Season	Team	League	GP	G	A	Pts	PIM	GP	G	A	Pts	PIM
1996–97	Rochester Mustangs	USHL	46	4	9	13	22	—	—	—	—	—
1997–98	Rochester Mustangs	USHL	50	4	15	19	77	—	—	—	—	—
1998–99	Colorado College	WCHA	40	2	12	14	44	—	—	—	—	—
1999–2000	Colorado College	WCHA	32	2	5	7	26	—	—	—	—	—
2000–01	Colorado College	WCHA	33	1	13	14	36	—	—	—	—	—
2001–02	Colorado College	WCHA	35	3	9	12	46	—	—	—	—	—
2002–03	Peoria Rivermen	ECHL	19	2	7	9	12	—	—	—	—	—
2002–03	Worcester IceCats	AHL	41	1	5	6	19	3	0	0	0	2
2003–04	Worcester IceCats	AHL	30	0	4	4	20	—	—	—	—	—
2003–04	St. Louis Blues	NHL	2	0	0	0	0	—	—	—	—	—
2004–05	Worcester IceCats	AHL	70	1	10	11	26	—	—	—	—	—
2005–06	Peoria Rivermen	AHL	56	0	13	13	30	4	0	2	2	0
2005–06	Alaska Aces	ECHL	2	0	0	0	2	—	—	—	—	—
2005–06	St. Louis Blues	NHL	1	0	0	0	0	—	—	—	—	—
2006–07	Peoria Rivermen	AHL	63	0	9	9	56	—	—	—	—	—
2007–08	Graz 99ers	AUT	42	4	11	15	82	—	—	—	—	—
2008–09	Graz 99ers	AUT	50	8	12	20	62	—	—	—	—	—
2009–10	Idaho Steelheads	ECHL	21	3	8	11	17	—	—	—	—	—
2009–10	Lørenskog IK	NOR	20	2	4	6	36	2	0	2	2	2
AHL totals			260	2	41	43	151	7	0	2	2	2
NHL totals			3	0	0	0	0	—	—	—	—	—

=== International ===
Year	Team	Event	GP	G	A	Pts	PIM
2000	United States	WJC	7	0	0	0	2
Junior totals			7	0	0	0	2
