= Journal of Orthopaedic & Sports Physical Therapy =

- Discipline: Orthopaedics, physical therapy
- Language: English
- Edited by: Clare L. Ardern

Publication details
- Former names: Bulletin of the Orthopaedic Section; Bulletin of the Sports Medicine Section
- History: 1979–present
- Publisher: Journal of Orthopaedic & Sports Physical Therapy, Inc. (United States)
- Frequency: Monthly
- Open access: Delayed, after 3 years; also hybrid open access policy
- Impact factor: 6.276 (2021)

Standard abbreviations
- ISO 4: J. Orthop. Sports Phys. Ther.

Indexing
- ISSN: 0190-6011 (print); 1938-1344 (web)
- OCLC no.: 612563640

Links
- Journal homepage; Online access; Online archive

The Journal of Orthopaedic & Sports Physical Therapy is a peer-reviewed medical journal covering research about musculoskeletal rehabilitation, orthopaedics, physical therapy, and sports medicine. It was established in 1979, following the founding of the Orthopedic and Sports Medicine sections of the American Physical Therapy Association and resulted from a merger of the Bulletin of the Orthopaedic Section and the Bulletin of the Sports Medicine Section.

Initially published quarterly, the journal is now monthly. It is abstracted and indexed by PubMed/MEDLINE and CINAHL.
