= Stuart (name) =

Given name and surname

- Pronunciation: /ˈst(j)uərt/
- Gender: Male

Origin
- Languages: French; Scottish; English

Other names
- Related names: Stu, Stew, Stewie

Stuart is a French, Scottish, and English surname which was also adopted as a given name, traditionally for men. It is the French form of the Scottish surname Stewart. The French form of the name was brought to Scotland from France by Mary Stuart, in the 16th century.

The surname Stewart is an occupational name for the administrative official of an estate. The name is derived from the Middle English stiward, and Old English stigweard, stiweard. The Old English word is composed of the elements stig, meaning 'house(hold)'; and weard, meaning 'guardian'.

In England prior to the Norman Conquest, a steward was an officer who controlled the domestic affairs of a household, especially of a royal household. After the Conquest, the term was used as an equivalent of Seneschal, a steward of a manor or estate.

A variant form of the given name is Stewart. Pet forms of the given name are Stu, Stew and Stewie.

== Surname ==
- Alexander Hugh Holmes Stuart (1807–1891), American politician
- Alexander Moody Stuart (1809–1898), minister of the Free Church of Scotland (1843–1900)
- Andrea Stuart (born 1962), Barbadian-British writer
- Angus Stuart (1858–1923), British rugby union player
- Barbara Stuart (1930–2011), American actress
- Barbara H. Stuart, Australian chemist
- Bob Stuart (1920–2005), New Zealand international rugby union player, captain and coach
- Brad Stuart (born 1979), Canadian hockey player
- Catherine Maxwell Stuart, 21st Lady of Traquair (born 1964), Scottish landowner and businesswoman
- Chad Stuart (1941–2020), stage name of David Stuart Chadwick, English folk-pop singer and guitarist, one half of the duo Chad & Jeremy
- Charles Stuart (disambiguation), several people
- Cissy Stuart (1914–1989), American newspaper owner and crime victim
- Christina Doreothea Stuart, Norwegian artist
- Colin Stuart (disambiguation), several people
- David Stuart (disambiguation), several people
- Dick Stuart, a/k/a "Dr. Strangeglove" (1932–2002), American Major League Baseball player
- Douglas Stuart (writer) (born 1976), Scottish-American writer
- Francis Stuart (1902–2000), Irish writer and Saoi of Aosdána
- Giacomo Rossi Stuart (1925–1994), Italian actor
- Gilbert Stuart (1755–1828), American painter
- Gisela Stuart (born 1955), German-born British politician
- Gloria Stuart (1910–2010), American actress
- Harry Carter Stuart (1893–1963), American politician from Virginia
- Herbert Akroyd Stuart (1864–1927), English engineer
- Ian Stuart (disambiguation), several people
- Imogen Stuart, (1927–2024), sculptor and member of Aosdána
- J. E. B. Stuart (1833–1864), Confederate general in the American Civil War
- James "Athenian" Stuart (1713–1788), English archaeologist, architect and artist
- Jamie Stuart (born 1976), English footballer
- Jeb Stuart (writer) (born 1956), American writer and director
- Jesse Stuart (1906–1984), American writer
- Jill Stuart (born 1965), American fashion designer
- John Stuart (disambiguation), several people
- Katie Stuart (disambiguation), several people
- Kim Rossi Stuart (born 1969), Italian actor
- Mark Stuart (disambiguation), several people
- Marty Stuart (born 1958), musician, singer, songwriter, country music historian
- Mary Stuart (disambiguation), several people
- Maurine Stuart (1922–1990), Zen teacher
- Max Stuart (c.1932–2014), Indigenous Australian convicted of murder in 1959
- Michael Stuart (disambiguation), several people
- Moira Stuart (born 1949), British presenter and broadcaster
- Nick Stuart (1904–1973), Austro-Hungarian-born American actor and bandleader
- Nik Stuart (1927–2002), British Olympic gymnast
- Otho Stuart (1863–1930), British actor
- Peter Stuart, American songwriter and musician
- Peter Maxwell Stuart (1922–1990), Scottish nobleman
- Phil Stuart, Irish Gaelic footballer
- Richard Stuart (born 1964), American politician
- Ricky Stuart (born 1967), Australian rugby league player and coach
- Tyler Stuart (born 1999), American baseball player

== Given name ==
- Stuart Adamson (1958–2001), English-born Scottish guitarist, vocalist, and songwriter, co-founder and frontman of the rock band Big Country
- Stuart Ashen (born 1976), English comedian, animator, actor and author
- Stuart R. Bell (born 1957), American academic, President of the University of Alabama
- Stuart Alexander Bennett (born 1980), English professional wrestler under the ring name Wade Barrett
- Stuart Bingham (born 1976), English professional snooker player, 2015 World Champion
- Stuart Broad (born 1986), English cricketer
- Stuart Cable (1970–2010), British drummer
- Stuart Chatwood (born 1969), English-born Canadian rock musician
- Stuart Clark (born 1975), Australian cricketer
- Stuart Comberbach (1952–2025), Zimbabwean diplomat and politician
- Stu Cook (born 1945), American musician, original bassist of Creedence Clearwater Revival
- Stuart Davis (painter) (1892–1964), American painter
- Stuart Douglas (born 1978), English footballer
- Stu Douglass (born 1990), American-Israeli basketball player
- Stuart Fairchild (born 1996), Taiwanese-American baseball player
- Stuart Feldman, UNIX pioneer, creator of Make software
- Stuart Fraser (disambiguation), several people
- Stu Gardner, American musician and composer
- Stuart Garner (born 1968), British businessman
- Stuart Goddard (born 1956), English musician and actor known as Adam Ant
- Stuart Gray (disambiguation), several people
- Stuart Green (born 1981), English footballer
- Stuart Hall (cultural theorist) (1932–2014), Jamaican-born British sociologist and political activist
- Stuart "Captain Calamity" Hill (born 1943), English pensioner
- Stuart Kornfeld (1936–2025), American hematologist and glycobiologist
- Stuart Krohn (born 1962), American professional rugby union player
- Stu Laird (born 1960), Canadian Football League player
- Stuart MacGill (born 1971), Australian cricketer
- Stuart Maconie (born 1961), English radio DJ
- Stuart McDonald (cartoonist) (1931–2021), American editorial cartoonist and politician
- Stuart Mitchell (disambiguation), several people
- Stuart Morris, Australian lawyer and former justice of the Supreme Court of Victoria
- Stuart Nisbet (1934–2016), American character actor
- Stuart Parnaby (born 1982), English footballer
- Stuart Pearce (born 1962), English footballer and manager
- Stu Pederson (born 1960), Major League baseball player
- Stuart Rendell (born 1972), Australian hammer thrower
- Stuart Richardson (born 1973), bassist for Lostprophets
- Stuart Scott (1965–2015), American sportscaster
- Stuart Sternberg (born 1959), American owner of the Tampa Bay Rays
- Stuart Subotnick (born 1942), American businessman and media magnate
- Stuart Sutcliffe (1940–1962), British artist and original bassist of The Beatles
- Stuart Thurgood (born 1981), English footballer
- Stuart Townsend (born 1972), Irish actor and director
- Stuart Varney (born 1948), British-American political commentator
- Stuart Wells (born 1982), English actor
- Stuart Wheeler (1935–2020), American businessman and politician
- Stuart Wright (disambiguation), several people
- Stuart Zender (born 1974), original bass player from Jamiroquai

== Fictional characters ==
- Stuart "2-D" Pot, vocalist and pianist of the virtual band Gorillaz
- Stuart Bloom, comic store owner in The Big Bang Theory
- Stuart Bondek, Deputy Mayor in the sitcom Spin City
- Stuart Caley, a character in the 1998 American science-fiction disaster movie Deep Impact
- Stuart Chandler, a character on All My Children played by David Canary
- Stuart Little, the main character of the E. B. White novel of the same name later turned into three films
- Stu Macher, a main character in the original Scream franchise.
- Stuart McCormick, the father of Kenny McCormick from South Park
- Stu Pickles, a recurring character in the Rugrats media and the father of Tommy Pickles
- Stu Price, recurring character from The Hangover series
- Stu Redman, one of the main characters from Stephen King's The Stand
- Stuart Smalley, a recurring character played by Al Franken on the sketch comedy show Saturday Night Live
- Stuart, a minion from the Despicable Me franchise
- Stuart, Princess Caroline's assistant in Netflix original series BoJack Horseman
- King Charles II/Charles Stuart, one of the main characters from the television series The Diary of Samuel Pepys, portrayed by Douglas Wilmer
- Disco Stu, a recurring character in The Simpsons
- Percy Stuart, the protagonist of the German TV series (1969–1972) of the same name
- Stuart, Peter Sam's original name in The Railway Series and Thomas & Friends.

== See also ==
- House of Stuart, former royal house of Scotland, then the United Kingdom
- Stu
- Stuart (disambiguation)
- Stewart (disambiguation)
- Stewart (name), people with the surname and given name
- Stuart House (disambiguation)
