= Stewie =

Stewie may refer to:

== Nickname ==
- Stewie Dempster (1903–1974), former New Zealand cricketer and coach
- Stewart Elliott (born 1965), Canadian-born American thoroughbred jockey
- Stewart McSweyn (born 1995), Australian long-distance runner
- Stewart Stewie Speer (1928–1986), Australian jazz drummer
- Breanna Stewart (born 1994), American basketball player
- Homer Joseph Stewart (1915–2007) American aeronautical engineer, rocket propulsion expert and Caltech professor
- Stewart Williamson (1926–2008), English footballer

== Fictional characters ==
- Stewie Griffin, in the American animated TV series Family Guy
- Stewie the Duck, the titular character in the eponymous children's book series and app created by Kim and Stew Leonard Jr.
- Stewie Jr., in the Canadian animated television series RoboRoach

== Other uses ==
- Stewie (cat) (c. 2005–2013), once the world's longest domestic cat

== See also ==
- Stew (disambiguation)
- Stewart (disambiguation)
- Stu (disambiguation)
- Stuart (disambiguation)
