= David Stewart =

David Stewart may refer to:

== Public servants ==
=== Great Britain ===
- David Stewart, Earl of Strathearn (1357–c. 1386), Scottish magnate
- David Stewart, Duke of Rothesay (1378–1402), heir to the throne of Scotland
- David Stewart (bishop) (died 1476), Bishop of Moray
- David Stewart, Earl of Moray (c. 1455–1457), son of King James II of Scotland
- David Stewart (RAF officer) (1890–1924), World War I flying ace
- David Stewart of Banchory (1835-1919) Provost of Aberdeen and chairman of the Great North of Scotland Railway
- David Stewart (Scottish politician) (born 1956), Scottish politician

=== United States ===
- David Stewart (Maryland politician) (1800–1858), U.S. senator from Maryland
- David W. Stewart (1887–1974), U.S. senator from Iowa

=== Canada ===
- J. David Stewart (1910–1988), businessperson and political figure in Prince Edward Island
- David A. Stewart (politician) (1874–1947), Canadian politician

== Musicians ==
- Dave Stewart (Eurythmics) or David A. Stewart (born 1952), English musician, songwriter and record producer
- Dave Stewart (musician, born 1950), English keyboardist and composer
- David Stewart ("Dynamite" producer), British songwriter, record producer, and musician
- Dave Stewart (trombonist), British freelance bass trombonist

== Sportspeople ==
- David Stewart (footballer, born 1869) (1869–1933), Scottish footballer with Queen's Park, Scotland
- Heta Stewart (1869–1909), New Zealand Māori rugby union player, also known as David Stewart
- Dick Stewart (rugby union) (1871–1931), New Zealand rugby union player, also known as David Stewart
- David Stewart (cricketer, born 1924) (1924–2006), Scottish cricketer
- Dave Stewart (rugby union) (1935–2022), South African rugby union player
- David Stewart (footballer, born 1947) (1947–2018), Scotland international goalkeeper
- David Stewart (cricketer, born 1948), Scottish cricketer
- Dave Stewart (baseball) (born 1957), former pitcher in Major League Baseball and 1989 World Series MVP
- Dave Stewart (footballer, born 1958), Northern Irish footballer (Hull City, Scunthorpe United, Northern Ireland)
- Dave Stewart (Scottish footballer) (born 1978), Scottish footballer for Dumbarton
- David Stewart (American football) (born 1982), American football player
- Davie Stewart, Scottish footballer

== Other people ==
- David Stewart (major-general) (1772–1829), Scottish soldier and author
- David Stewart (master blender) (born 1945), longest serving master blender in the drinks industry, at William Grant & Sons, Scotland
- David Stewart (photographer) (born 1958), British photographer and director
- David J. Stewart (1915–1966), American Broadway, film, and television actor
- David K. Stewart (1937–1997), American special effects artist, Star Trek: The Motion Picture
- David O. Stewart (born 1951), American lawyer and author
- David R. Stewart, acquitted suspect in the strip-search prank call scam
- Dave Stewart (EastEnders), fictional character in EastEnders

== See also ==
- David Stuart (disambiguation)
