= Michael Stewart =

Michael Stewart may refer to: Candidate for Washington county Arkansas

== Entertainment and arts ==
- Michael Stewart (playwright) (1924–1987), American playwright and librettist
- Michael Stewart (musician) (1945–2002), American producer and member of We Five
- Michael Stewart (British writer, born 1945), British writer of the novel Monkey Shines
- Mike Stewart (novelist) (born 1955), American novelist
- Michael Stewart (graffiti artist) (1958–1983), American graffiti artist, victim of police brutality in New York City in 1980s
- Michael Stewart (British writer, born 1971), English writer and academic
- Michael Stewart (pyropainter) (born 1979), American surrealist artist
- Michael Stewart (music executive) (died 1999), American music executive
- Michael Stewart (1943–2007), American musician and record collector who performed as Backwards Sam Firk

== Sports ==
- Mike Stewart (basketball) (born 1950), American basketball player
- Mike Stewart (bodyboarder) (born 1963), American bodyboarder and surfer
- Michael Stewart (American football) (born 1965), American football safety
- Michael Stewart (ice hockey) (born 1972), Canadian-Austrian ice hockey coach and former player
- Michael Stewart (basketball) (born 1975), French basketball player in the NBA
- Michael Stewart (boxer) (born 1977), American boxer
- Michael Stewart (footballer) (born 1981), Scottish association football player
- Michael Stewart (golfer) (born 1990), Scottish golfer

== Other ==
- Michael Stewart, Baron Stewart of Fulham (1906–1990), British cabinet minister
- Michael Stewart (Jamaican politician), member of the Jamaican Parliament
- Michael Margaret Stewart (1952–2015), American lawyer
- Mike Stewart (politician) (born 1965), member of the Tennessee House of Representatives
- Mike Stewart (bishop) (born 1965), British-born Canadian Anglican bishop
- Sir Michael Shaw Stewart, 5th Baronet (1766–1825)
- Death of Michael Stewart, (1958-1983) aspiring artist and model who died in police custody
- Sir Michael Stewart (diplomat) (1911–1994), British diplomat

== See also ==
- Stewart (disambiguation)
- Michael Stuart (disambiguation)
- Michael Shaw-Stewart (disambiguation)
