= Stuart =

Stuart may refer to:

== People ==
- Stuart (name), a given name and surname (and list of people with the name)
- Clan Stuart of Bute, a Scottish clan
- House of Stuart, a royal house of Scotland and England

== Places ==
=== Australia ===
==== Generally ====
- Stuart Highway, connecting South Australia and the Northern Territory

==== Northern Territory ====
- Stuart, the former name for Alice Springs (changed 1933)
- Stuart Park, an inner city suburb of Darwin
- Central Mount Stuart, a mountain peak

==== Queensland ====
- Stuart, Queensland, a suburb of Townsville
- Mount Stuart, Queensland, a suburb of Townsville
- Mount Stuart (Queensland), a mountain

==== South Australia ====
- Stuart, South Australia, a locality in the Mid Murray Council
- Electoral district of Stuart, a state electoral district
- Hundred of Stuart, a cadastral unit

=== Canada ===
- Stuart Channel, a strait in the Gulf of Georgia region of British Columbia

=== United Kingdom ===
- Castle Stuart

=== United States ===
- Stuart, Florida
- Stuart, Iowa
- Stuart, Nebraska
- Stuart, Oklahoma
- Stuart, Virginia
- Stuart Township, Guthrie County, Iowa
- Stuart Township, Holt County, Nebraska
- Stuart School of Business, Illinois Institute of Technology
- Mount Stuart, Washington, a mountain in the Cascade Range
- J.M. Stuart Station, a coal-fired power plant in Adams County, Ohio

== Ships ==
- HMAS Stuart (D00), an Admiralty-type destroyer leader launched in 1918
- HMAS Stuart (DE 48), a River-class destroyer escort commissioned in 1963
- HMAS Stuart (FFH 153), an Anzac-class frigate commissioned in 2002

== Other uses ==
- Stuart (automobile), an early-1960s prototype electric vehicle
- Stuart period, a historical era in Britain coinciding with the rule of the Stuart dynasty
- Kerr, Stuart and Company, English railway locomotive manufacturer
- M3 Stuart tank, American World War II tank named after J. E. B. Stuart

== See also ==
- Sobieski Stuarts
- Stewart (disambiguation)
- Steuart (disambiguation)
- Stu
- Justice Stuart (disambiguation)
- Mount Stuart (disambiguation)
