= Steward =

Steward may refer to:

== Positions or roles ==
- Steward (office), a representative of a monarch
- Steward (Methodism), a leader in a congregation and/or district
- Communion steward, a position in the local church responsible for the distribution of the Eucharistic elements
- Steward, an official in horse, greyhound racing or car racing
- Steward, another term for majordomo
- Steward, an older term for a flight attendant
- A member of the Steward's Department of a ship, responsible for preparation of food or caring for living quarters
- Steward, United States Navy rate prior to 1975, now Culinary Specialist (US Navy)
- Union steward, a labor union official, also known as a shop steward
- Wine steward or sommelier
- Steward, a junior officer of a Masonic Lodge

== People ==
- Steward (surname)
- Steward (given name)

== Schools ==
- Steward School, a private school in Richmond, Virginia, United States
- Stewards Academy, a secondary school in Harlow, Essex, England

== Geography ==
- Steward, Illinois, United States, a village
- Steward Creek, a stream in Minnesota, United States
- Steward Island, Greenland

== Other uses ==
- 15371 Steward, an asteroid
- Steward or Stewart Aqueduct, Smethwick, West Midlands, England
- Steward Bank, a commercial bank in Zimbabwe
- Steward Health Care, an American healthcare network
- Steward Observatory, Department of Astronomy, University of Arizona
- Stewards (paramilitary organization), a former wing of the British Union of Fascists

== See also ==
- Godric the Steward (died c. 1114), English dapifer (steward) of the Earl of East Anglia
- Hamo the Steward, 11th century Anglo-Norman Sheriff of Kent
- Osbern the Steward, 11th century steward of two Dukes of Normandy
- Robert the Steward, another name for Robert II of Scotland (1316–1390), King of Scots
- Steward's Lodge, official residence of the taoiseach of Ireland
- Stewards of Gondor, rulers from J. R. R. Tolkien's legendarium of Middle-earth
- High Steward (disambiguation)
- Stewards' Cup (disambiguation)
- Stewardship
- Stewart (disambiguation)
- Stuart (disambiguation)
