= The Barn at Kings Highway =

- U.S. Historic district – Contributing property
- Location within Connecticut Location within the United States
- Location: 57 Kings Highway North
- Coordinates: 41°8′23″N 73°22′52″W
- Built: c. 1900
- Architect: Ann Sheffer
- Part of: Kings Highway North Historic District (ID98000884)
- Designated CP: August 10, 1998

The Barn at Kings Highway (informally known as The Barn) is a historic landmark in the town of Westport, Connecticut. It is located at 57 Kings Highway North on privately owned land. Opened in the early 1900s by Ann Sheffer and her family, The Barn has served as a meeting place and social hub for Westporters of all generations. It is a contributing property of the Kings Highway North Historic District which was listed on the National Register of Historic Places in 1998. Its early years featured its use as a place for luxurious parties thrown by the aristocrat members of Westport's population.

== History ==
=== Early history ===
In its early years, it featured its use as a place for luxurious parties thrown by the aristocrat members of Westport's population.

=== Serving as a speakeasy ===
During the Prohibition era, The Barn served as a speakeasy for broadway actresses and actors to use when they journeyed to the suburbs. As Prohibition winded down, so did the use of The Barn.

=== Disrepair ===
Because Prohibition winded down, its owners allowed it to fall into disrepair, and it was abandoned from 1933 to 2014.

== New Age ==
In the past few years, a grassroots movement led by Alfred Puchala, current owner of 57 Kings Highway North, has seen an outpouring of support from Westport residents in refurbishing the barn for current use. His efforts have led to clubs from the local high school (Staples High School) using The Barn as a meeting place, as well as its recognition by organizations such as Historic Barns of Connecticut. Recently, a group of seniors from Staples High School have become the de facto leaders of the barn. They have led the clean up of The Barn to return it to its former self. The group was recognized by Westport's mayor at Town Hall for their efforts to restore The Barn.

== See also ==
- National Register of Historic Places listings in Fairfield County, Connecticut
