= Mount Stewart (disambiguation) =

Mount Stewart is a 19th-century house and garden in Northern Ireland.

Mount Stewart may also refer to:

- Mount Stewart, Prince Edward Island, Canada, a municipality
- Mount Stewart (California), United States, a mountain in Sequoia National Park
- Mount Stewart, County Tyrone, a townland in County Tyrone, Northern Ireland
- Mount Stewart (townland), a townland in County Down, Northern Ireland
- Mount Charles Stewart, a mountain in the Canadian Rockies
- Mount Stewart (New Zealand), a mountain in Arthur's Pass National Park
- Mount Stewart (Alberta), a mountain in Alberta, Canada

== See also ==
- Mount Stuart (disambiguation)
- Stewart Peak (disambiguation)
