= Stewarts Creek Township, North Carolina =

Stewarts Creek Township, North Carolina may refer to one of the following townships:

- Stewarts Creek Township, Harnett County, North Carolina
- Stewarts Creek Township, Surry County, North Carolina

See also

- Stewart Township (disambiguation)
