= Tsitsi =

Tsitsi may refer to:

- Tsitsi Dangarembga (born 1959), Zimbabwean author
- Tsitsi Gezi, Zimbabwean politician
- Grace Tsitsi Mutandiro, Zimbabwean diplomat
- Dantes Tsitsi, Nauruan politician
- Edwin Tsitsi (1925–1997), Nauruan politician
