= Stewardship (disambiguation) =

Stewardship in the sense of caring management or leadership may refer to:

- Stewardship
- Stewardship (theology)

Specifically, it may refer to:

- Environmental stewardship
- Land stewardship
- Cultural heritage stewardship
- Nuclear stockpile stewardship
- Product stewardship
- Data stewardship
- Financial stewardship
- Antimicrobial stewardship

== See also ==
- Steward (disambiguation)
