= Colin Stewart =

Colin Stewart may refer to:

- Colin Stewart (diplomat) Canadian diplomat
- Colin Stewart (alpine skier) (1927–2015), American Olympic skier
- Colin Stewart (footballer) (born 1980), English-born Scottish goalkeeper
- Colin Stewart (record producer) (born 1974), record producer and audio engineer
- Colin Stewart (rugby union) (born 1980), Scottish rugby union player
- R. Colin Stewart (1926–1994), Canadian politician

== See also ==
- Colin Stuart (disambiguation)
