= Mark Stewart =

Mark Stewart may refer to:

- Mark MacTaggart-Stewart (1834–1923), Scottish politician
- Mark Stewart (baseball) (1889–1932), American baseball player
- Mark Stewart (rugby union) (1905-1993), Scottish rugby union player
- Mark Stewart (artist) (born 1951), watercolor artist
- Mark Stewart (American football) (born 1959), football player
- Mark Stewart (English musician) (1960–2023), founding member of The Pop Group
  - Mark Stewart (album)
- Stew (musician) (born 1961), singer/songwriter from Los Angeles
- Mark Stewart (American musician), New York City based multi-instrumentalist
- Mark Stewart (politician) (born 1979), Queensland MP
- Mark Stewart (footballer) (born 1988), Scottish footballer
- Mark Stewart (cyclist) (born 1995), Scottish track cyclist
- Mark Stewart (racing driver) (born 1997), American stock car racing driver

== See also ==
- Mark Stuart (disambiguation)
