= SOTU =

SOTU is an initialism that may represent:

== Places ==
- Sotu (Spanish: Soto), Les Regueres, Asturias, Spain; a parish

== Government ==
- State of the Union, annual address by the President of the United States before Congress
- Special Operations Task Unit
  - of the Estonian Special Operations Force
  - of the Portuguese Special Operations Troops Centre

== Music ==
- Sound of the Underground, a 2003 album by Girls Aloud
- Sounds of the Universe, a 2009 album by Depeche Mode
- SOTU, 2013 album by Sunnery James & Ryan Marciano

== Other uses ==
- State of the Union (TV program), a Sunday morning talk show on CNN
- The Scale of the Universe, an interactive online visualization tool

== See also ==
- STU (disambiguation)
- SOU (disambiguation)
- SU (disambiguation)
