= Somerset Park =

Football stadium in Ayr, Scotland

- San Somerset; Somerset
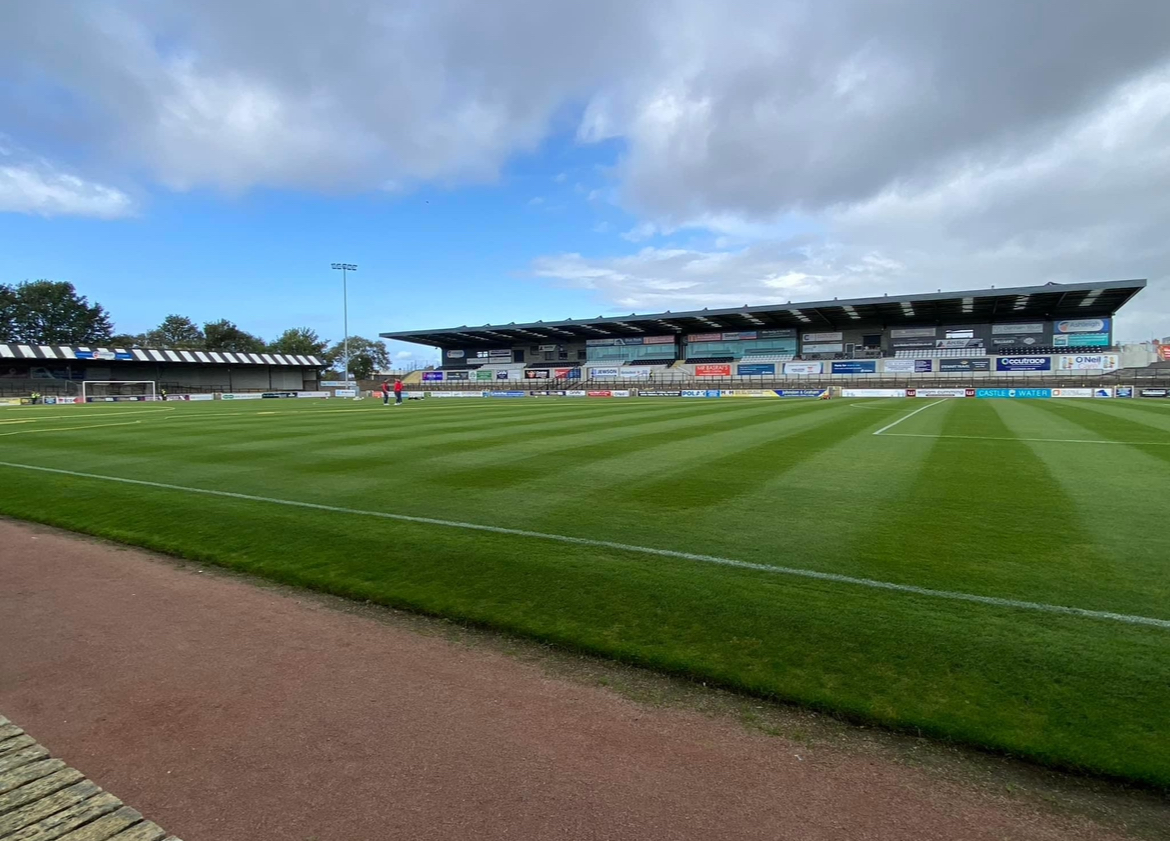
- Somerset Park, August 2024 with new North Stand

- Location in South Ayrshire
- Location: Ayr, Scotland
- Coordinates: 55°28′10″N 4°37′12″W
- Owner: Ayr United F.C. (1920–)
- Capacity: 10,185 (1,597 seated)
- Surface: Grass
- Field size: 110 yd × 72 yd (101 m × 66 m)

Construction
- Opened: 1888
- Architect: Archibald Leitch

Tenants
- Ayr F.C. (1888–1910); Ayr United F.C. (1910–)

Somerset Park is a football stadium located in Ayr, South Ayrshire, Scotland. It has been the home of Scottish Championship team Ayr United since the club was founded in 1910. Prior to that, it was the home ground of Ayr, who merged with Ayr Parkhouse to form Ayr United. The 10,185 capacity stadium was designed by renowned football stadium architect Archibald Leitch.

Somerset Park has hosted a number of international football fixtures, mostly Scotland national football team under–17s and under–19s matches. In 2001 it was the first stadium in Britain to host a UEFA Women's Cup match.

== History ==
=== Building Somerset ===
Ayr commissioned Somerset Park in 1888 to replace Beresford Park. Ayr needed an alternative venue for a friendly match against Aston Villa because Beresford Park was being used for the Ayr Cattle Show at the time. The Beresford Park clubhouse and grandstand were dismantled and reassembled at Somerset Park. Ayr entered the Scottish Football League in 1897, but failed to seriously challenge for promotion to the First Division. Ayr Parkhouse, who played at Beresford Park, subsequently joined the league, but were also stuck in the Second Division. The two clubs decided to merge in 1910 to form Ayr United and the new club adopted Somerset Park as its primary home, although Beresford Park was used during the First World War.

Ayr United bought Somerset Park for £2,500 in 1920. Four years later, the direction of the pitch was changed when the club built a new Main Stand. A roof was built in 1933 over the railway end terrace, which was split into male and female sections.

=== Record attendances ===
The ground's record attendance of 25,225 was set on 13 September 1969 in a match against Rangers. Floodlights were installed a year later. Somerset Park was relatively late in doing this because the ground is in the flight path of the nearby Prestwick Airport. The Somerset Road end terrace was covered in 1971. A new wing was added to the Main Stand in 1989, increasing the seating capacity to 1,450 in an overall capacity of 12,128.

=== 1990s and 2000s ===
During the 1990s and early 2000s, Ayr United were owned by Bill Barr, whose Barr Construction company built new stands for several clubs, including Kilmarnock, Hibernian, St Mirren, Stranraer and Airdrie. Despite this work on other Scottish grounds, Somerset Park was not developed, which meant that Ayr United could not be promoted to the Scottish Premier League. Barr had plans for an out-of-town stadium rejected by the Scottish Executive. He retired in 2004 and passed control of the club to Donald Cameron and his family.

Somerset Park was the first stadium in Britain to host the UEFA Women's Cup (now Champions League) in 2001. It staged the four-club group of Ayr United Ladies, the 2000–01 SWFL champions.

==== Plans to sell Somerset ====
In November 2006, Ayr United publicised plans to sell Somerset Park to housing developer Barratt Homes and move to a new purpose built stadium in the Heathfield area of Ayr. The new ground was planned to consist of a single stand of 3,650 seats, with the potential to add another 3,000-seat stand and a 1,000-capacity terrace, giving a total potential capacity of 7,650. South Ayrshire Council gave outline planning permission in January 2008. Barratt Homes pulled out of the deal to purchase Somerset Park in August 2008, however, with the developer claiming that the planning rules were "unworkable". The Great Recession, which depressed housing values, also affected the proposal's viability.

=== 2010s ===
The Main Stand roof was damaged by Hurricane Bawbag in December 2011, forcing Ayr United to postpone a First Division match against Ross County.

== Transport ==
Ayr railway station is approximately 20 minutes walk from Somerset Park. Newton-on-Ayr railway station is closer to the ground, but fewer trains stop there. The A77 road is the main route towards Ayr. To reach Somerset Park, take the A719 road (Whitletts Road) into town, passing Ayr Racecourse. There is a small car park next to Somerset Park and nearby street parking is also available.

== Stands and Terraces ==
=== Main Stand ===
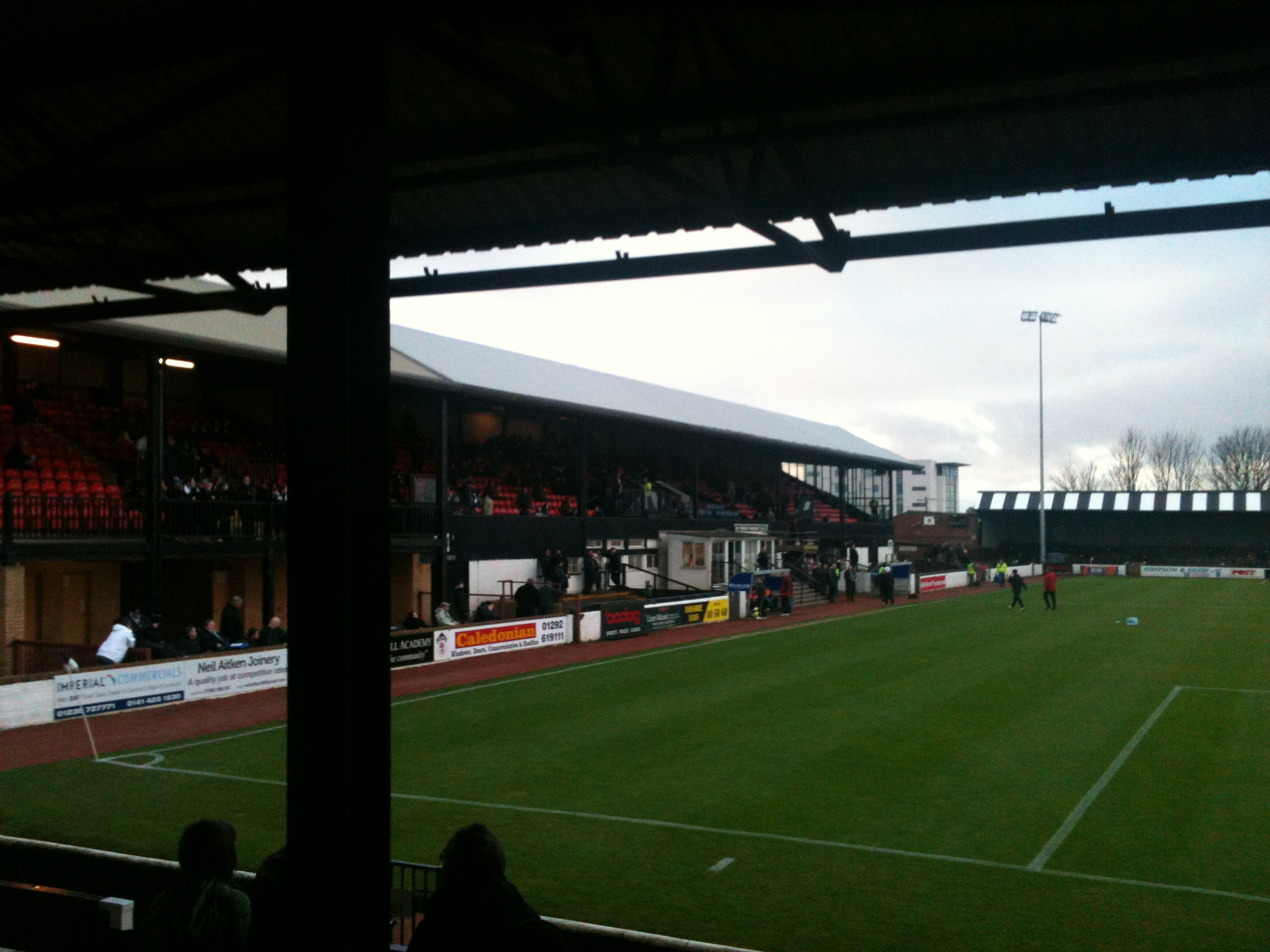
A view of the Main Stand and Family Stand from the Somerset Road End.

The current Main Stand was built in 1920 and designed by Glaswegian architect, Archibald Leitch, famous for his work designing Hampden Park, Stamford Bridge, White Hart Lane, Goodison Park, Ibrox Stadium, Selhurst Park, Tynecastle, Highbury Stadium and Craven Cottage, at the cost of £8,000. The capacity of the main stand following its construction was 2,592. In 1989, an extension to the main stand was added to contain an extra 600 seats and contains a disabled section. The current seating capacity of Somerset Park is 1,597. In late 2012, the club were once again forced into further work upon the Main Stand, removing the remaining concrete asbestos tiles on the roof and upgrading the kitchen facilities.

=== Somerset Road End ===
In 1971, Ayr United F.C. erected a roof to cover the Somerset Road End terrace at the cost £12,000. To celebrate the construction of the new roof, Ayr United invited English club Sunderland to play a friendly match - the result was a 1–1 draw. Following the storms of late 2011, the roof had to be totally rebuilt.

=== North Terrace ===
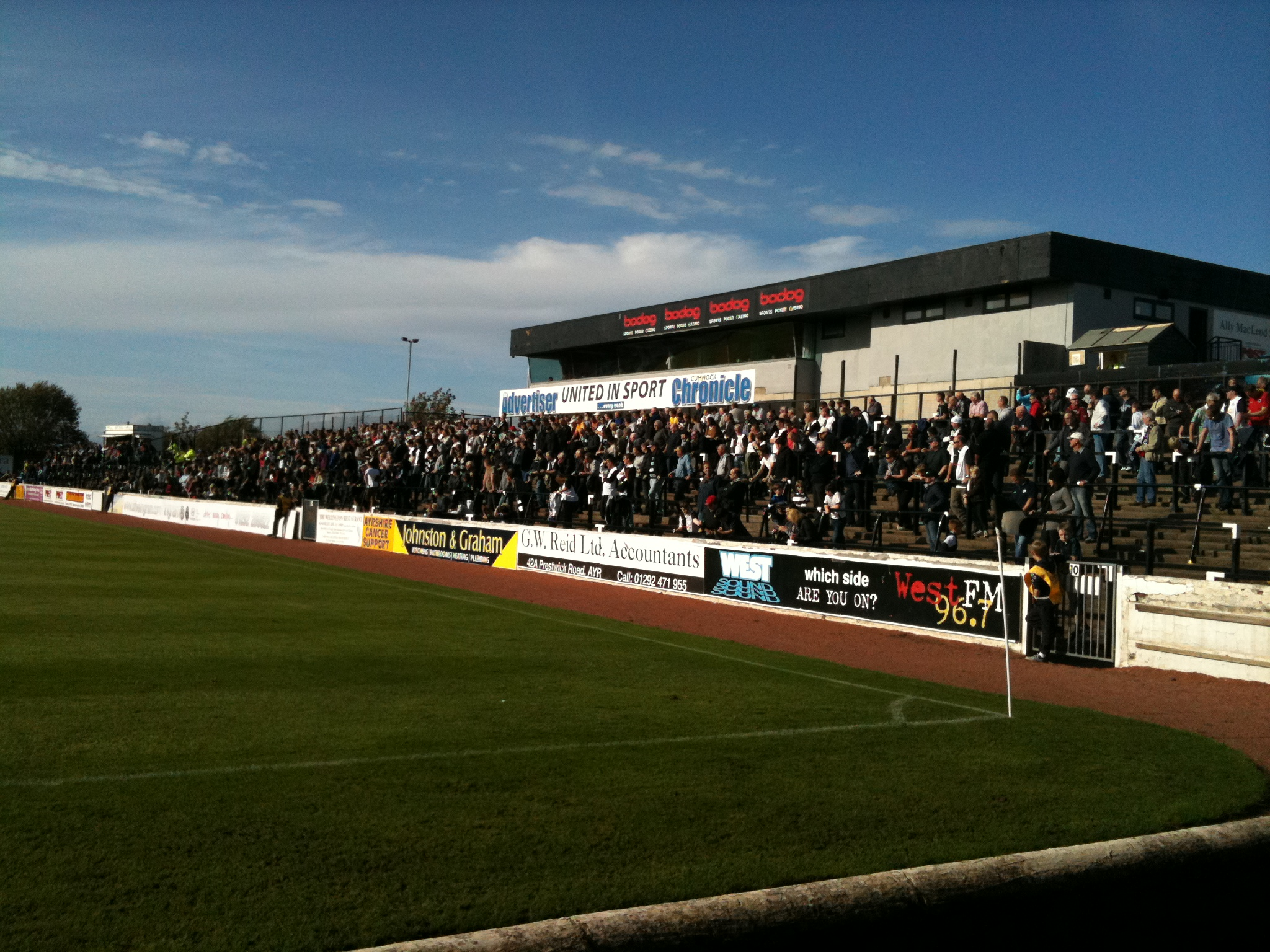
The North Terrace with the Ally MacLeod hospitality suite upon it in 2011.

The North Terrace was an open terrace, for both home and away supporters, with a segregation fence erected in 1980. A hospitality suite on the north terrace that opened in 1996 is currently named the "Ally MacLeod Hospitality Suite sponsored by the Ayrshire Post ", which replaced the traditional score board in its place. Each box is named after a club great from either the 1960s, 1970s or 1980s, they are: Quinton 'Cutty' Young, Stan Quinn, Henry Templeton, Davie Stewart and John 'Spud' Murphy.

In September 2022, plans for a new north stand (covering, upgrading and enlarging the existing north terrace rather than demolishing it) were approved by the local authority. The work was completed in 2024.

=== The Railway End ===
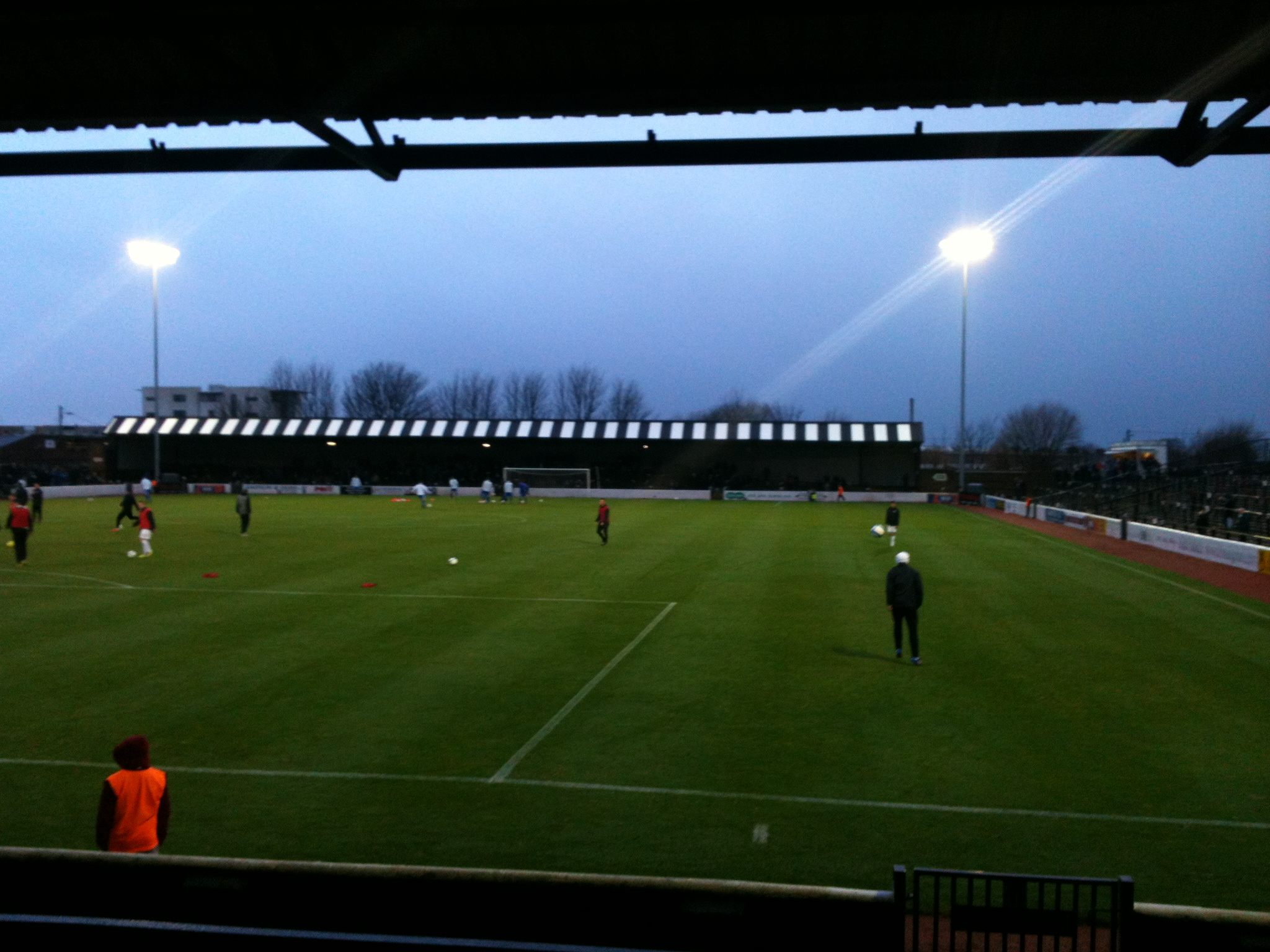
The Railway End in January 2013.

The Railway End which now houses primarily away supporters but also home supporters from time to time, is a covered terrace opened in September 1933, following a £230 donation from the supporters club and £120 from the ladies supporters club. In 2012, the club totally re-roofed the Railway End, despite not being instructed to at the time.

=== Floodlights ===
Somerset Park first had floodlights installed in 1970, when supporters raised £12,201:14s:11d towards the £18,000 that was required. The first floodlight game at Somerset Park was a Second XI match against Partick Thistle although they were not officially opened until 18 November 1970, when Ayr United beat Newcastle United 2–0 in a ceremonial match for the occasion. In 2011, the original lights had to be replaced, which caused a Challenge Cup match against Raith Rovers to be switched to Greenock Morton's Cappielow Park, Ayr United won 3–0.

=== Further Developments ===
Despite gaining planning permission, the club decided to abort the move to a new stadium in the Heathfield area of Ayr, so Ayr United remain at Somerset Park for the foreseeable future. In 2013, following the appointment of new director, Jim Kirkwood, whose company purchased the car park from the club in 2010, Kirkwood made proposals to the further development of Somerset Park, revealing that Somerset Park had seen little of the maintenance required in the last decade. Jim Kirkwood revealed that his plans are "not pie and sky, they are very deliverable".

Ayr United's impressive form at the outset of the 2018–19 Scottish Championship season led observers to examine the latest SPFL entry requirements due to the possibility of the club achieving promotion while still based at the unmodernised Somerset Park (all other promoted teams' stadia since the advent of the new league body in 2013 had met the previous SPL seating threshold of 6000, therefore little attention was paid to the matter). It was confirmed that the SPFL statutes only required grounds to have 'bronze standard' facilities (500 covered places), meaning Somerset would be accepted as a Premiership venue with minimal improvements.

== International matches ==
=== Under 17s ===
28 February 2012
19:00 (GMT+0)

Scotland	1 − 1	Serbia
	Report

Somerset Park, Ayr
Attendance: 445
Referee: John Beaton (Scotland)
20 March 2012
19:30 (GMT+0)

Scotland	1 − 0	Lithuania
Findlay 65'	Report

Somerset Park, Ayr
Referee: Johnny Casanova (San Marino)
22 March 2012
19:30 (GMT+0)

Denmark	3 − 1	Lithuania
Mathiasen 5'; Andersen 25'; Nielsen 26'	Report	Petravičius 73'

Somerset Park, Ayr
Referee: Johnny Casanova (San Marino)

=== Under 19s ===
19 March 2013
14:00 (GMT+0)

Scotland	3 − 2	Sweden
Lindelöf 57' (o.g.); Beck 63'; McKay 85'	Report	Davey 40' (o.g.); Söderström 47'

Somerset Park, Ayr
Attendance: 488
