= Katie Stewart =

Katie Stewart may refer to:

- Katie Stewart (writer) (1934–2013), British cookery writer
- Katie Stewart (politician), Colorado politician
- Katie Stewart (softball), American softball player

== See also ==
- Katie Stuart (disambiguation)
