= Michael Stuart =

Michael Stuart may refer to:

- Michael Stuart (singer) (born 1975), Puerto Rican-American salsa singer and actor
- Michael Stuart (physician), American sports physician and orthopedic surgeon
- Mike Stuart (born 1980), ice hockey player
- Michael-Joel David Stuart (born 1997), actor
- Michael B. Stuart (born 1967), member of the West Virginia State Senate, formerly United States Attorney for the Southern District of West Virginia

== See also ==
- Michael Stewart (disambiguation)
- Stuart (name)
