= Staples High School =

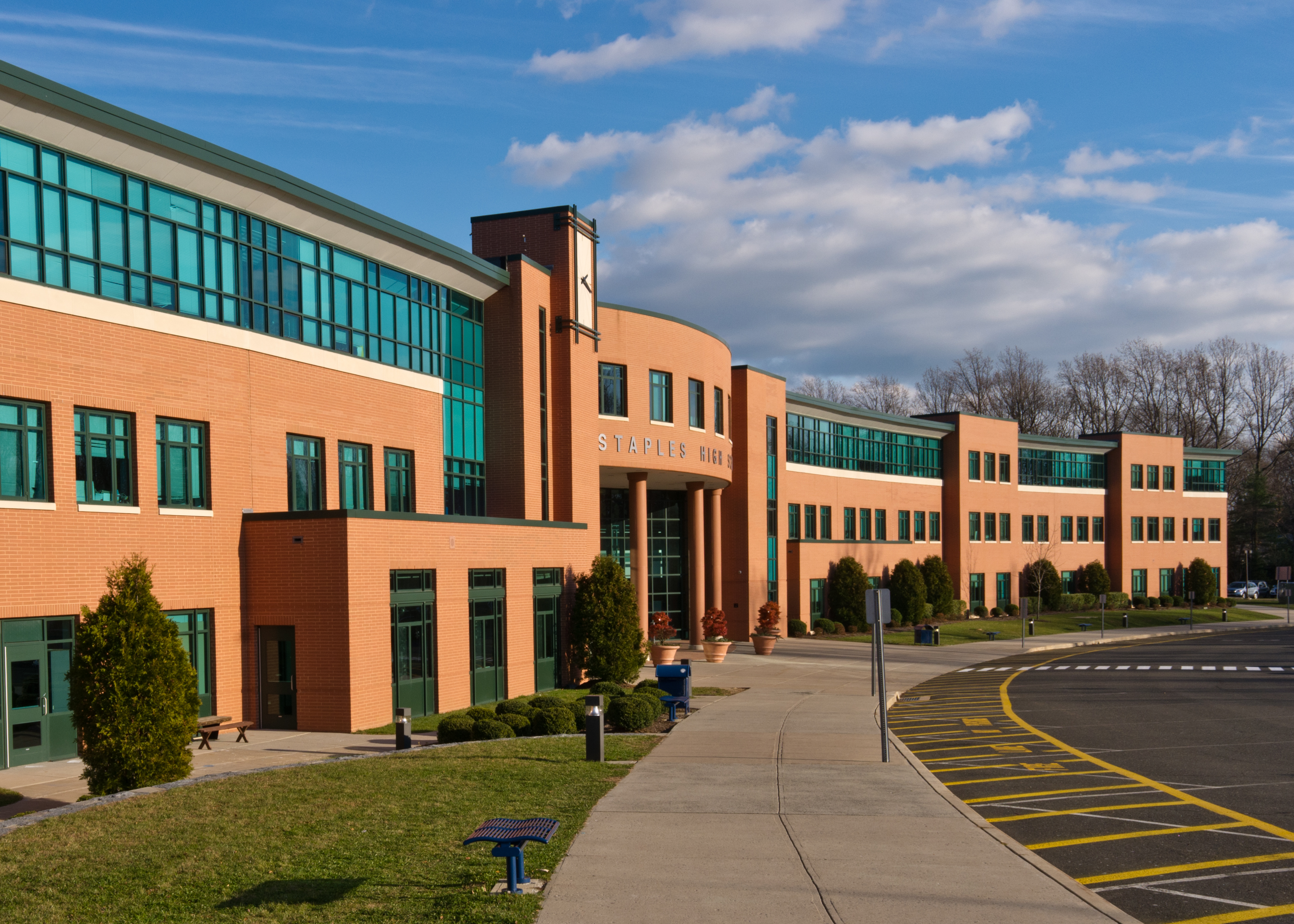
- Main building, December 2011

Location
- 70 North Avenue; Westport, Connecticut 06880; United States; 41°09′14″N 73°19′41″W

Information
- Type: Public high school
- Established: April 26, 1884 (142 years ago)
- School district: Westport Public Schools
- CEEB code: 070920
- Principal: Stafford Thomas Jr.
- Teaching staff: 152.90 (FTE)
- Grades: 9-12
- Enrollment: 1,626 (2023-2024)
- Student to teacher ratio: 10.63
- Colors: Navy blue and white
- Mascot: Construction worker named "the Wrecker"
- Nickname: Wreckers
- Publication: Soundings
- Newspaper: Inklings
- Yearbook: Stapleite
- Website: shs.westportps.org

Staples High School is a public high school in Westport, Connecticut, United States. It is named after Horace Staples, who founded the school on April 26, 1884. Westport is one of eight school districts in District Reference Group A (along with Darien, Easton, New Canaan, Redding, Ridgefield, Weston, and Wilton).

== Campus ==
The school was first located at Riverside Avenue in a three-level red brick building. In 1958 Staples High School moved to a 9-acre (3.6 ha) campus at 70 North Avenue. As of 2020, the neighborhood around the high school is known as the Staples census-designated place.

== History ==
Seeing the "town's lack of progress in education," Horace Staples, a businessman with interests in shipping, hardware sales, and banking, founded Staples High School. Initially Staples intended to fund the school via an interest left in his will; however, that interest became known while he was still alive, and led to the school's foundation being laid in 1884. On April 24, 1884, businesses closed early in Westport to celebrate the dedication of Staples High School. Connecticut Governor Thomas M. Waller attended the opening.

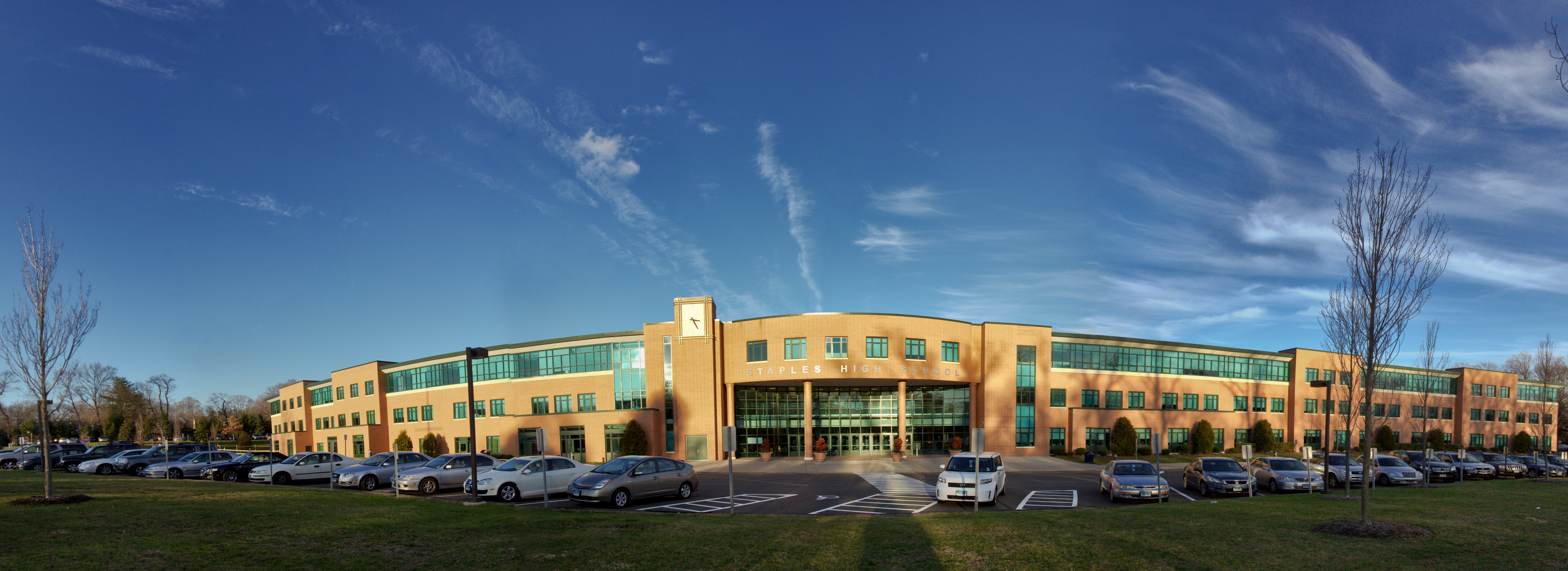
Front of Staples High School

In the first year of operation, commencing in the fall of 1884, Staples High School had 60 of the 807 students attending schools in Westport.

On June 24, 1887, Staples High School conferred its first high school diplomas to six female students who comprised its first graduating class.

In 1909, the town of Westport accepted control of Staples High School from the Horace Staples estate. From 1966 to 1969, Staples attracted some of the biggest names in music to perform in concert. The Animals, Cream, the Yardbirds, the Young Rascals, Sly and the Family Stone and Louis Armstrong to name a few. A short documentary was produced in 2017.

== Activities ==
=== Inklings ===
The school newspaper, Inklings, has won the Columbia Scholastic Press Association gold medal every year since 2000 (in addition to a silver medal in 1999). The paper has also received the rank of First Place with "Special Honors" from the American Scholastic Press Association since 2001 and has been dubbed "the best school paper in the state" by the Hartford Courant.

== Notable alumni ==
- Lynsey Addario, photojournalist
- Britt Baron, actress
- Ben Casparius, Major League Baseball pitcher
- Marilyn Briggs (1970), professionally known as Marilyn Chambers, model and adult film actress
- Kevin Conroy, actor
- John DiBartolomeo, American-Israeli basketball player for Maccabi Tel Aviv of the Israeli Basketball Premier League
- Cynthia Gibb, actress
- Luke Greenfield, director
- Will Haskell, Connecticut State Senator
- Win Headley, American football player
- Tyler Hicks, photojournalist
- Stew Leonard Jr., President and CEO of Stew Leonard's
- Paul Lieberstein, screenwriter, actor and producer
- Mariangela Lisanti, theoretical physicist
- Christopher Lloyd (1957), Emmy Award winning actor
- Pamela Sue Martin, actress
- Mike Noonan, soccer coach
- Justin Paul, of the team Pasek and Paul, is a Golden Globe and Academy Award-winning composer and lyricist.
- Harry Rodrigues, record producer
- Scott Froschauer, artist, sculptor, and key grip
- Jane Yolen, children's book author
