= Judge Stewart =

Judge Stewart may refer to:

- Carl E. Stewart (born 1950), judge of the United States Court of Appeals for the Fifth Circuit
- Charles E. Stewart Jr. (1916–1994), judge of the United States District Court for the Southern District of New York
- Donald Stewart (Alabama politician) (born 1940), magistrate judge of the United States District Court for the Northern District of Alabama
- Potter Stewart (1915–1985), judge of the United States Court of Appeals for the Sixth Circuit prior to his appointment to the Supreme Court of the United States
- Ted Stewart (born 1948), judge of the United States District Court for the District of Utah
- William Alvah Stewart (1903–1953), judge of the United States District Court for the Western District of Pennsylvania

== See also ==
- Justice Stewart (disambiguation)
