= Stew (disambiguation) =

A stew is a combination of food ingredients cooked in liquid.

Stew may also refer to:

== People ==
- Stew (musician), singer/songwriter/playwright and member of the band The Negro Problem
- Stewart Stew Albert (1939–2006), anti-Vietnam War activist and co-founder of the Yippies
- Stewart Stew Barber (born 1939), former American Football League player and executive
- Stewart Stew Bolen (1902-1969), American Major League Baseball pitcher
- Stewart Stew Bowers (1915-2005), American Major League Baseball pitcher
- Stewart Stew Cliburn (born 1956), American former Major League Baseball pitcher
- Stewart Stew Hofferth (1913-1994), American Major League Baseball catcher
- Stewart Stew Johnson (born 1944), former American Basketball Association player
- Stew Leonard, Jr., president and CEO of the Stew Leonard's American supermarket chain
- Stewart Stew Morrill (born 1952), American college basketball coach

== Other uses ==
- Stew, a 2020 play by Zora Howard
- Stew, a medieval term for a brothel
- Stew, another name for a rookery (slum)
- Stew Leonard's, a family-owned American retail chain that includes grocery stores and wineries
- Stew pond, or stew, a pond used for keeping live fish

== See also ==
- Stewart (disambiguation)
- Stu
