= Stuart Comberbach =

Zimbabwean diplomat and politician (1952–2025)

His Excellency Stuart Comberbach
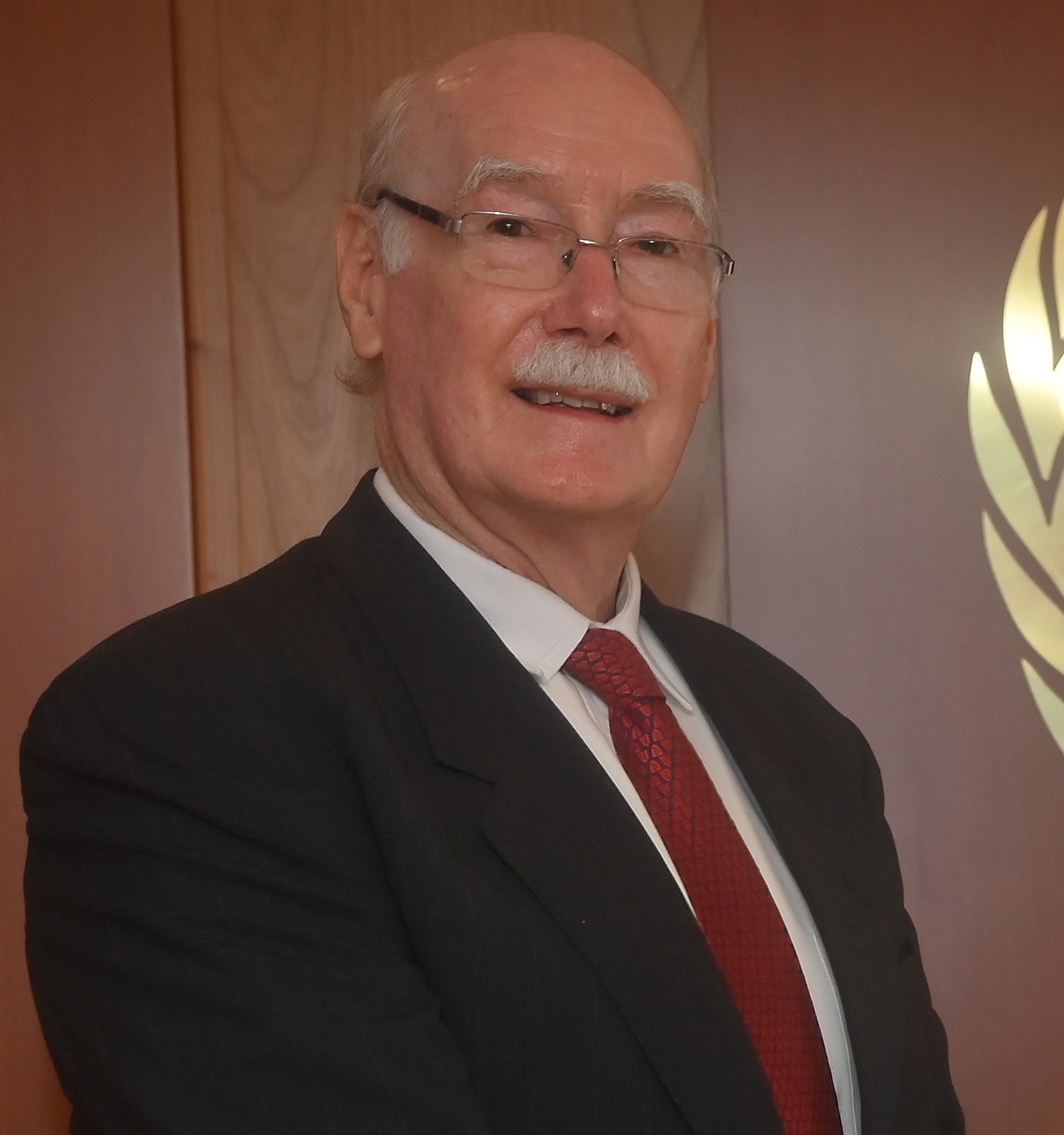

Permanent Representative of Zimbabwe to the United Nations and other international organisations in Geneva, Switzerland
- In office April 2021 – 4 September 2025
- President: Emmerson Mnangagwa

Special Advisor to the Minister of Foreign Affairs and International Trade of the Republic of Zimbabwe.
- In office September 2018 – April 2021
- President: Emmerson Mnangagwa
- Succeeded by: Grace Tsitsi Mutandiro

Permanent Secretary in the Office of the President and Cabinet of Zimbabwe Head - Corporate Governance, Parastatal Reform and Delivery Unit
- In office September 2014 – September 2018
- President: Robert Mugabe; Emmerson Mnangagwa
- Succeeded by: Willard Manungo

Ambassador of Zimbabwe to Japan and South Korea
- In office January 2003 – May 2014
- President: Robert Mugabe
- Minister: Simbarashe Mumbengegwi
- Preceded by: Andrew Hama Mtetwa
- Succeeded by: Titus Mehliswa Jonathan Abu-Basutu

Permanent Secretary for the Ministry of Industry and International Trade
- In office September 1999 – December 2002
- President: Robert Mugabe
- Minister: Nathan Shamuyarira; Nkosana Moyo; Herbert Murerwa; Samuel Mumbengegwi

Ambassador of Zimbabwe to Italy and Permanent Representative of Zimbabwe to the United Nations Food and Agriculture Organization, World Food Programme, and International Fund for Agricultural Development
- In office July 1994 – May 1999
- President: Robert Mugabe
- Minister: Nathan Shamuyarira

Trade Commissioner and Head of Mission, Zimbabwe Trade Mission, later, Zimbabwe Representative Office, Johannesburg, South Africa
- In office May 1987 – June 1994
- President: Canaan Banana; Robert Mugabe
- Minister: Witness Mangwende; Nathan Shamuyarira

Director, Information and Research Bureau, Ministry of Foreign Affairs Headquarters
- In office February 1982 – May 1987
- President: Canaan Banana
- Minister: Witness Mangwende

Head, Rhodesian Liaison Office, Libreville, Gabon
- In office October 1975 – November 1979
- President: Clifford Dupont; John Wrathall; Josiah Gumede
- Minister: Ian Smith; Abel Muzorewa

Personal details
- Born: 27 September 1952 Salisbury, Southern Rhodesia
- Died: 4 September 2025 (aged 72) United Kingdom
- Spouse: Benedict Ann Comberbach
- Education: University of the Witwatersrand

Stuart Harold Comberbach (27 September 1952 – 4 September 2025) was a Zimbabwean diplomat and politician. He served as Ambassador/Permanent Representative of Zimbabwe to the United Nations and other international organisations in Geneva, Switzerland.

Immediately prior to that, he served as a Special Advisor to the Minister of Foreign Affairs and International Trade of Zimbabwe, Lieutenant General (Rtd) Dr Sibusiso B. Moyo.

He served previously as Zimbabwe's Ambassador to Italy from 1994 to 1999, and later Ambassador to Japan and South Korea from 2003 to 2014, in 2014 Comberbach was named a senior advisor in the Office of the President and Cabinet under former President Robert Mugabe. Born in Salisbury (today Harare), Comberbach joined the Rhodesian civil service in 1974 and was one of the few white civil servants remaining in Zimbabwe.

== Early life and education ==
Comberbach was born on 27 September 1952 in Salisbury, Southern Rhodesia (today Harare, Zimbabwe). He attended the University of the Witwatersrand in Johannesburg, South Africa, graduating in 1974.

== Civil service career ==
After graduating from Wits University in 1974, Comberbach returned to Rhodesia and joined the civil service the same year. He worked under the Ministry of Foreign Affairs, serving in Gabon from 1974 to 1979. From 1987 to 1994, he was the head of the Zimbabwe Trade Mission in Johannesburg, South Africa. From 1994 to 1999, he served as Zimbabwe's Ambassador to Italy and the Permanent Representative of Zimbabwe to the United Nations' Food and Agricultural Organization. In Rome, he served on the UN Committee on World Food Security. He was Permanent Secretary for the Ministry of Industry and International Trade from 1999 to 2002. He offered to resign from the civil service in 2001 when he made it clear that he opposed government price control policies that he believed would destroy the Zimbabwean economy.

From 2003 to 2014, Comberbach served as the Ambassador of Zimbabwe to Japan and South Korea. He also served as Chairman of the African Diplomatic Corps in Japan, an arm of the Tokyo International Conference on African Development (TICAD) from January 2003 and May 2011. On 8 May 2015, Comberbach was honoured with the Order of the Rising Sun, along with 5 other foreign recipients at an event held in Tokyo. Later, a conferment ceremony was held in Harare, hosted by Japan's Ambassador to Zimbabwe, Yoshi Hiraishi. Minister of Welfare Services for War Veterans Christopher Mutsvangwa praised Comberbach for receiving the honour. In 2015, Comberbach's successor as Ambassador to Japan, was Air Vice-Marshal Titus Abu-Basutu.

In September 2014, President Robert Mugabe appointed Comberbach as Senior Secretary in the Office of the President and Cabinet. His appointment was announced by Mesheck Sibanda, Chief Secretary to the President and Cabinet. At the time, it was reported that he was one of the last white civil servants left in Zimbabwe. He was later assigned different areas of focus within the office of the President and Cabinet: in 2015, he became the Permanent Secretary for Corporate Governance, State Enterprises, and Delivery Unit. In September 2018, President Emmerson Mnangagwa appointed new advisors, and Comberbach was assigned the new portfolio of Special Advisor to the Minister of Foreign Affairs and International Trade.

== Personal life and death ==
Comberbach's wife was Benedict Ann "Dicky" Comberbach. They had children. One of them is Vancouver-based software engineer named Jonathan Edward Yelverton Comberbach.

Stuart Comberbach died by cancer on 4 September 2025, at the age of 72.

== Foreign honours ==
- Japan: Order of the Rising Sun (2015)
