= Stu =

Stu with a stew shirt.

Stu is a masculine given name or nickname, usually a shortened form (hypocorism) of Stuart or Stewart. It may refer to:

== Stuart ==
- Stu Barnes (born 1970), Canadian retired National Hockey League player
- Stu Block (born 1977), Canadian singer-songwriter
- Stu Briese (born 1945 or 1946), Canadian politician
- Stu Clancy (1906–1965), National Football League quarterback
- Stu Clarke (1906–1985), American Major League Baseball player
- Stu Clarkson (1919–1957), American National Football League player
- Stu Cook (born 1945) American musician, original bassist of Creedence Clearwater Revival
- Stuart Erwin (1903–1967), American actor
- Stu Fisher (fl. 2002–present), English rock drummer
- Stu Gardner, American musician and composer
- Stu Holcomb (1910–1977), American college football and basketball coach and general manager of the Chicago White Sox Major League Baseball team
- Stu Jackson (born 1955), American former National Basketball Association head coach and Executive Vice President
- Stu Kennedy (Canadian football) (1931–2021), Canadian football player
- Stu Laird (born 1960), former Canadian Football League player
- Stu Lang (born 1951), former Canadian Football League player, college head football coach
- Stu Lantz (born 1946), American retired National Basketball Association player, television commentator
- Stu Mackenzie (born 1990), Australian guitarist and singer, frontman of King Gizzard & The Lizard Wizard
- Stu Martin (baseball) (1912–1997), Major League Baseball player
- Stu Miller (1927–2015), American Major League Baseball pitcher
- Stu Mills (born 1982), New Zealand cricketer
- Stu Pederson (born 1960), Major League Baseball player
- Stu Phillips (composer) (born 1929), American film and television composer and record producer
- Stu Roberts (born 1965), New Zealand former cricketer
- Stu Rosen (1939–2019), American voice actor, television writer, and director
- Stu Smith (1915–1969), American National Football League player
- Stu Sutcliffe (1940–1962), British painter and musician, original bassist for The Beatles
- Stu Whittingham (born 1994), Scottish cricketer
- F. Stuart Wilkins (1928–2011), American football player, lawyer and businessman

== Stewart ==
- Stu Hart (1915–2003), Canadian amateur and professional wrestler, promoter and trainer
- Stu Linder (1931–2006), American film editor
- Ian Stewart (musician) (1938–1985), English keyboardist and co-founder of the Rolling Stones

== Other or indeterminate ==
- Steve Burguiere (born 1976), American radio producer
- Stu Davis (David Stewart; 1921–2007), Canadian singer
- Stu Jacobs (born 1965), New Zealand former footballer
- Stu Martin (drummer) (1938–1980), American jazz drummer
- Stu Nahan (1926–2007), Canadian-American sportscaster
- Stu Phillips (country singer) (1933-2025), Canadian
- Stu Rasmussen (born 1948), American politician
- Stu Williamson (1933–1991), American jazz trumpeter

== Fictional characters ==
- Stu, a character in the movie 2009 American comedy film The Hangover
- Stu Macher, a character in the 1996 American satirical slasher Scream, played by Matthew Lillard.
- Disco Stu, a recurring character in The Simpsons
- Stu Bergman, on the soap opera Search for Tomorrow
- Stu Redman, in Stephen King's The Stand
- Stu Pickles, in Rugrats
- Stu, in the 2006 animated film Ice Age: The Meltdown
- Stu, a fictional character in the American animated series Wow! Wow! Wubbzy!
- Stu, a bull villager from the video game series Animal Crossing
- Stu, a fictional character in the American-Canadian animated series Lyla in the Loop
- Stu, a Brawler in Brawl Stars
- Stu Hopps, a character in the Zootopia franchise

== See also ==
- stu, an ISO 639-3 code for the Blang language of Myanmar and China
- Stew (disambiguation), including a list of people named Stew
