= Mount Stuart (disambiguation) =

Mount Stuart is a mountain in the North Cascades range of Washington state, United States.

Mount Stuart or Mt Stuart can also refer to:

- Mount Stuart House, a house on the Isle of Bute in Scotland
- Mount Stuart, New Zealand, near Milton, New Zealand
- Mount Stuart, Tasmania, a suburb of Hobart in Australia
- Mount Stuart, Queensland, in the City of Townsville, Queensland, Australia

== Mountains ==
- Mount Stuart (Antarctica), a mountain in Victoria Land, Antarctica
- Mount Stuart (Queensland), a mountain overlooking Townsville, Queensland
- Central Mount Stuart in the Northern Territory, near the geographic centre of Australia

== See also ==
- Mount Stewart (disambiguation)
