= Mark Stewart (artist) =

American artist

Mark Stewart (born 1951 in Dallas, Texas) an American realist artist who paints primarily in watercolor. He is a graduate of Texas A&M University with a Bachelor of Environmental Design and master's degree in architecture. Upon completion of graduate school he received the American Institute of Architects Medal and Certificate for the Outstanding Graduate for the 1975–76 school year. He is a registered architect in the state of Texas. Since 1975 Mark has pursued dual careers, one in art and the other in architecture. Mark and his family currently reside in Houston, Texas.

Mark began drawing as a means of expression and exploration as a small child, but did not begin painting until after graduation from college. For the most part, he is self-taught, drawing experience from careful studies of the works of realist painters like Winslow Homer, Andrew Wyeth, Edward Hopper, and impressionist and abstract painters like Wolf Kahn and Cy Twombly. Concerning his subject matter, he likes to emphasize simpler things which suggest use by people, a time or an atmosphere. Finding and expressing mystery in everyday life has always been Mark's artistic credo...the patternless life and color of a crazy quilt, the silent invitation of a canoe waiting to cross the open water, the poignance of a child's abandoned tea party. Mark prefers realism, breaking from the current trends in American art toward abstraction and expressionism. His deep personal faith forms a basis from which to verify and depict reality. Not wanting to slavishly copy nature, he strives to observe and create an interpretation consistent with reality and his personal experience.

Since 1980, when Mark began commercially exhibiting his watercolors, he has had many one man exhibitions of his work and has been represented by galleries around the United States. The quality of his work has been recognized over the years in numerous art magazine articles, gallery shows and museum exhibits. While being featured twice in SouthWest Art magazine, his work appeared on the cover of the September 1987 issue. He has illustrated two book covers, and in 1988 New York Graphic Society began printing a selection of his work for worldwide distribution and in 2002 Bruce McGaw Graphics also began printing Mark's work.

== Gallery ==
Down River, 30"x43" watercolor by Mark Stewart
