= Stuart Mitchell (disambiguation) =

Stuart Mitchell (1965–2018) was a Scottish musician.

Stuart Mitchell may also refer to:

- Stuart Mitchell (American football) (born 1964)
- Stuart Mitchell (comedian) (born 1950), American comedian and songwriter known professionally as Heywood Banks
