= Justice Stuart =

Justice Stuart may refer to:

- Alexander Mackenzie Stuart, Baron Mackenzie-Stuart (1924–2000), president judge of the European Court of Justice
- Lyn Stuart (1920–2010), associate justice and acting chief justice of the Alabama Supreme Court
- William Corwin Stuart (1920–2010), associate justice of the Iowa Supreme Court
- William Z. Stuart (1811–1876), associate justice of the Supreme Court of Indiana

== See also ==
- Justice Stewart (disambiguation)
- Stuart Rabner (born 1960), chief justice of the New Jersey Supreme Court
- Jeremy Stuart-Smith (born 1955), justice of the Court of Appeal of England and Wales
