= Colin Stuart =

Colin Stuart may refer to:

- Colin Stuart (cricketer) (born 1973), Guyanese cricketer
- Colin Stuart (ice hockey) (born 1982), American professional ice hockey winger

== See also ==
- Colin Stewart (disambiguation)
