= Michael Shaw-Stewart =

Michael Shaw-Stewart may refer to:

- Sir Michael Shaw Stewart, 5th Baronet (1766–1825), Lord Lieutenant of Renfrewshire
- Sir Michael Shaw-Stewart, 6th Baronet (1788–1836), Scottish politician
- Sir Michael Shaw-Stewart, 7th Baronet (1826–1903), British politician
