= Stewart, Missouri =

Town in Pemiscot County, in the U.S. state of Missouri

Coordinates: 36°22′21″N 89°36′59″W

Stewart is an extinct town in Pemiscot County, in the U.S. state of Missouri. The GNIS classifies it as a populated place.

A post office called Stewart was established in 1872, and remained in operation until 1914. The community has the name of Robert Stewart, a local sheriff.
