= Stewart Peak =

Stewart Peak may refer to:

- Stewart Peak (Alaska)
- Stewart Peak (Antarctica)
- Stewart Peak (British Columbia)
- Stewart Peak (Colorado)
- Stewart Peak (New Mexico)
- Stewart Peak (Wyoming)
