= Stuart Gray =

Stuart Gray may refer to:

- Stuart Gray (basketball) (born 1963), American basketball player
- Stuart Gray (footballer, born 1960), English former footballer for Barnsley and Aston Villa, and football manager
- Stuart Gray (footballer, born 1973) (1973–2024), English-born Scottish football player
- Stuart Gray (musician) or Stu Spasm (born 1961), Australian musician and composer

== See also ==
- Stewart Gray (1862–1937), Scottish advocate
- Stewart Gray (footballer) (born 1950), English footballer
