= Stuart Wright =

Stuart Wright may refer to:

- Stuart A. Wright, American sociologist
- Stuart P. Wright (1903–1982), American athlete
- Stuart Pearson Wright (born 1975), English portrait artist
- Stuart Wright (rugby league) (born 1950), English rugby player
