= Stewart Township =

Stewart Township may refer to one of the following places:

In Canada

- Stewart Township, Ontario, a geographic township in Nipissing District, Ontario

In the United States

- Stewart Township, Barnes County, North Dakota
- Stewart Township, Kidder County, North Dakota
- Stewart Township, Pennsylvania
- Stewart Township, Tripp County, South Dakota

See also

- Stewart (disambiguation)
