= Stuart (automobile) =

Defunct American motor vehicle manufacturer

The Stuart Motors company of Kalamazoo MI produced a prototype electric vehicle in 1961. The car was the brainchild of Barry Stuart of Michigan. The station wagon was never made available for sale. There was seating for 2 adults and several children. It was designed with a 4 hp motor with eight 6-volt batteries. The body was made of fiberglass, and had a range of 40 miles per charge at 35 mph.

The Stuart Electric was highlighted in the January 1962 Popular Science magazine. It was targeted as a second family car that would only be driven a few miles a day. It was targeted to be sold for $1600, or a commercial unit for $1500. There were 8 units produced and they were plagued with the belt drives slipping as the motor was mounted to the fiberglass floor that would flex under load. The manufacturer was unable to warranty the units due to cash flow and the company went out of business.
