= Steward Creek =

Stream in Freeborn County, Minnesota, U.S.

Coordinates: 43°33′04″N 93°30′38″W

Steward Creek is a stream in Freeborn County, in the U.S. state of Minnesota. It was named for Hiram J. Steward, an early settler.

== See also ==
- List of rivers of Minnesota
