= Colin Stewart (alpine skier) =

American alpine skier (1927–2015)

Personal information
- Born: February 21, 1927 Hanover, New Hampshire, United States
- Died: March 6, 2015 (aged 88) Aurora, Colorado, United States

Sport
- Sport: Alpine skiing

Colin Stewart (February 21, 1927 – March 6, 2015) was an American alpine skier. He competed in the men's slalom at the 1948 Winter Olympics. He graduated from Dartmouth College and Harvard Graduate School of Design.
