= Mark Stuart =

Mark Stuart is the name of:

- Mark Stuart (footballer) (born 1966), English footballer
- Mark Stuart (ice hockey) (born 1984), ice hockey player in the National Hockey League
- Mark Stuart (inmate) (died 2003), Belizean shooting victim
- Mark Stuart (musician) (born 1968), former lead singer of Christian rock band Audio Adrenaline
- Mark Stuart, singer, guitarist and half of the duo Stacey Earle and Mark Stuart
- Mark Stuart, leader of country band Bastard Sons of Johnny Cash

== See also ==
- Mark Stewart (disambiguation)
