= Michael Stewart (pyropainter) =

The Pyropainter is a neo-gothic, surrealist artist by the name of Michael Stewart who lives in Philadelphia, Pennsylvania. He is the author of Scorched Earth, a hardcover collection of his artwork. He has been featured in a number of galleries on the East and West coast including Art At Large in New York City. Recently, his work won a page spread in Direct Art Magazine.

== Style ==
The Pyropainter gets his name from his method of creating art. First, he starts a controlled fire and takes pictures of the blaze, exploring the complex formations and capturing the natural movements of the flames on his digital camera. Next, he manipulates these images into a rough composition; making use of the organic essence of the fire to create a visually compelling foundation for the painting. After the base is completed, he brings the rough images to life by creating details with acrylics. His influences include H.R.Giger, Salvador Dalí, Francis Bacon, and Syd Mead.

== Career ==
- Halloween Exhibit, Los Angeles, CA Bar Sinister
- Day of the Dead Art shows in Santa Ana, CA Night Gallery
- Art At Large, New York, NY, Summer 2006
- Revelations, Las Vegas, NV, Summer 2007
- “Migraine” - Poster deal with Starmakers Rising, sold in Spencer’s in the U.S and Canada
- Scorched Earth - self-published collection of illustrations
- Wild fire animated movie pre-production
- pyro painter canvas wall art available through Art 2013

== Biography ==
Michael Stewart was born on May 2, 1979, at Albert Einstein Hospital in Philadelphia.

In 2001 Michael moved to Hollywood with the hope of obtaining a record deal.

He studied under Maya Gohill, who helped him expand his use of different mediums and break free from traditional techniques. At the same time, he became the Front Page Designer at Valley Press. In 2002, his garage band, control freak, signed a record deal with No Exit Records. Michael was ultimately dissatisfied by the one album they put out, which prompted him to focus his attention back on painting.

With a revived curiosity in the artistic quality of fire, Michael created digital compositions from the photos of the bonfires and forest fires and then painted over top of the prints to give more definition and depth to the print. He then took these paintings to Bar Sinister who agreed to display them on Halloween night of 2004. This was the springboard for Michael’s artwork being showcased around the L.A. area. Soon his art was in Night Gallery in Santa Anna; a gallery famous for Gothic work, which also featured successful artists like Toxic Tunes and Jhonen Vasquez. Being featured at Night Gallery started a chain reaction of a number of art shows in California. He was then invited to H.R. Gigers’ official New York gallery Art at Large, a prestigious underground NYC show in June 2006. Here he met Pat Sylvia and Leslie Barany among many others. After a three-year whirlwind of bar room exhibits, Michael was beginning to crave a change of scenery.

== The Sin City Invasion ==
Las Vegas, Nevada. Michael Started to work with Michael biggs gallery where he met Michael and Dasha Biggs fellow dark artists and surrealist painters who asked him to put his artwork in their gallery. They brought the house down during three apocalyptic shows a wild assault on Las Vegas.

Michael left with the friendship of the Michael Biggs. During his time on the west coast they collaborated on art projects and formed a coalition called Dark Division.

== Homecoming ==
In 2008 Michael Stewart left behind a growing artistic presence on the West Coast and went back to Philadelphia he was reunited and joined forces with fellow artist Jerry Feightner a photo manipulation artist also another member of Dark Division. they are both prominent forces in the New york city underground art scene Together they worked on their craft and did all they could to burst onto the New York City art scene. Currently, Michael is the head of the Design department at 1and1.com he does many art shows in New York and salem MA where his art has been widely excepted his art is always on display year round at the Gothic art store The Fools Mansion

== Dark Division ==
Dark Division is a group of artists who share similar ideas about compelling and cutting edge artwork. They originally joined forces to collaborate on art projects and still continue to encourage and support one another to this day. Dark Division consists of Pyro Painter, Jerry Feightner, and Joey Grave
