= Justice Stewart =

Justice Stewart may refer to:

- Potter Stewart (1915–1985), associate justice of the United States Supreme Court
- Andrew Stewart, 1st Lord Avandale (c. 1420–1488), Lord Chancellor of Scotland
- George H. Stewart (1858–1914), associate justice of the Idaho Supreme Court
- I. Daniel Stewart (1933–2005), associate justice of the Utah Supreme Court
- James Augustus Stewart (1808–1879), chief justice of the Court of Appeals of Maryland
- James Garfield Stewart (1880–1959), associate justice of the Ohio Supreme Court
- James Stewart, Duke of Ross (1476–1504), Lord Chancellor of Scotland
- Sam V. Stewart (1872–1939), associate justice of the Montana Supreme Court
- William Stewart, Lord Allanbridge (1925–2012), justice of the Supreme Courts of Scotland

== See also ==
- Judge Stewart (disambiguation)
- Justice Stuart (disambiguation)
