= David Stuart =

David Stuart may refer to:

== Public officials ==
- David Stuart (Virginia politician) (1753–1814), American doctor, politician and correspondent of George Washington
- David Stuart (brigadier general) (1816–1868), American general and congressman from Michigan
- David Stuart (diplomat), Australian ambassador, vice-chair of United Nations Commission on Sustainable Development in 2001

== Scholars ==
- David E. Stuart (born 1945), American anthropologist and novelist since 1960s
- David Stuart (structural biologist) (born 1953), English academic, X-ray crystallographer of viruses
- David Stuart (Mayanist) (born 1965), American archeologist and epigrapher

== Others ==
- David Stuart (fur trader) (c.1765–1853), American pioneer for North West and Pacific Fur companies
- Dave Stuart (1910–1984), American owner of Jazz Man Records, a/k/a David Ashford Stuart
- David Stuart (actor) (born 1965), Canadian TV performer

== See also ==
- David Stewart (disambiguation)
