= Stewards' Cup =

Stewards' Cup may refer to:

- Hong Kong Stewards' Cup a Thoroughbred horse race held at Sha Tin Racecourse in Hong Kong.
- Stewards' Cup (Great Britain), a Thoroughbred horse race held at Goodwood Racecourse in Great Britain
- Stewards' Cup (greyhounds), a leading UK greyhound competition
- Stewards' Challenge Cup, a rowing race at Henley Royal Regatta
