= David Stewart (cricketer, born 1948) =

Indian-born Scottish cricketer

Cricket information
- Batting: Right-handed
- Bowling: Right arm off-break

International information
- National side: Scotland

Career statistics
Competition	First-class	List A
Matches	32	14
Runs scored	854	273
Batting average	17.79	24.81
100s/50s	0/3	0/1
Top score	69	62
Balls bowled	90	–
Wickets	0	–
Bowling average	–	–
5 wickets in innings	–	–
10 wickets in match	–	–
Best bowling	–	–
Catches/stumpings	17/–	3/–
- Source: Cricinfo, 12 October 2022

David Ernest Robertson Stewart (born 22 May 1948) is an Indian-born former Scottish cricketer who played for Scotland and had a brief county cricket career with Worcestershire. He was born in Bombay in 1948.

Stewart played Second XI cricket for Warwickshire in 1966, but then moved to Worcestershire. He made his first-class debut for Scotland against Warwickshire at Edgbaston in June 1969, scoring 51 and 6 in a thrilling four-run Scottish victory. He also played for Scotland against Surrey later that year, then in 1970 played his first two first-class games for Worcestershire.

Stewart played eight first-class matches in 1971, the most of any single season in his career, although he averaged only 18. His 1972 and 1973 summers were similarly unconvincing, although he did make a match-winning 62 in a List A game against Glamorgan late in 1972 and a first-class career-best 69 against the New Zealanders in April of the following year.

He left Worcestershire after the 1973 season, and played exclusively for Scotland for the remainder of his career, captaining the side against Ireland in Clontarf, and hitting 53 and 10 in a victorious Scottish performance. His final first-class appearance was in the same fixture at Dublin two years later, though on this occasion he scored only 0 and 11, and Scotland lost by seven wickets.
