= Stewart =

Stewart may refer to:

== People ==
- Stewart (name), Scottish surname and given name
- Clan Stewart, a Scottish clan
- Clan Stewart of Appin, a Scottish clan

== Places ==
=== Canada ===
- Stewart, British Columbia
- Stewart Township, Nipissing District, Ontario (historical)

=== India ===
- Stewart Island (Andaman Islands), Indian island of Andaman Islands

=== New Zealand ===
- Stewart Island / Rakiura

=== United Kingdom ===
- Newton Stewart, Scotland
- Portstewart, Northern Ireland
- Stewartby, Bedfordshire, England

=== United States ===
==== Airports ====
- Stewart Air Force Base, New York, a former Air Force base and now-joint civil-military airport, shared by:
  - Stewart Air National Guard Base, New York
  - Stewart International Airport (also known as Newburgh-Stewart IAP), New York

==== Counties ====
- Stewart County, Georgia
- Stewart County, Tennessee

==== Localities ====
- Stewart, Alabama
- Stewart, Indiana
- Stewart, McLeod County, Minnesota, a city in McLeod County, Minnesota
- Stewart, Lake County, Minnesota, an unincorporated community in Lake County, Minnesota
- Stewart, Mississippi
- Stewart, Missouri
- Stewart, Ohio
- Stewart, Tennessee
- Stewart, Texas
- Stewart, West Virginia
- Fort Stewart, Georgia
- Stewart Manor, New York, a village in the Town of Hempstead, in Nassau County
- Stewart Township (disambiguation)
- Stewartstown, Pennsylvania

==== Counties ====
- Stewart County, Georgia
- Stewart County, Tennessee

=== Other Places ===
- Stewart (crater), a lunar impact crater

== Brands and enterprises ==
- Stewart's Shops, U.S. chain of convenience stores
- W.F. Stewart Company, an American carriage builder
- Stewart Information Services Corporation, an American Insurance company

== Other uses ==
- SS R.G. Stewart, a Lake Superior shipwreck off the coast of Wisconsin
- Stewart Grand Prix, later known as Jaguar Racing, now known as Red Bull Racing
- Stewart's theorem, a geometry theorem
- Stewart–Tolman effect, physics

== See also ==
- Sewart Air Force Base
- Steuart (disambiguation)
- Stew (disambiguation)
- Steward (disambiguation)
- Justice Stewart (disambiguation)
- Stuart (disambiguation)
