= Katie Stuart (disambiguation) =

Katie Stuart (born 1985) is a Canadian actress and stunt performer.

Katie Stuart may also refer to:

- Katie Stuart (politician), American politician
- Katie Stuart (reformer) (1862-1925), South African evangelist and temperance leader

== See also ==
- Katie Stewart (disambiguation)
