= STU =

STU may refer to:

== Universities ==
- Seoul Theological University, South Korea
- Shantou University, Shantou, Guangdong, China
- Shu-Te University, Yanchao District, Kaohsiung, Taiwan
- Slovak University of Technology in Bratislava (Slovak: Slovenská technická univerzita), Slovakia
- St. Thomas University (Florida), United States
- St. Thomas University (New Brunswick), Fredericton, New Brunswick, Canada

== Other uses ==
- STU-I, a model of secure telephone
- Special Tactical Unit, a counter terrorist unit in Odisha, India
- Theater Scena STU, in Kraków, Poland
- STU Co Ltd, management company of Japanese Idol Group STU48

== See also ==
- Stu or Stuart, a masculine given name
