= David Stewart (photographer) =

English photographer

David Stewart (born 1958 in Lancaster) is a British photographer and director, working in advertising and fine art photography. He is noted for his surreal and often humorous large format portraits.

Stewart began his career photographing tourists on Morecambe promenade and punk bands, including The Clash and The Ramones, as they performed at local venues. After studying photography at Blackpool and Fylde College, Stewart moved to London in 1981, assisting for three years before setting up his own studio. He has since become one of the most sought-after photographers in the U.K. splitting his time been working on personal projects and advertising commissions.

His first collection Cabbage, a surrealistic tribute to the much-maligned vegetable, was accompanied by a short film that was nominated for a BAFTA in 1995. Fogeys published in 2001 by Browns Editions, comprised "kitsch, cartoon-like photographs of people growing old disgracefully," whether zooming downhill on a go-kart or lounging in a coffin-shaped paddling pool. Fogeys also won a silver award at the Art Directors Club of New York.

In 2009 Stewart's latest book, Thrice Removed, was published by Browns Editions. In an interview with Creative Review at the launch event Browns Nick Jones explained Stewart's motivation for the project. “David came to us with the idea for a book on relationships, not just familial but also those tenuous ones we have with people we have met through someone else or those people who are interconnected through one person, in this case, David Stewart. Some of the images also comment on our relationships with societies or groups.” The launch itself was also somewhat unorthodox as Creative Review reported "Four images were represented by a Clydesdale horse called Buster, five disaffected teenage girls, who not only recreated the shot from the book, but also helped sell copies of the book on the night, two lumberjacks who performed wood chopping skills, and a chip van which provided food for the evening. In 2013 Teenage Pre-occupation, Teenage Pre-occupation was published by Browns Editions. Stewart says "I am presenting my observations of certain aspects of Teenage life from the outside. The teenagers in the pictures think they are just getting on with their normal lives, but when photographed certain things become more visible. Sometimes it may come across as quite a dark place to be, but there is an underlying British humour to the images found in the details. There is little that is gratuitous about the images and the deadpan nature of the expressions of the sitters allows the viewer to have their own interpretation". The Short film Stray was also released in 2013,

Stewart won The Taylor Wessing Photographic Portrait Prize in 2015 with his photograph "Five Girls 2014" The photograph is of his daughter and her friends, and mirrors a photograph he took of them seven years ago when they were about to start their GCSEs. He was previously shortlisted for the Photographic Portrait Prize in 2007 with "Alice & Fish," also featuring his 14-year-old daughter, and was accepted a further fourteen times between 1995 and 2012, each time exhibited at the National Portrait Gallery, London.

Stewart was the first photographer to be given the inaugural 'Award for Editorial, Advertising & Fashion Photography' by the Royal Photographic Society in 2016.
