= Grace Tsitsi Mutandiro =

Zimbabwean diplomat

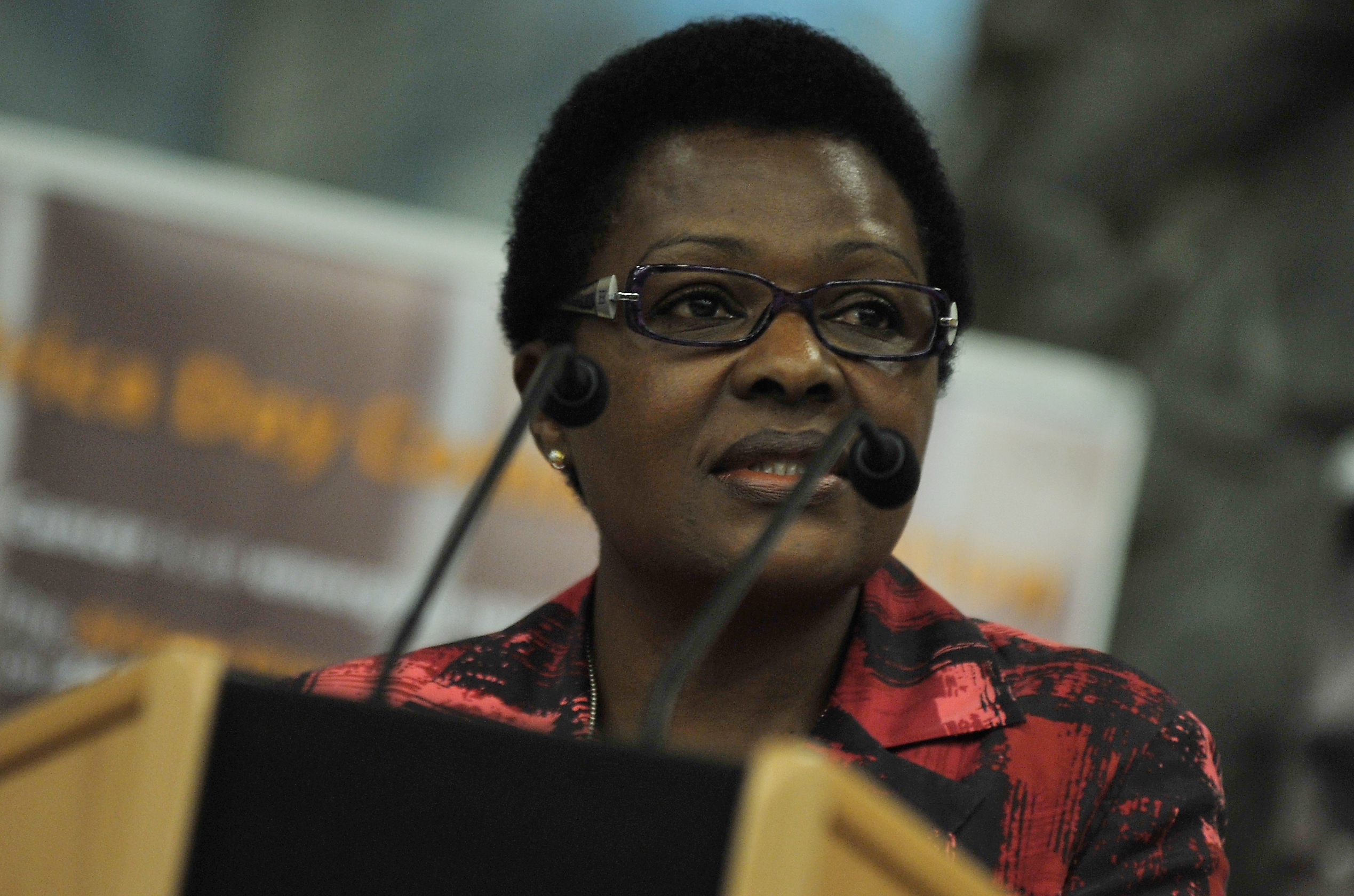
- Mutandiro in 2010

Personal details
- Born: c. 20th century
- Education: University of Rhodesia (Bachelor of Administration degree); University of South Africa (Bachelor of Laws degree)
- Occupation: Ambassador, diplomat

Grace Tsitsi Mutandiro is a diplomat from Zimbabwe who was a Commissioner of the Public Service Commission until November 2020. She was also Ambassador to Austria serving concurrently with appointments to the Czech Republic and Slovakia and was also Zimbabwe's Permanent Representative to the International Atomic Energy Agency (IAEA), the United Nations Organisation on Crime and Drugs (UNODC), United Nations Industrial Development Organization (UNIDO) and the Preparatory Commission for the Comprehensive Nuclear-Test-Ban Treaty Organization (CTBTO). She went on to serve as Secretary for Lands and Rural Resettlement since 2015, and then Secretary for Environment, Water and Climate from 2017 to 2018.

She served as a Counsellor at the Embassies of Zimbabwe in France and South Africa respectively. She was Special Assistant to the Chief Secretary to the President and Cabinet and Director in that office from 1997 to 2003.

Mutandiro earned a Bachelor of Administration degree at the University of Rhodesia (now known as University of Zimbabwe) in 1979 and a Bachelor of Laws degree at the University of South Africa in 2002.
