= Stew Leonard Jr. =

American supermarket CEO

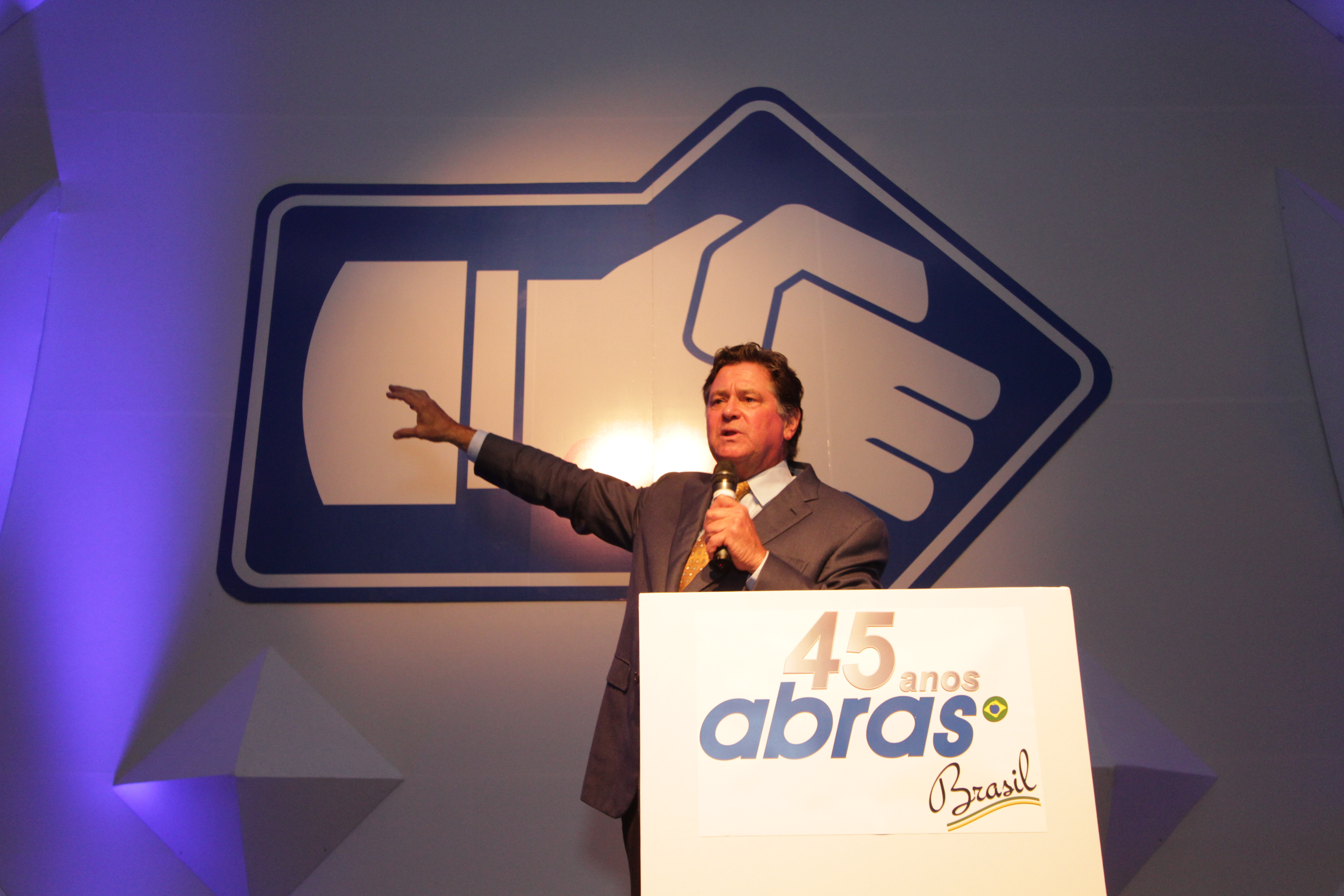
- Stew Leonard Jr. in 2013
- Born: 1954 (age 71–72)
- Education: Ithaca College (BS); UCLA (MBA)
- Occupations: President and CEO of Stew Leonard's
- Partner: Kim Kral (m. 1983)
- Children: 5

Stew Leonard Jr. (born 1954) is an American businessman who has been president and CEO of Stew Leonard's, a grocery store chain based in Connecticut, New York, and New Jersey, since 1991.

== Early life ==
Stew Leonard Jr. was born in 1954 to Marianne (née Guthman) and Stew Leonard Sr (1929-2023). Stew claims that his father was of Irish descent and his mother was of German Jewish descent. He comes from a long line of family members in the dairy business. His grandfather, Charles Leo Leonard, founded Clover Farms Dairy in Norwalk, Connecticut in the 1920s. The elder Leonard and his sons would deliver milk door-to-door straight from the farm. When Charles Leonard died, the business passed to Stew Leonard Sr., who wanted to move beyond being a milkman. Stew Leonard Sr. would then open the original Stew Leonard's dairy store in Norwalk in 1969. Stew Leonard Jr. often worked in that original dairy store as a child, washing out milk cans, loading egg shelves, and performing other basic tasks. Leonard graduated from Staples High School in Westport, Connecticut in 1972.

Leonard later attended Ithaca College, earning a Bachelor of Science in Accounting in 1977. He continued his education at UCLA's Anderson School of Management, where he earned a Master of Business Administration in 1982.

== Career ==
Stew Leonard Jr. first took over the helm of Stew Leonard's in 1991, after his father Stew Leonard Sr. was charged with a $17 million tax fraud by the IRS. At the time, there was some major concern about Stew Leonard Jr.'s ability to continue the success that the chain had experienced under his father.

The first few years were turbulent under Stew Leonard Jr., but he quickly turned it around. The store in Norwalk was earning less than $100 million in 1991, but, by 2002, Leonard had helped increase sales to $300 million with 3 stores. Leonard attributes the success of the company to its emphasis on customer service and employee care.

Under Stew Leonard Jr., the grocery store chain has also been recognized as one of the best places to work in the nation. 82% of all managers are promoted from within, and Stew Leonard's frequently applies positive reinforcement to boost employee morale. In 1999, Stew Leonard spearheaded the opening of a store in Yonkers, New York. The store continued the "Disneyesque" theme, but it also housed the first Stew Leonard's Wines store.

By 2014, Leonard had helped grow the business to four grocery stores. Additionally, there are 9 wine stores across Connecticut, New York, and New Jersey, each of which is independently owned and operated by family members. The food and wine stores cumulatively employ 2,000 people and approach $400 million in sales per year. This is despite the fact that the company (proudly) offers only 2,000 items, a large majority of which is perishable and prepared food.

The success of these business principles has gained Stew Leonard Jr. a significant degree of respect in the retail industry. Stew Leonard's Wines was also recognized by Wine Enthusiast Magazine as the Retailer of the Year in 2011 and 2013. Leonard is a prominent public speaker and is featured as one of the top orators at the prestigious Washington Speakers Bureau.

== Personal life ==
Leonard married Kim Kral in 1983. They met while attending college together at UCLA. Together, they had five children: four daughters and one son. In 1989, their son, Stew "Stewie" Leonard III, drowned at 21 months old.

== Philanthropy ==
Leonard and his wife, Kim, founded the Stew Leonard III Children's Charities, which offer swimming lessons to thousands of underprivileged youths each year. They have also released a series of children's books about water safety that feature the character, Stewie the Duck. In 2012, they released an app version of the children's book with Stewie the Duck at the forefront. A program featuring the character has been used by firefighters in Rialto, California and employees at a children's hospital in Phoenix, Arizona to teach children about water safety.

== Awards ==
Leonard was awarded the Dale Carnegie Leadership Award.
