= Stew Leonard's =

American supermarket chain

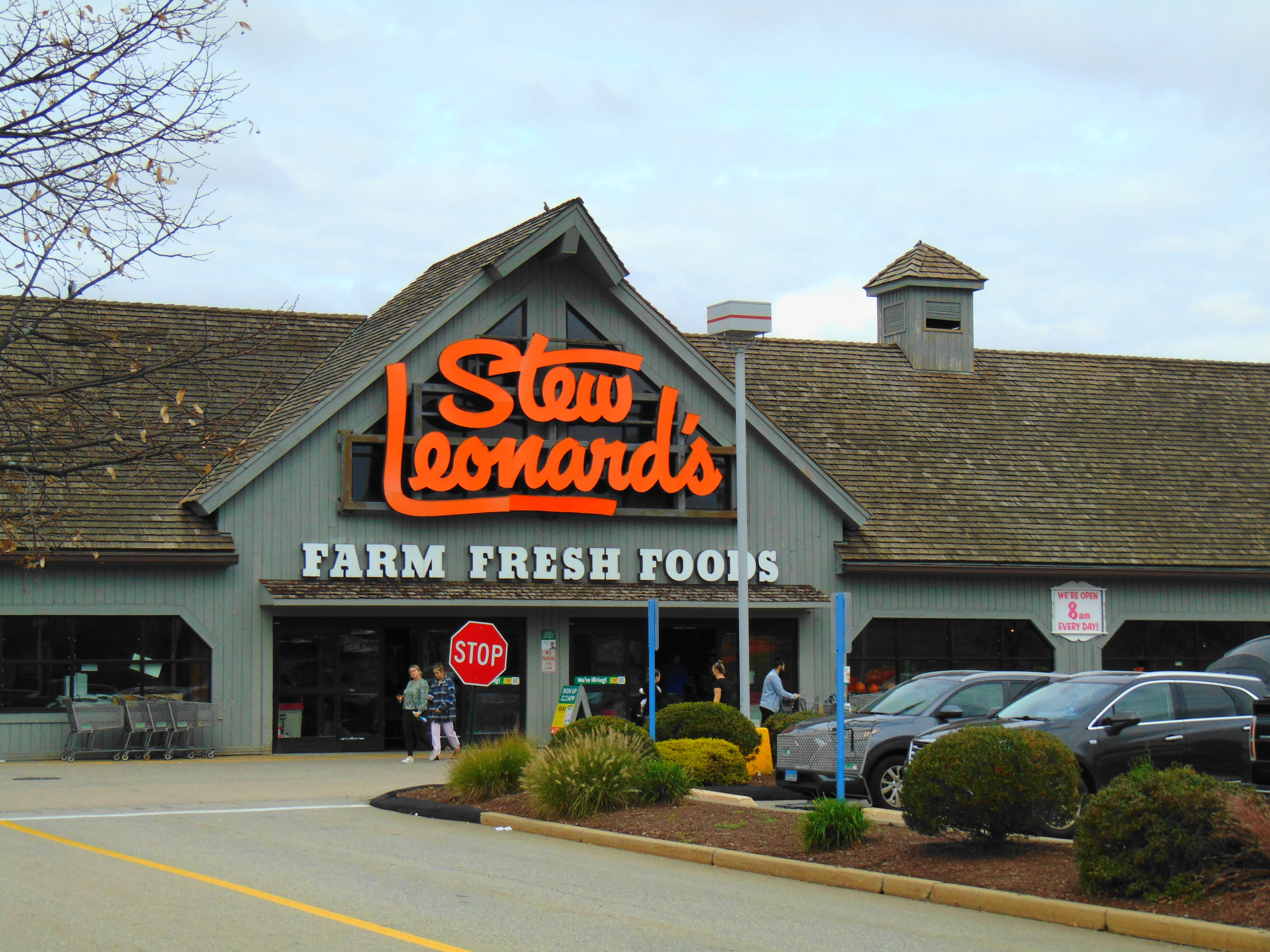
- Store in Newington, Connecticut
- Type: Private
- Industry: Grocery store
- Founded: 1969; 57 years ago Norwalk, Connecticut, U.S.
- Headquarters: Norwalk, Connecticut, U.S.
- Number of locations: 8 (2024)
- Key people: Stew Leonard Jr. (Owner, President & CEO)
- Products: Food
- Revenue: $341 million (2011)
- Number of employees: 2,226 (2011)
- Website: stewleonards.com

Stew Leonard's is an American regional chain of eight grocery stores in Connecticut, New York, and New Jersey, which Ripley's Believe It or Not! deemed "The World's Largest Dairy Store" and Fortune magazine listed as one of the "100 Best Companies to work for" in 2011.

Opened in 1969 with seven employees in Norwalk, Connecticut, the chain now includes eight stores in Connecticut, New Jersey, and New York.

The store has a customer-service policy which greets shoppers at each store's entrance, etched into a three-ton rock.

== History ==
Charles Leonard, a hatter in a sweatshop, founded Clover Farms Dairy in Norwalk, Connecticut, in the early 1920s. Charles' son, Stew Leonard, opened a small dairy store in 1969. By the end of the first year, the store had 10,000 weekly customers. The store soon expanded beyond dairy to include general grocery items. Stew's son, Stew Leonard Jr., helped by performing basic tasks such as washing out milk cans, loading egg shelves before becoming a cashier when he turned 14.

Stew Leonard Jr. took over as the CEO of Stew Leonard's in 1991, after his father, Stew Leonard Sr., was charged with a $17million tax fraud by the IRS.

Stew Leonard's son, Tom Leonard, opened Tom Leonard's Farmer's Market in Short Pump, Virginia, in 2004. Stew Leonard branded products are sold at the store.

The original Stew Leonard's store earned a position in the Guinness Book of World Records for having the highest dollar of sales per square foot of selling space and for a 3,500-pound sculpture made of sharp cheddar cheese.

Stew Leonard Sr., the founder of the Stew Leonard's chain, died on April 26, 2023, at the age of 93.

== Locations ==
As of 2025, there are eight locations:

- Clifton, New Jersey – opened in 2024
- Danbury, Connecticut – opened in 1991
- East Meadow, New York – opened in 2017
- Farmingdale, New York – opened in 2016.
- Newington, Connecticut – opened in 2007
- Norwalk, Connecticut – opened in 1969
- Paramus, New Jersey – opened in 2019
- Yonkers, New York – opened in 1999

== Store layout ==
Stew Leonard's stores are not set up like traditional grocery stores. The store is set in a maze and aisles guide customers to walk through the entire store (although there are short cuts). As customers walk through the aisles, they are greeted by employees dressed up in costumes and by animatronic characters that sing songs. One of the characters is a duck wearing a personal flotation device and singing a song about drowning prevention, in memory of the founder's grandson, who drowned in a swimming pool at the age of 3. The stores also feature agritourism, soft serve ice cream which is free after a customer spends $100, petting zoos and outdoor cafes in the warmer months. Stew's also offers tasting booths and a variety of prepared meals year round.

The New York Times called Stew Leonard's the "Disneyland of Dairy Stores."

== Controversies ==
In 1993, Stew Leonard Sr. was convicted of having committed tax fraud via an elaborate scheme to divert more than $17.1 million in cash register receipts over a 10-year period. The fraud, which involved a computer program designed to skim off sales, was directed by Stew Leonard Sr. in concert with the company's CFO and store manager. Skimmed cash was placed in bundles in Leonard Sr.'s office fireplace, to be later moved offshore or disguised as gifts. Leonard Sr. was caught in June 1991 while he was carrying $80,000 cash to the Caribbean island of Saint Martin.

On January 11, 2024, New York City resident Órla Baxendale died from anaphylactic shock shortly after eating a mislabeled cookie product sold under Stew Leonard's brand name. The label did not show that peanuts were a key ingredient in the recipe. Stew Leonard's claimed that the manufacturer, Cookies United in Islip, New York, changed the recipe without notifying retailers. Cookies United came forward with multiple emails proving that they did inform retailers about the change, and they pointed out that Stew Leonard's packages the cookies themselves.

== See also ==
- Jungle Jim's International Market
