= Davie Stewart =

Scottish footballer

Personal information
- Full name: David Stewart
- Place of birth: Scotland
- Position: Wing half

Senior career*
| Years | Team | Apps | (Gls) |
- Larkhall Thistle
| 1946–1947 | Hamilton Academical | 21 | (0) |
| 1948–1952 | Queen's Park | 6 | (0) |
| 1953 | Eaglesham | | |

International career
| 1953 | Scotland Amateurs | 3 | (0) |
- * Club domestic league appearances and goals

David Stewart was an amateur Scottish football wing half who played in the Scottish League for Hamilton Academical and Queen's Park. He was capped by Scotland at amateur level.
