= Lapa do Santo =

Archaeological site in Minas Gerais, Brazil

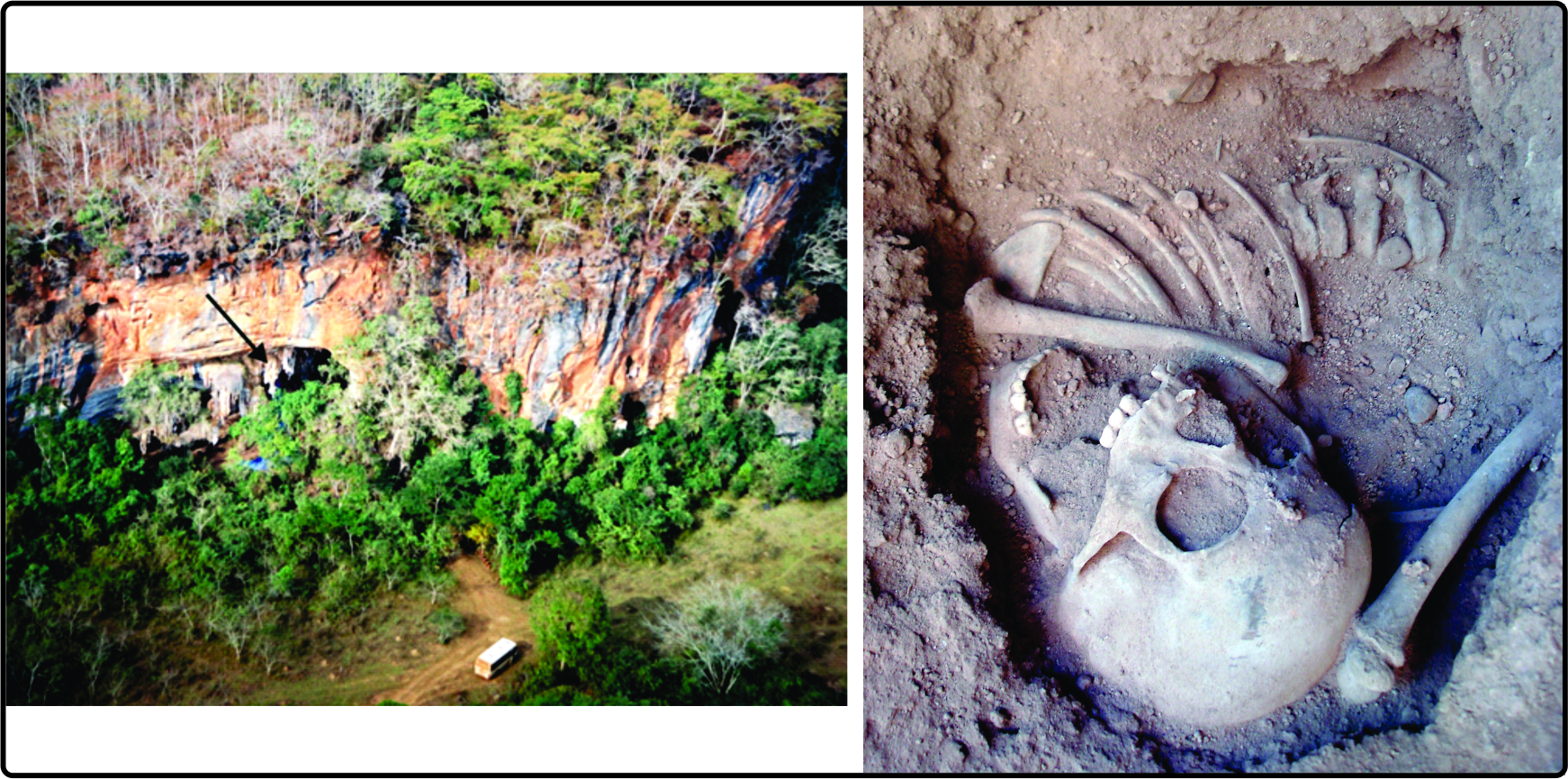
- Lapa do Santo. Aerial view of the site and human skeleton.

- Location in Minas Gerais, Brazil
- 19°28′40″S 44°02′20″W
- Type: limestone rockshelter
- Location: Minas Gerais, Brazil

History
- Built: c. 8500 BC
- Abandoned: c. 7400 BC

Site notes
- Area: 1,300 m^{2} (13,993 sq ft)

Lapa do Santo is an archaeological site located in the northern part of the Lagoa Santa karst, in the state of Minas Gerais in east-central Brazil. It documents human presence since ca. 8500 BC presenting three discrete occupation phases that correspond to the early, middle and late Holocene. Lithic technology, zooarchaeology, and multi-isotopic analyses indicate groups of hunter gathers with low mobility and a subsistence strategy focused on gathering plant foods and hunting small and mid-sized mammals. The use of Lapa do Santo as an interment ground started between 10.3 and 10.6 cal kyBP with primary burials. Between 9.6 and 9.4 cal kyBP, central elements in the treatment of the dead were tooth removal, mutilation, defleshing, exposure to fire and possibly cannibalism, all to reduce the body ahead of reburial of the remains while adhering to strict rules. In the absence of monumental architecture or grave goods, these groups were using parts of fresh corpses to elaborate their rituals. As part of this funerary agenda Lapa do Santo presents the oldest case in the New World of decapitation. Another type of burial included pits filled with separated bones of a single individuals presenting abundant evidence of perimortem fracturing. Lapa do Santo also presents a rare instance of securely dated rock art: an early Holocene low relief anthropomorphic figure depicting a phallus.

== History of research ==
Lagoa Santa is located in east-central Brazil and is well known among archaeologist and paleontologists since the 19th century. The first human skeletons were found by the Danish naturalist Peter Lund between 1835 and 1844 in the Sumidouro cave in association with bones of extinct megafauna. Due to this putative coexistence of humans and megafauna, Lagoa Santa became the focus of many 19th century scholars. During the 20th century, different teams went to the region pursuing to find evidence that could confirm the coexistence hypothesis. As a result of more than 170 years of excavations, a large collection of early Holocene skeletons was formed. However, all those excavation were done in a time when proper documentation was not available and therefore they considerably lack contextual information. Coordinated by Prof. Walter Neves of University of São Paulo and funded by the São Paulo State Grant Foundation (FAPESP) the project "Origins and Microevolution of Man in America: a Paleoanthropological Approach" aimed to overcome this situation by identifying and excavating new sites in Lagoa Santa region. Excavations took place between 2001 and 2009 under the coordination of Renato Kipnis, Astolfo Gomes Melo Araujo and Danilo Bernardo. Starting in 2001, several units were open in distinct areas of the shelter. It became apparent that the densest archaeological deposits were located in the south part of the shelter, immediately in front of the cave's entrance. An ample excavation surface was established in this region becoming the Main Excavation Area (MEA). All human burials were found in the MEA. Excavations of the MEA ended in 2009 when, according to Brazilian laws, the excavated area was filled with sediments recomposing the original topography of the shelter's floor. In 2011, a new excavation area was open in Lapa do Santo as part of another research project. Entitled "The Mortuary Rituals of the First Americans" and coordinated by André Strauss and Rodrigo Elias Oliveira this was a joint venture between the Department of Human Evolution of the Max Planck Institute for Evolutionary Anthropology and the Institute of Biosciences of University of São Paulo.

== The rockshelter and the archaeological site ==
"Lapa" and "Santo" are the Portuguese words for, "rockshelter" and "saint". Lapa do Santo is a cave with an associated sheltered area of ca. 1,300 m^{2}. The southern region of the sheltered area has a relatively flat, height and dry area located immediately in front of the cave's entrance. The floor of the shelter has a strong descending inclination towards the north, which becomes flat again near a natural sinkhole located at the northern extreme of the sheltered area.

A three-dimension coordinate system (x, y, z) was established in Lapa do Santo. The y-axis was conveniently oriented following the longer dimensions of the sheltered area, which is, in turn, roughly aligned with the geographic north–south axis (increasing towards the north). Therefore, the y-axis is also referred to as the north–south or N-S axis. The x-axis is perpendicular to the y-axis and is therefore roughly aligned with geographic east–west (increasing towards east). The x-axis is also referred to as the east–west or E-W axis. X-axis and y-axis define a horizontal plane. The z-axis is perpendicular to the plane defined by x-axis and y-axis and is therefore also referred to as the vertical axis or absolute depth (decreasing with progressive depth). The origin of the coordinate system (i.e. x=0, y=0, y=0) was conveniently positioned outside the sheltered area. An arbitrary grid with squares of 1 meter per side was established starting from the origin of the coordinate system. In the x-axis, each one-meter interval was sequentially labeled with letters (A, B, C, D, etc.) and in the y-axis, each one-meter interval was sequentially labeled with numbers (1, 2, 3, 4, 5, etc.). The excavation of the site followed this grid and the unit's code refers to this system (e.g. L11, B13, Z14).

Lapa do Santo - Rock shelter and surroundings

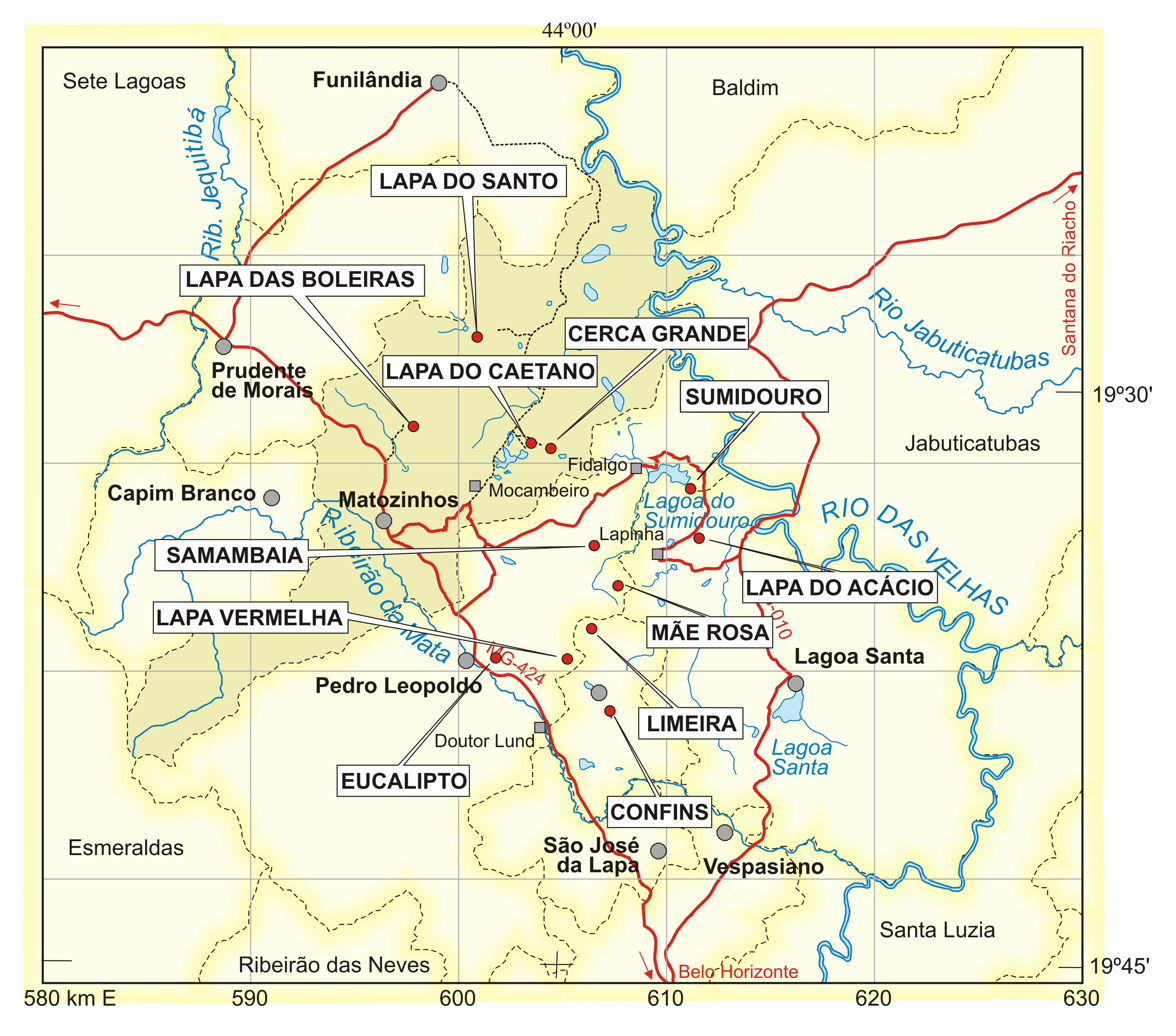
Lapa do Santo. Map with location of sites with human remains in Lagoa Santa region

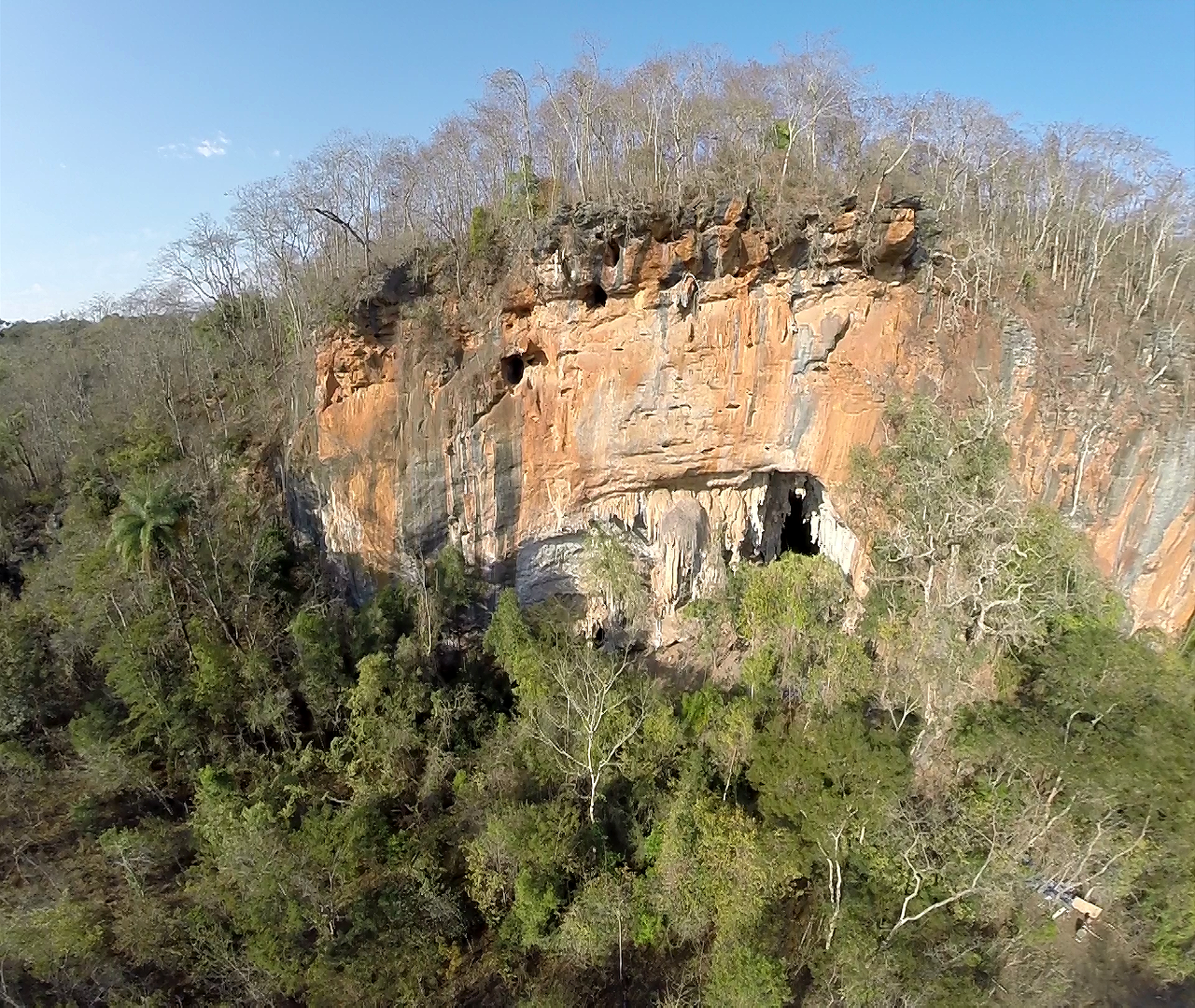
Lapa do Santo. Frontal view showing the cave entrance and sheltered area (drone).

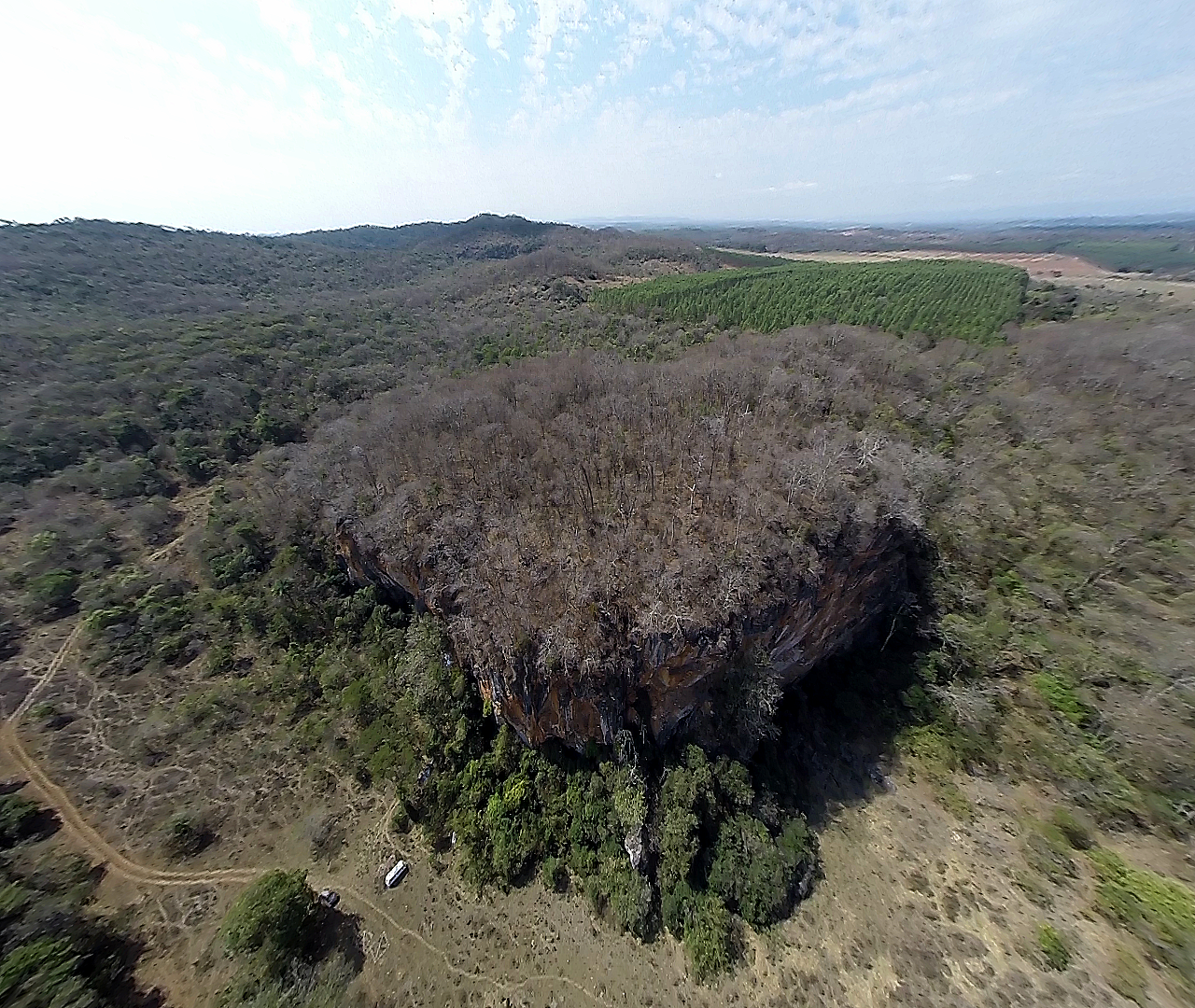
Lapa do Santo. High view the limestone massif in its totality (drone).

Lapa do Santo. Drone fly over the site.

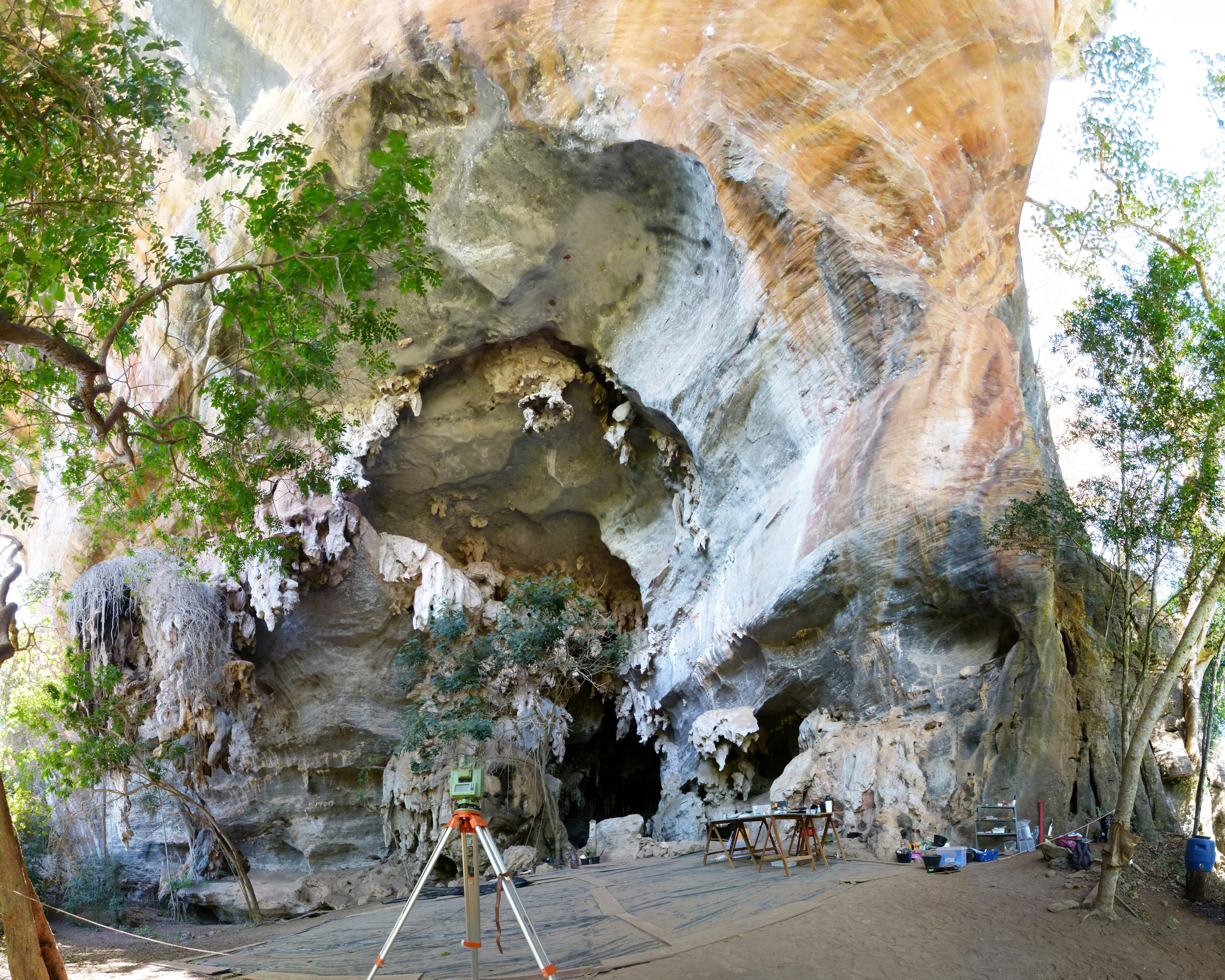
View from the rockshelter entrance

Lapa do Santo. Inside drone tour.

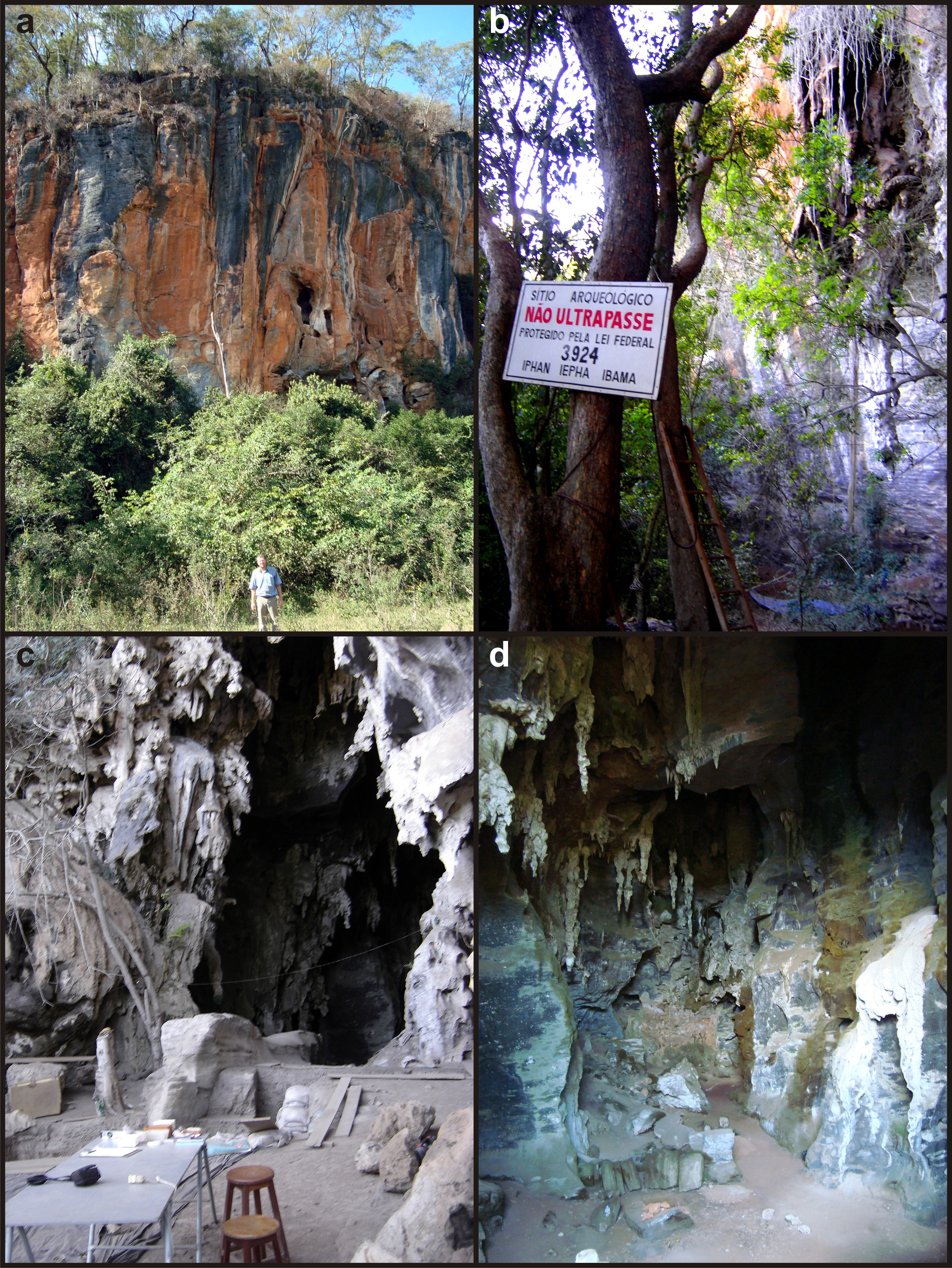
Lapa do Santo - Overview

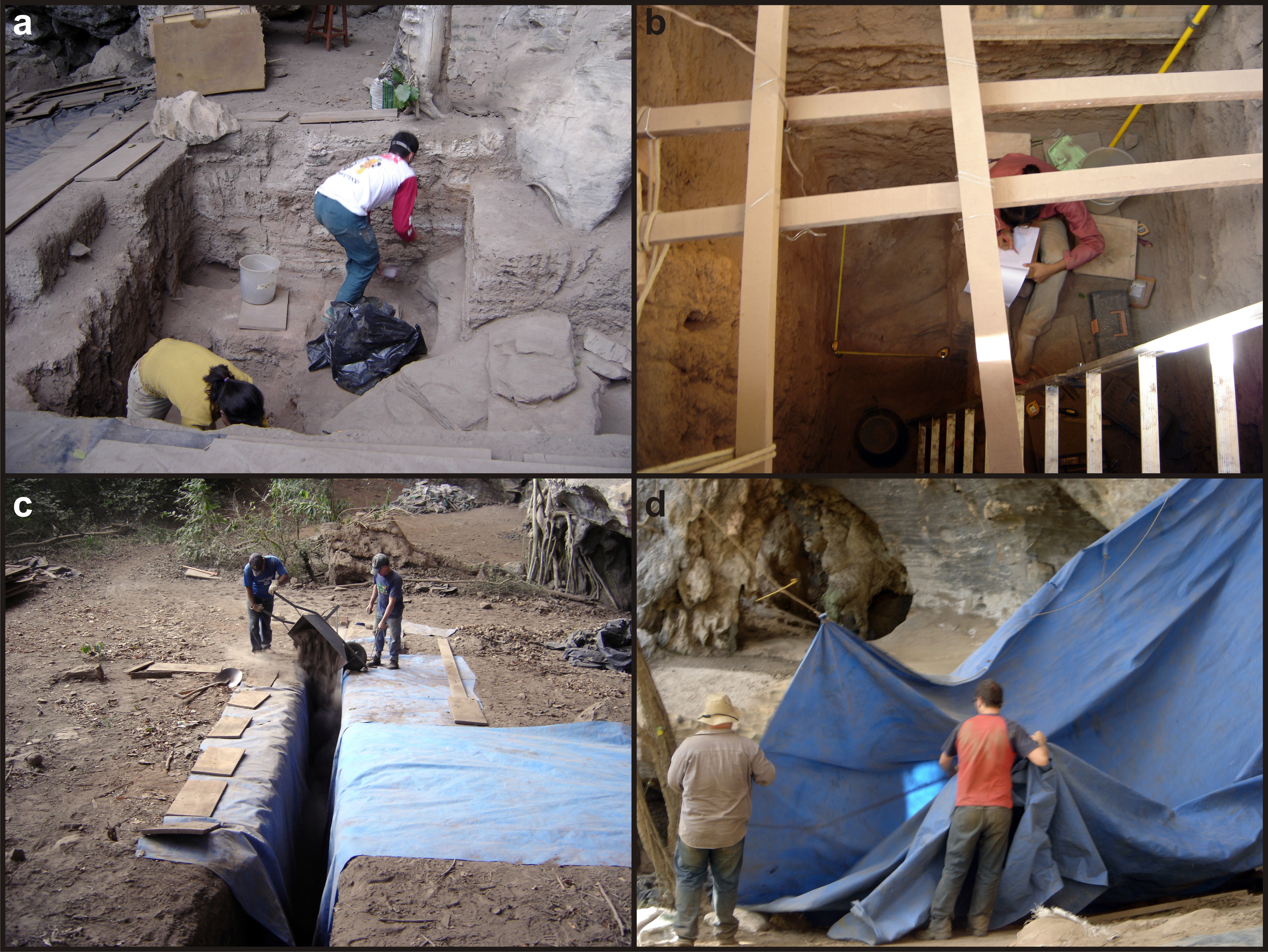
Lapa do Santo - Main areas of excavation.

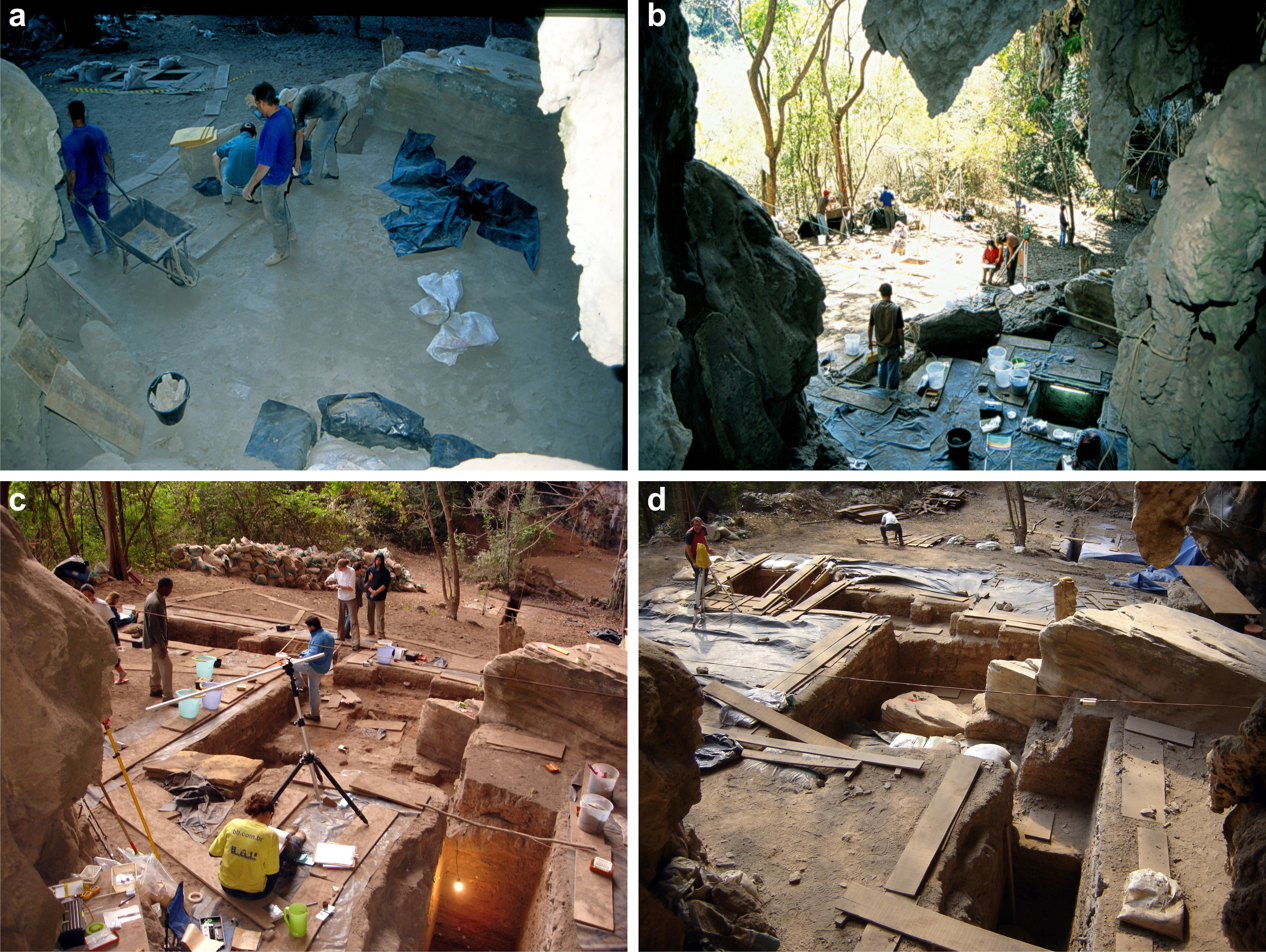
Sequence of excavations between 2001 and 2009.

Map of the shelter with excavated area in red.

Lapa do Santo. Video tour 2011

== Physical setting ==
Lapa do Santo is located in Lagoa Santa region, eastern central Brazil. Lagoa Santa is an environmentally protected area comprising 360 km^{2}. The vegetation is dominated by savanna (cerrado) and semi-deciduous forest. The rivers Mocambo, Samambaia, Jaguara and Gordura make up a tributary net that flows west to east to Velhas River, the main river in the area. Geomorphologically Lagoa Santa is a karstic terrain that can be divided into four distinct domains: 1) below 660 meters above sea level (masl) the terrain is characterized by a fluvial plain connected with the regional base level (Velhas River); 2) between 660 and 750 masl there is a karstic plain with dolines and lakes 3) between 750 and 850 masl there are karstic plateaus characterized by the presence of limestone outcrops (reaching up to 75 meters in height); 4) above 850 masl residual peaks composed of the non-soluble metasedimentary rocks from the Serra da Santa Helena Formation. The Lagoa Santa region geology comprises Sete Lagoas Formation and Serra da Santa Helena Formation, both part of the Upper Proterozoic metasediments of the Bambuí Group of the São Francisco craton. This cratonic cover metamorphosed during the Brazilian Cycle (700-450 million years ago) in a process that resulted in planar structures, such as lineation and foliation, and sub-vertical structures, such as normal and revert faults. The combination of these structures provides the path for the geomorphologic evolution that leads to the rockshelter configurations found in the region. The regional rockshelters and outcrops are developed in the limestone of the Sete Lagoas Formation. More specifically, Lapa do Santo rockshelter developed in the Member Pedro Leopoldo that is composed by very pure limestones with more than 90% calcite. The annual mean temperature is 23 °C, with lower temperatures (11 °C) occurring between June and July and higher temperatures (35 °C) occurring between October and November. The average humidity is around 65% in the dry season, from May to September, and around 85% on the rainy season, from November to April, with a pluviometrical mean of 1,400 mm/year. The major climatic characteristic of this region is the high concentration of rain during the rainy season (93% of total volume). When evaporation is analyzed, the region presents an annual deficit of 176 mm. Despite these particular variations, the regional climate is classified as tropical, with a rainy summer and dry winter. During dry periods, the above ground water sources can become very scarce although underground drainages are capable of keeping the discharge in Velhas River.

== Chronology ==
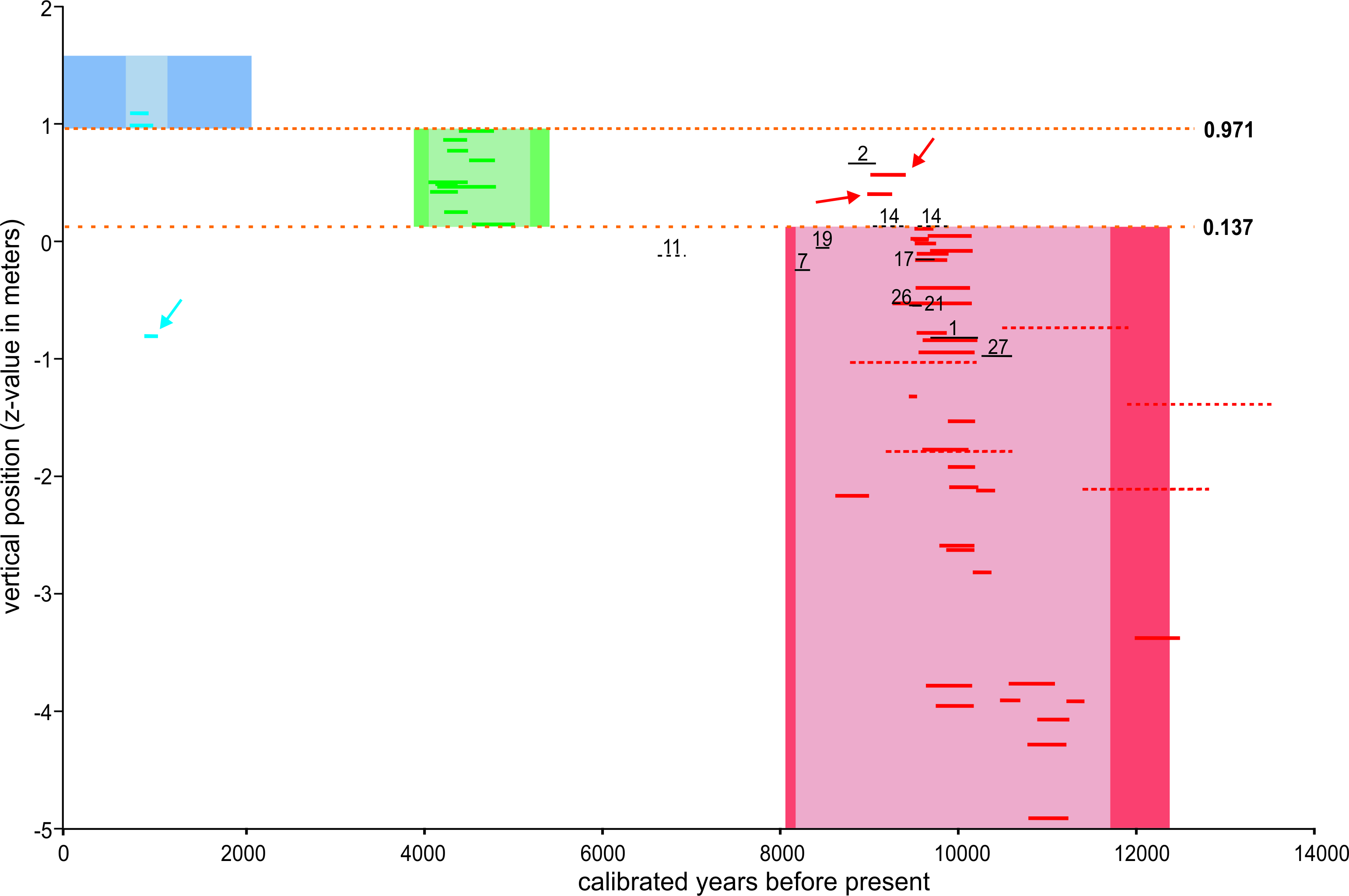
Graph showing all dates of Lapa do Santo relative to depth (z-value).

The chronology of the site is based on OSL and radiocarbon dating and it defines three distinct human occupation periods with the oldest one starting at 12.7-11.7 cal kyBP (all chronological ranges are based on a 95.4% interval). If we consider a 95.4% confidence interval Lapa do Santo's Period 1 (LSP-1) starts at 12.7 cal kyBP and ends at 7.9 cal kyBP, Lapa do Santo's Period 2 (LSP-2) starts at 5.4 cal kyBP and ends at 3.9 cal kyBP; Lapa do Santo's Period 3 (LSP-3) starts at 2.1 cal kyBP and ends at 0.0 cal kyBP. When the three periods are considered there is a very good agreement between vertical position (i.e., z-value) and dated charcoals showing the stratigraphic integrity of the deposits. At Lapa do Santo a total of 63 charcoal samples were selected for radiocarbon dating. Of those 53 were sent to the Beta Analytic AMS system in Miami and 10 to the Oxford Radiocarbon Accelerator Unit. In total 21 sediment samples were collected for luminescence dating, including two outside the shelter in the lake basin. The samples were mainly collected from test unit Q48 in the northern part of the shelter, from a T-shaped trench extending from the northern to southern part of the shelter, and from test units F13 and M6 in the main area of excavation. Analysis were conducted by Prof. James K. Feathers of the University of Washington. According to the OSL samples the earliest human occupation appears to date from about 9.0 to 12.0 kyBP, consistent with other paleoindian occupations in Lagoa Santa. In the unit F13 dates are at least two thousand years older than the dates obtained from radiocarbon.

== Formation processes and stratigraphy ==
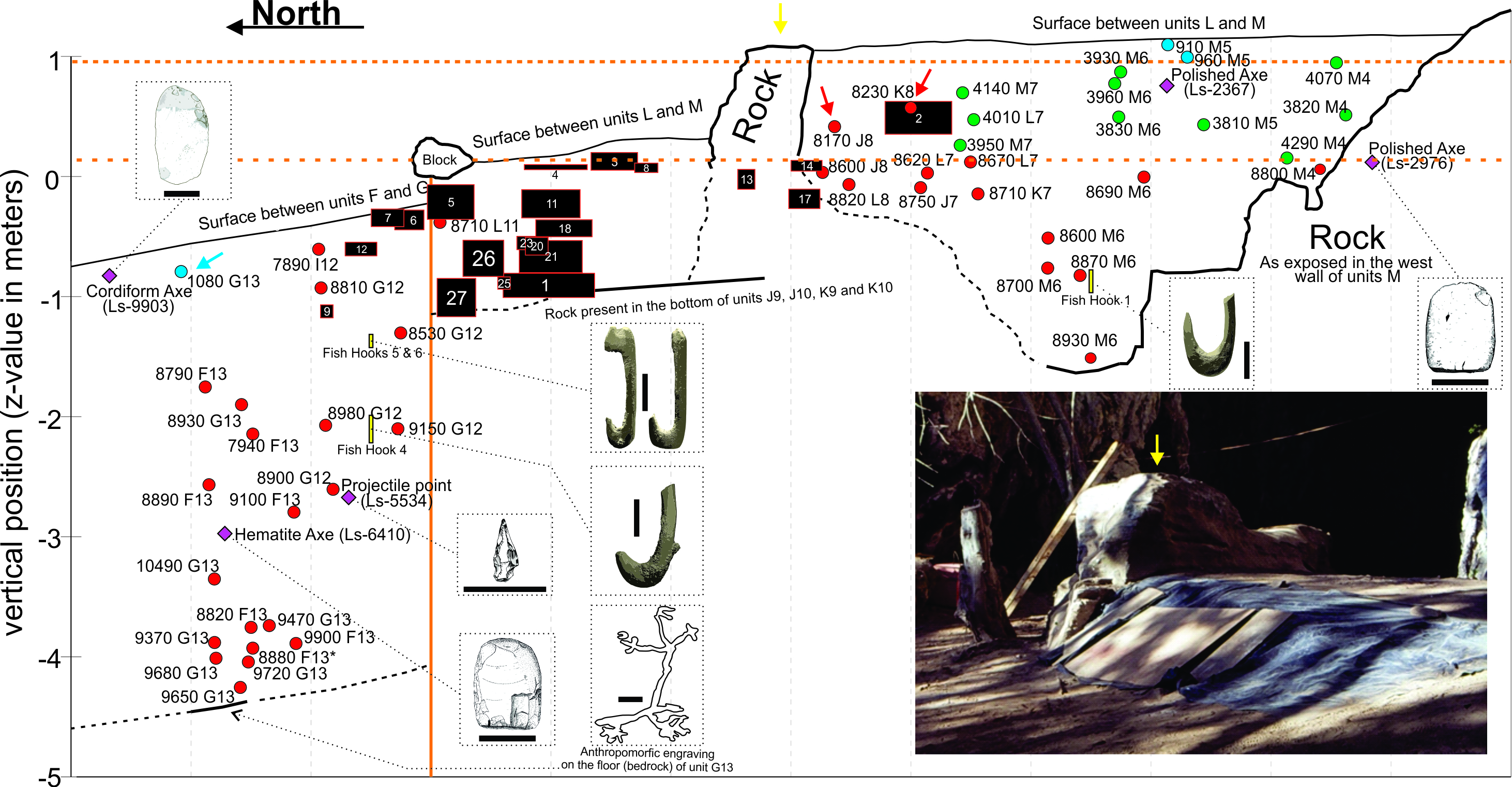
Section showing the location of key elements of the site. Dated charcoal are shown as colored circles.

Formation process analysis characterizes Lapa do Santo's deposits as mainly anthropogenic and composed by repeated combustion activities, indicating an intense occupation of the same locality over time. The macro stratigraphy of Lapa do Santo shows an intercalation of layers with diffuse to sharp boundaries that can be divided into three main categories, from the more to the less frequent: 1) tabular, grey, centimetric layers of powdery carbonate sediments, with common sand grains and frequent to common red clay aggregates and charcoal (20-40 %); 2) lenticular, red centimetric layers of indurated clay minerals with rare charcoal fragments; 3) lenticular, black, milimetric and centimetric layers, with high concentration of charcoal and microcharcoal. The ash crystals are described as rhombohedric micro-crystalline calcite crystals (10-30 μm). The crystals develop after burning of the calcium oxalates that naturally appear in the plant cells at temperatures around 400-600 °C. Ash crystals, also described as pseudomorphs of calcium oxalate into calcite (POCC), are the diagnostic micromorphological trait of plant ashes. Ash crystals have an overall good preservation. The clay aggregates are always blocky, angular to sub-rounded. They appear in frequencies from 10 to 70% and show three distinct colors: red, orange and yellow. The differences could be related with the natural Fe_{2}O_{3} content or to the anthropic modification of the clay aggregates (by human fires), as suggested by the dark red rims. Bioturbation of the sediments is indicated by channel and chamber voids, seen in most of the thin sections, passage features and large faunal channels. However, bioturbation was generally not intense since fragile components, such as tissue residues, laminations of fine plant tissue and articulated ashes show good integrity. The mixing of geogenic (clay aggregates) and anthropogenic sediments (ashes) seen in Lapa do Santo is a frequent characteristic in rockshelters of Lagoa Santa. Ashes from anthropic fires have been described in the sediments of Lapa das Boleiras and Lapa Grande de Taquaraçu.

Anthropogenic deposits

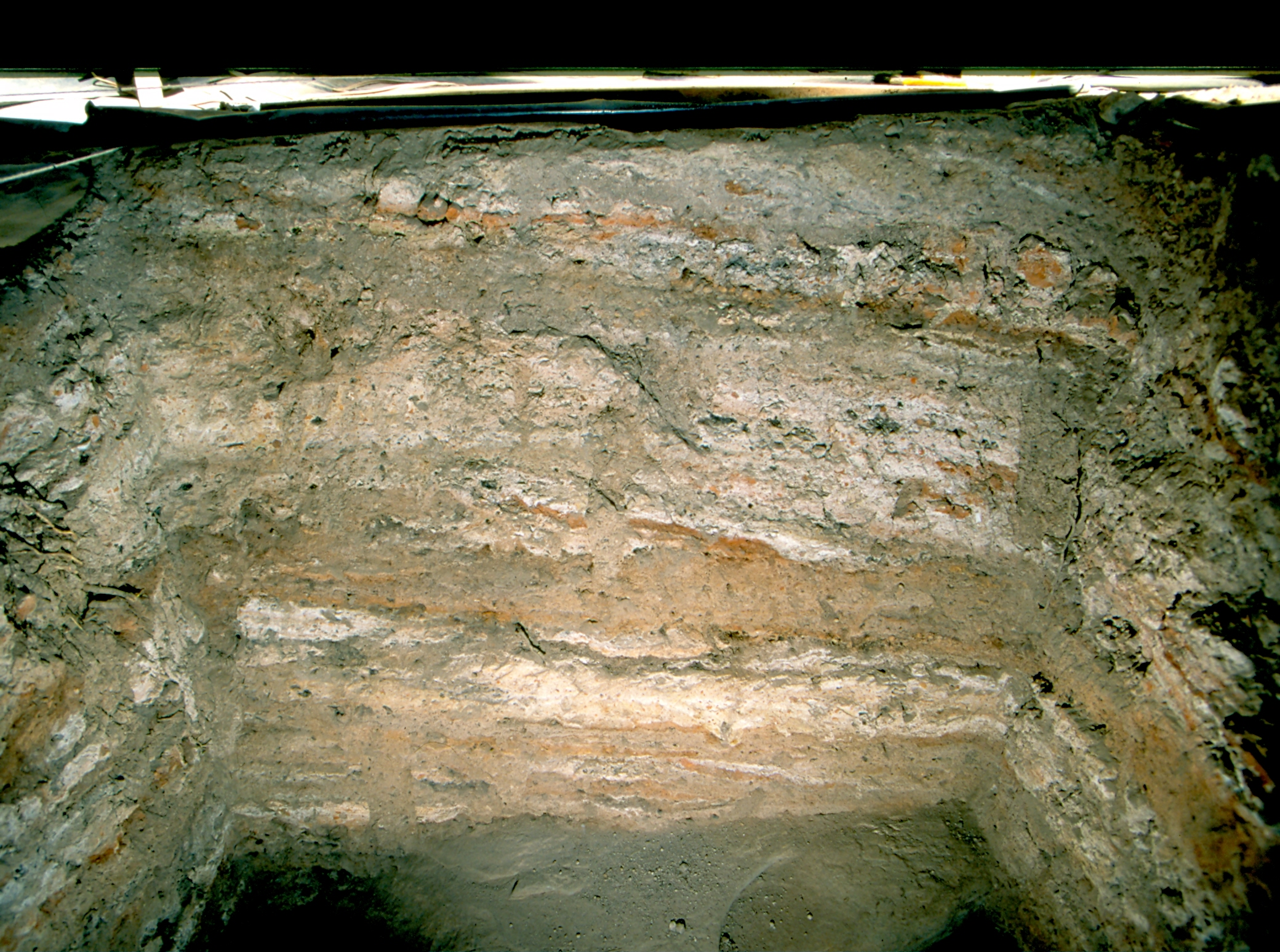

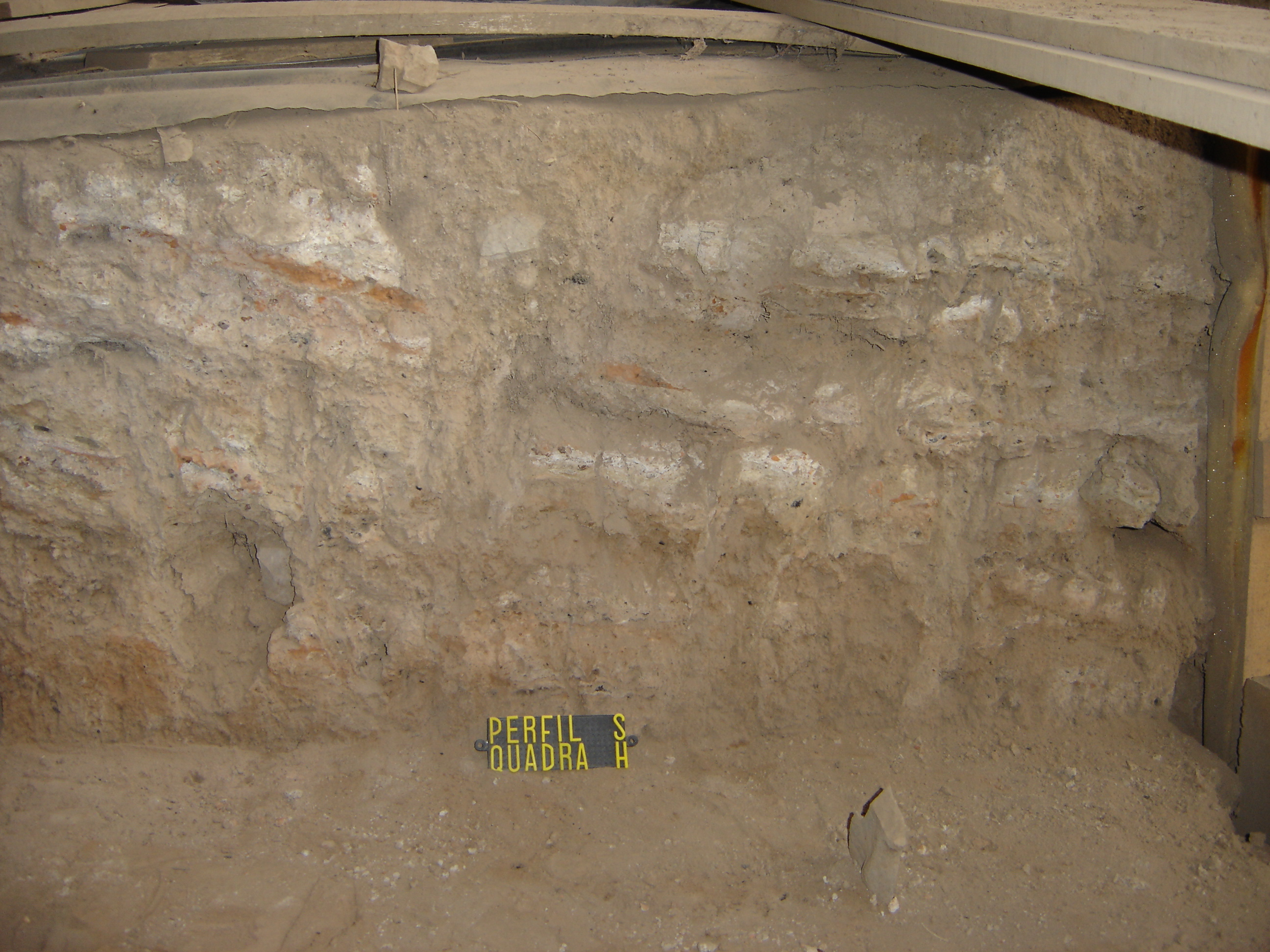

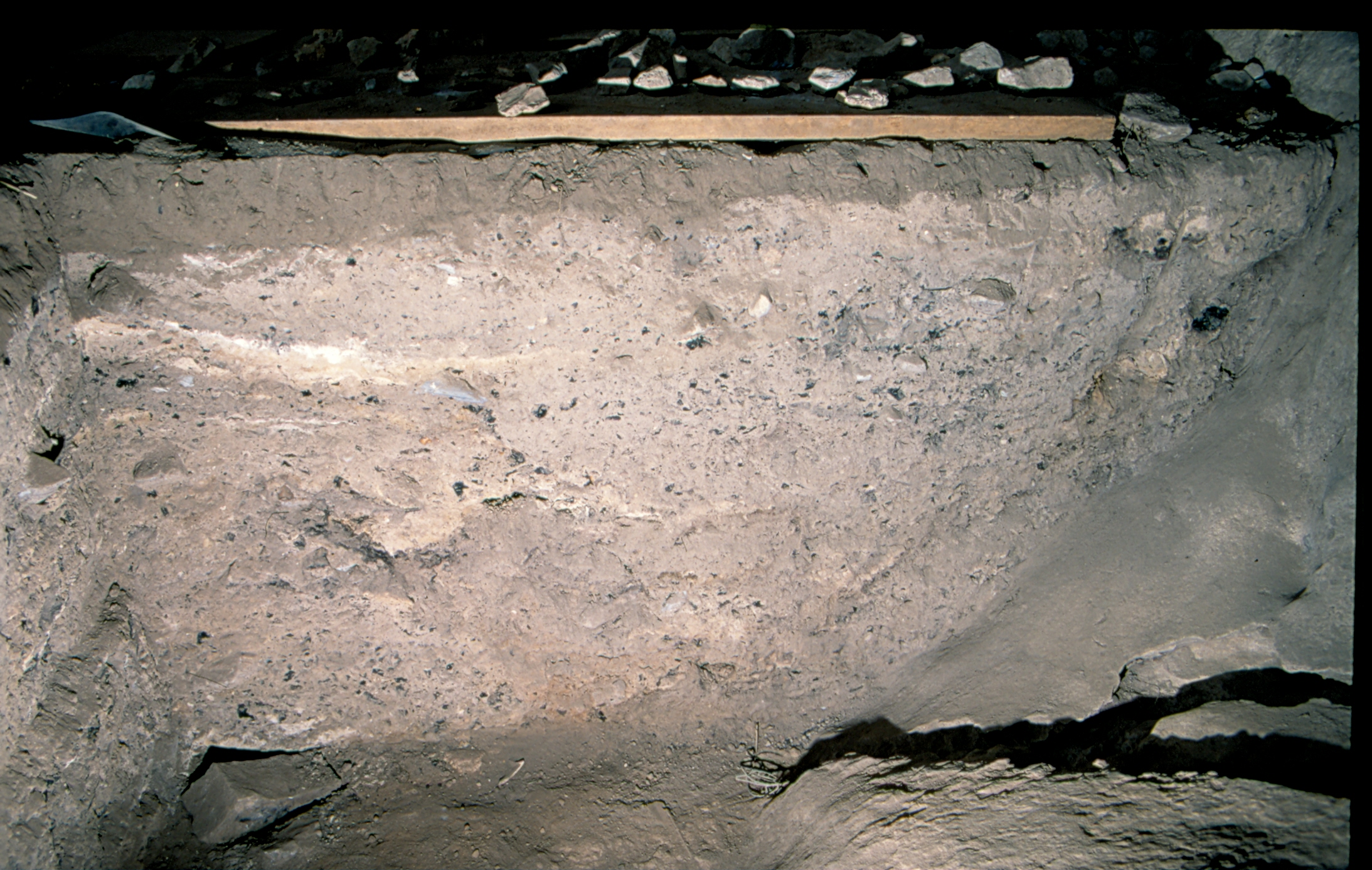

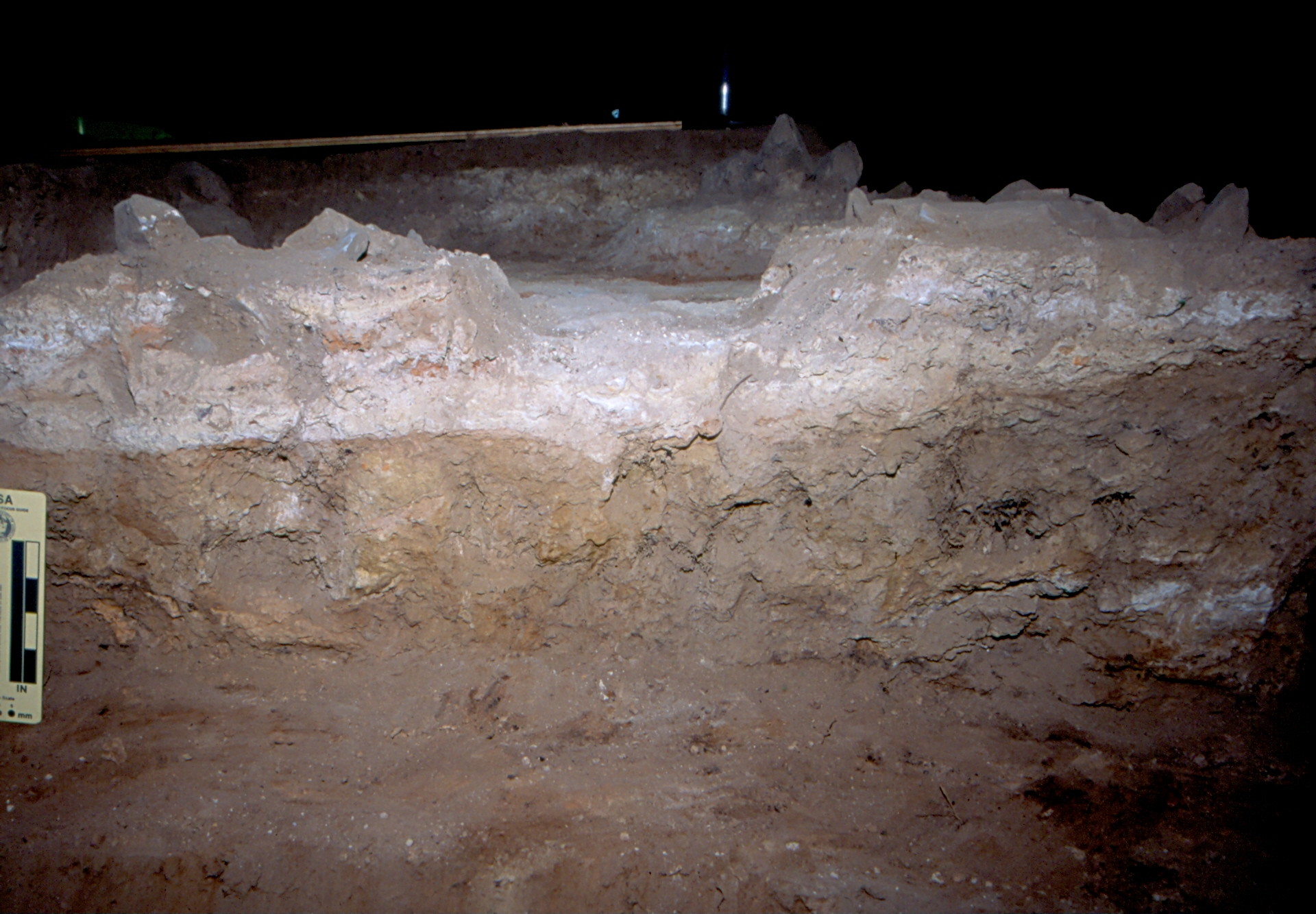

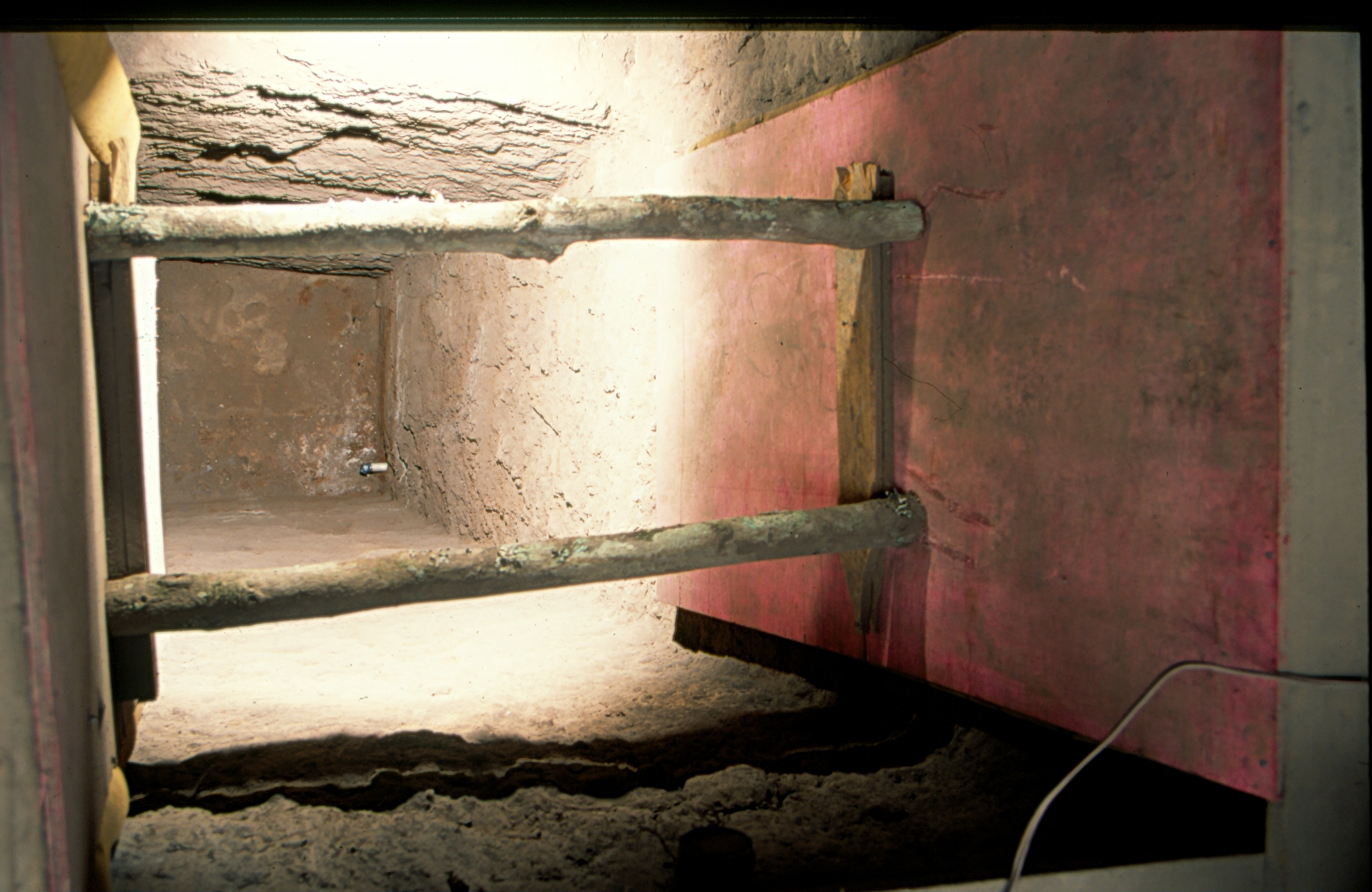
The early Holocene anthropogenic deposits is ca. 4 meters depth.
Lapa do Santo - Micromorphology

Micromorphological thin-sections from Lapa do Santo (2001–2009)

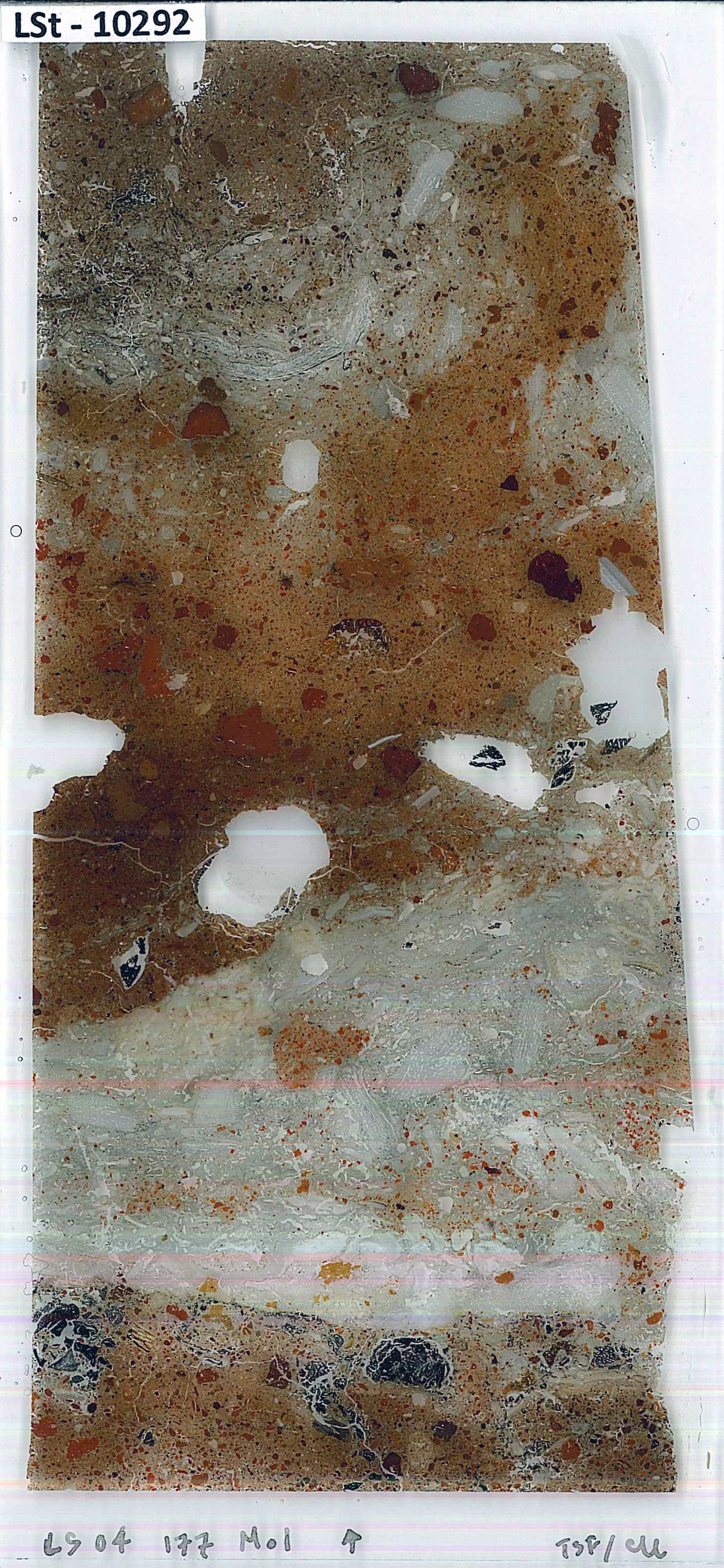
Micromorphological thin-section Lst-10292. Combustion structure.

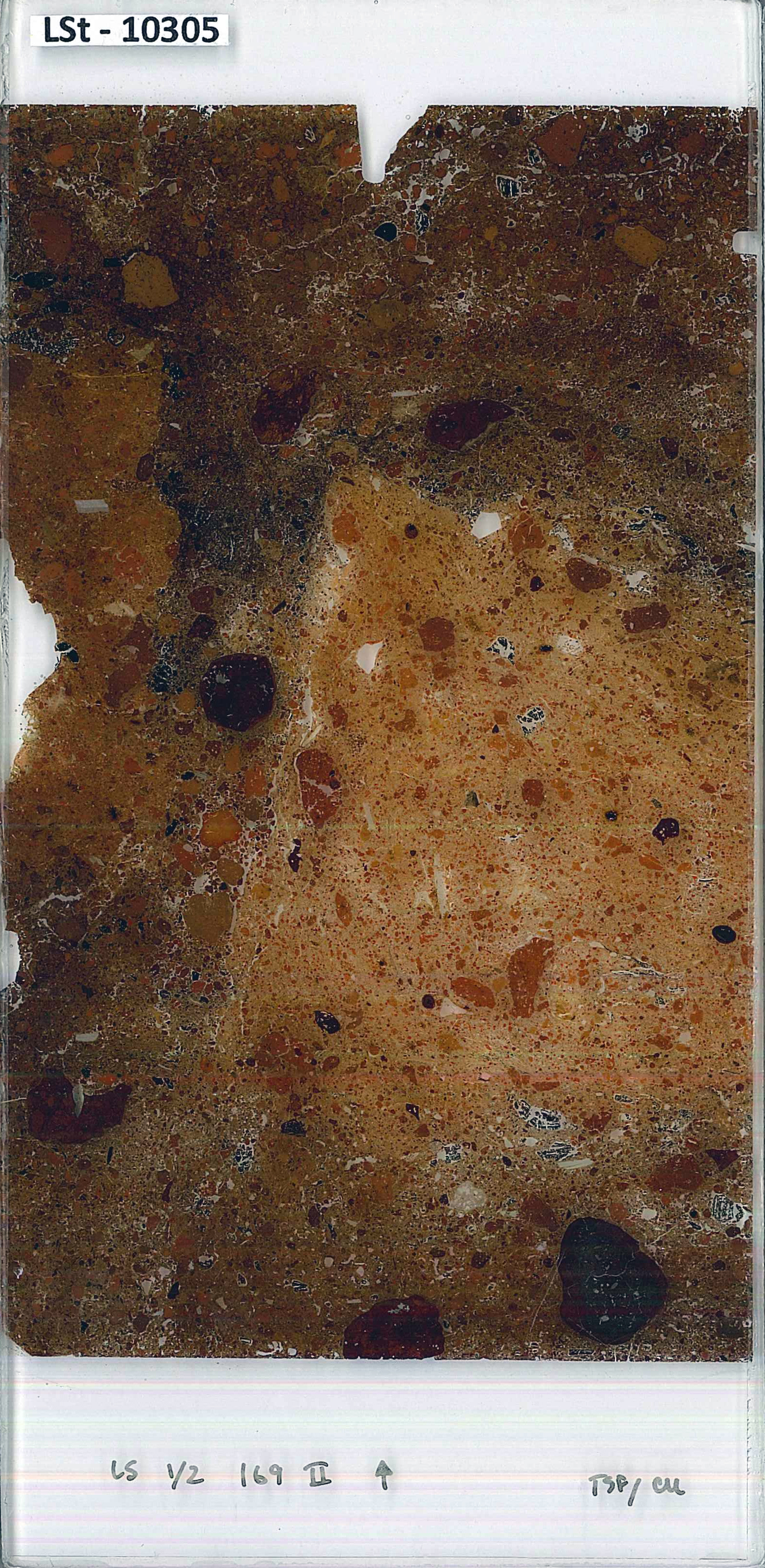
Micromorphological thin-section Lst-10305.

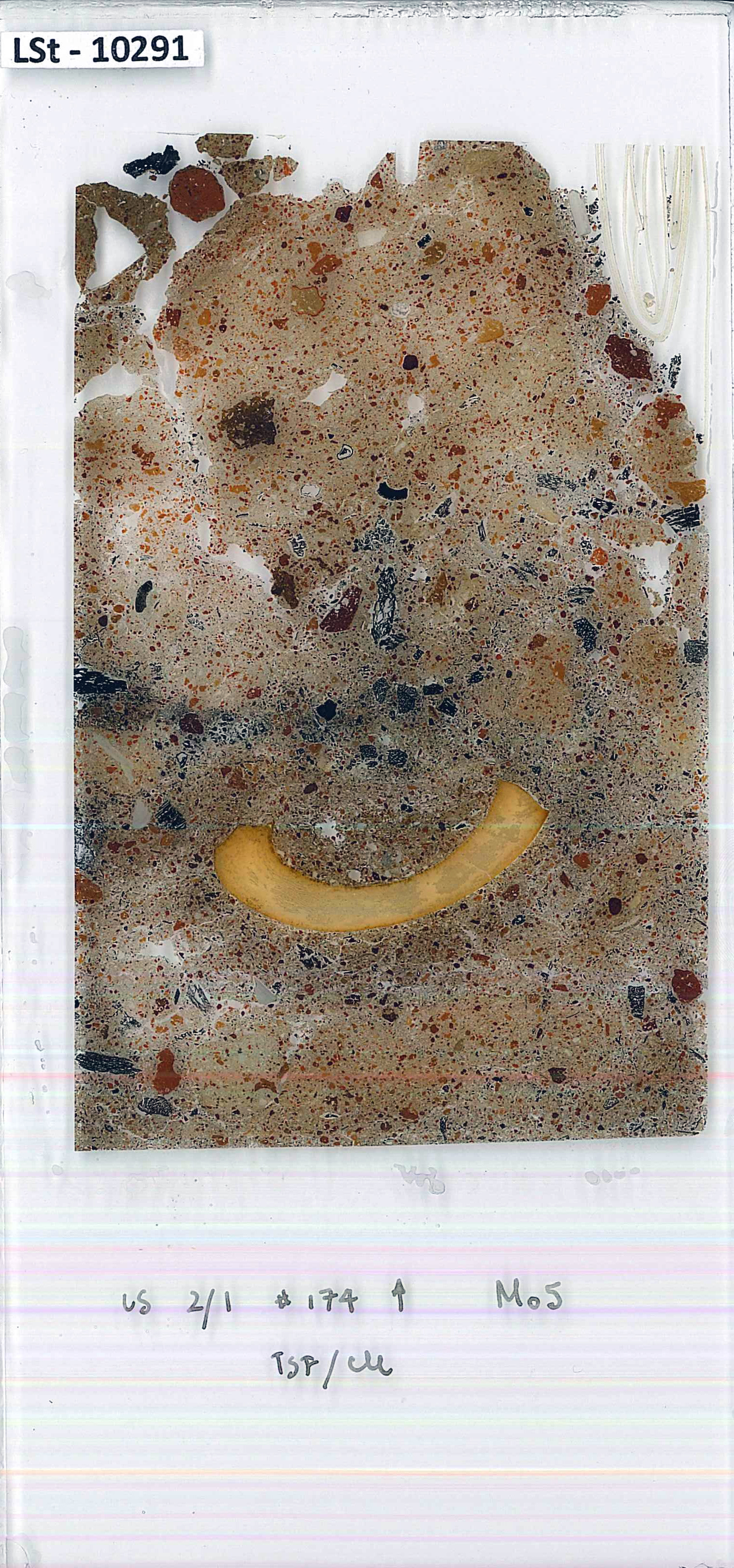
Micromorphological thin-section Lst-10291.

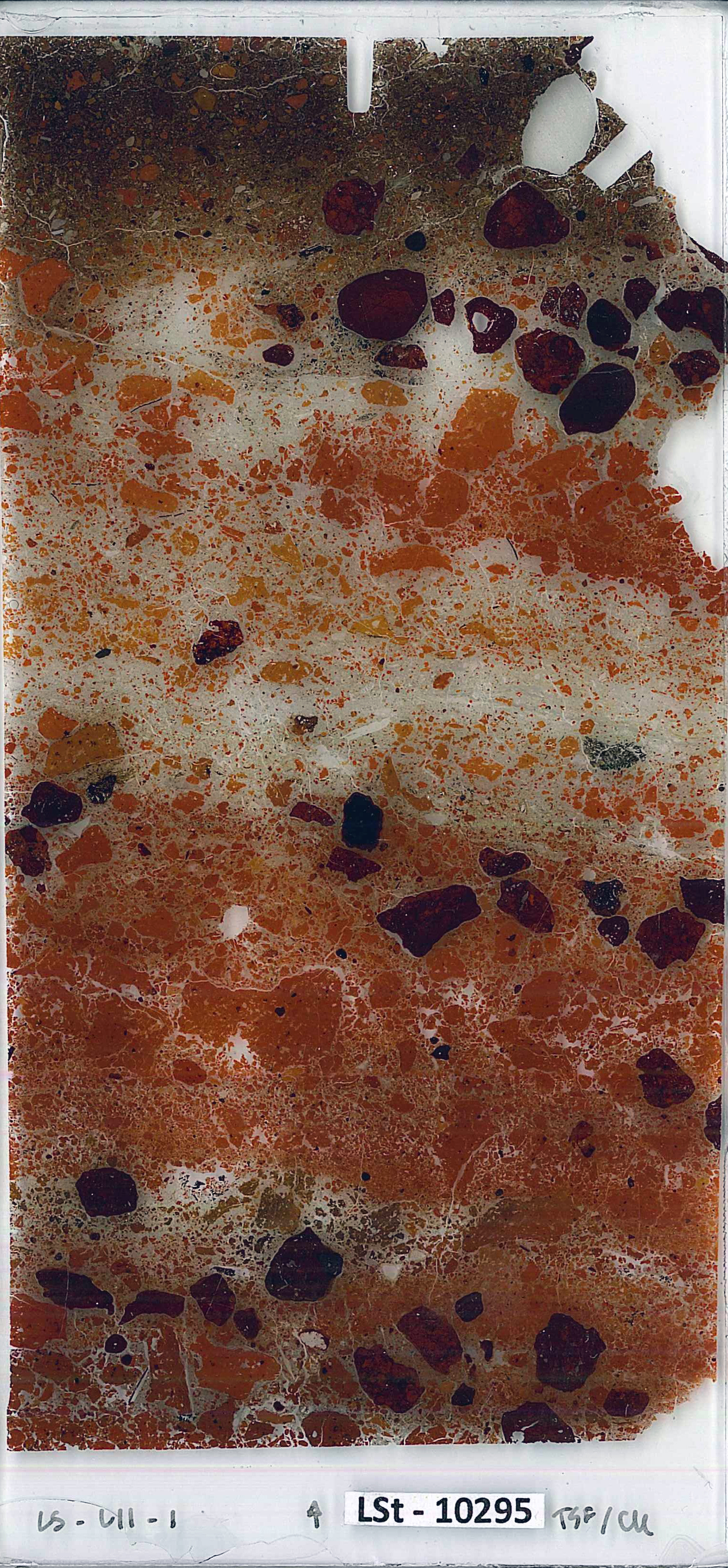
Micromorphological thin-section Lst-10295.

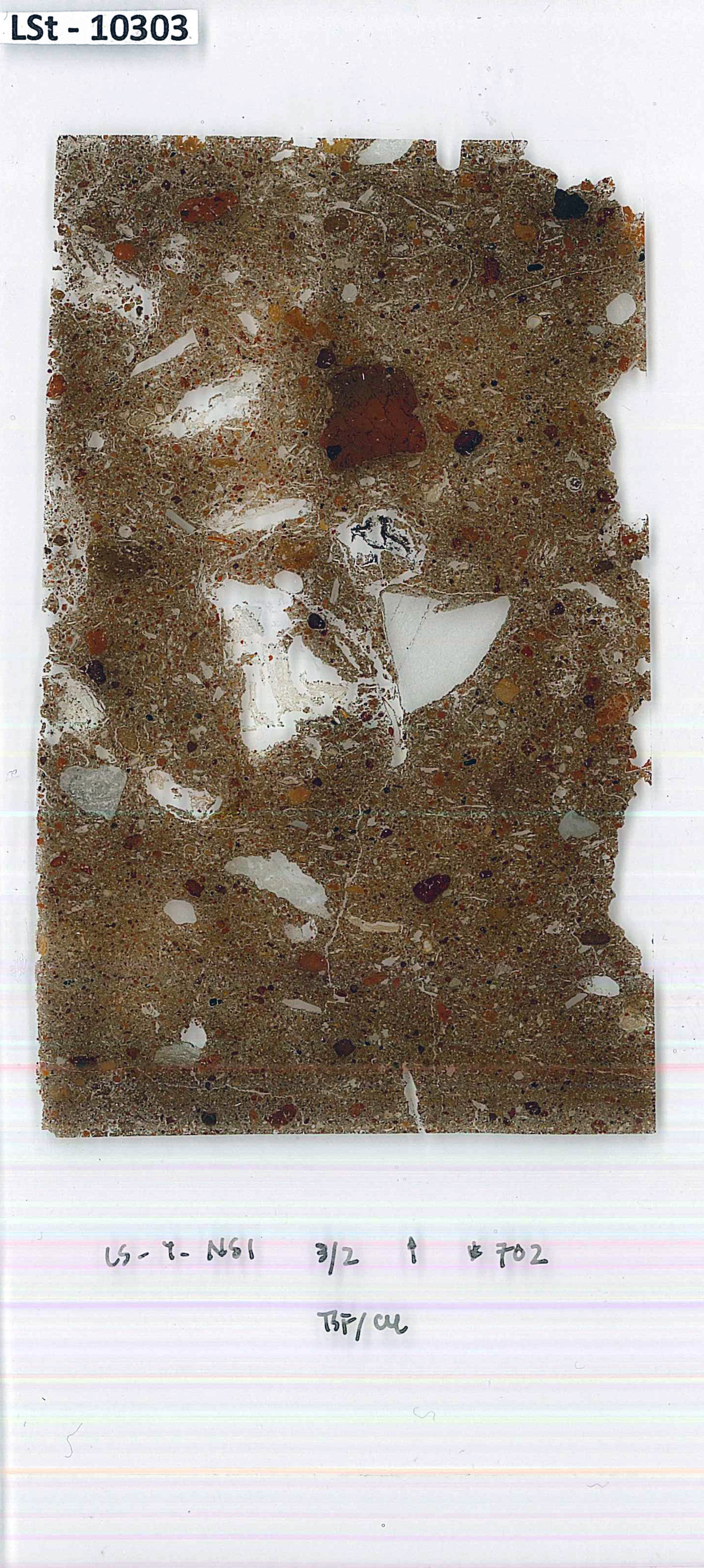
Micromorphological thin-section Lst-10303.

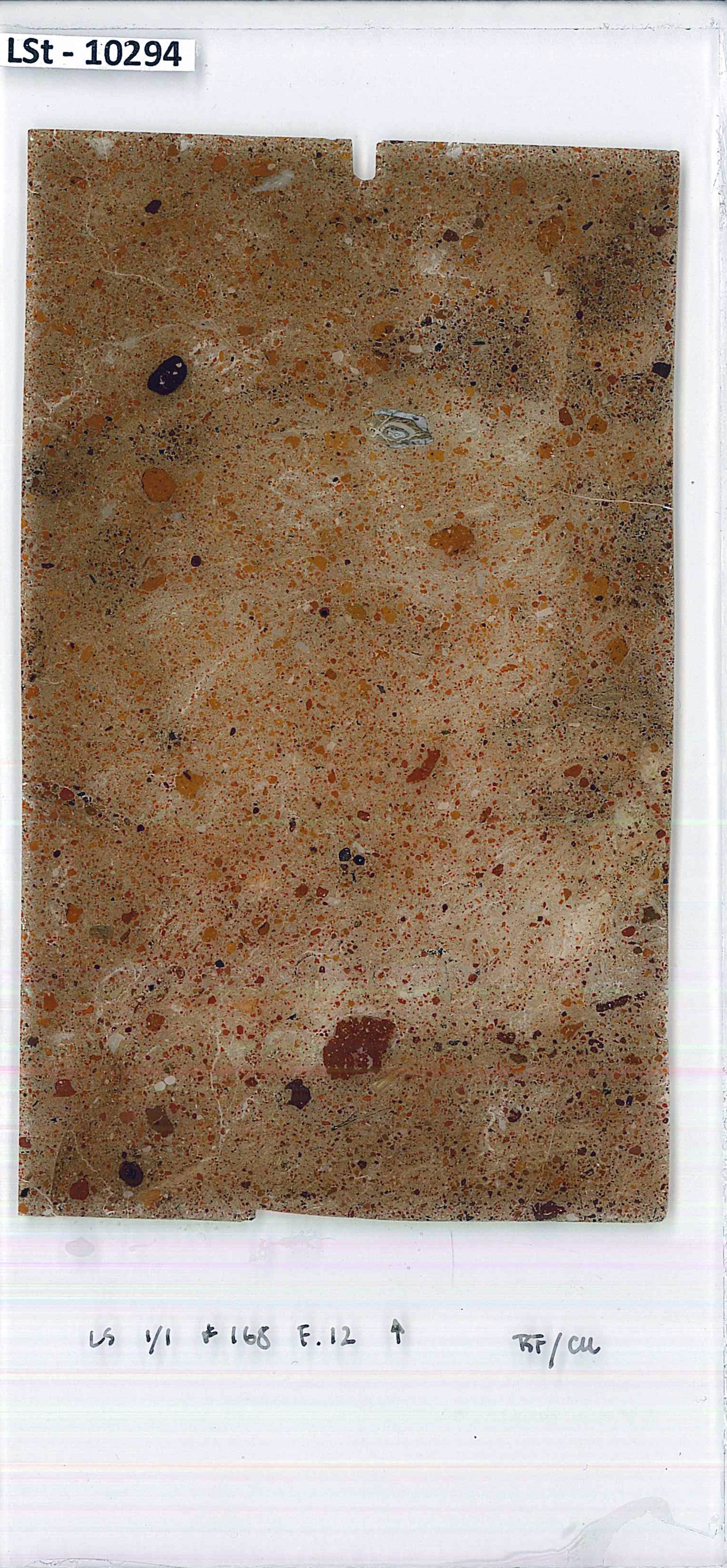
Micromorphological thin-section Lst-10294.

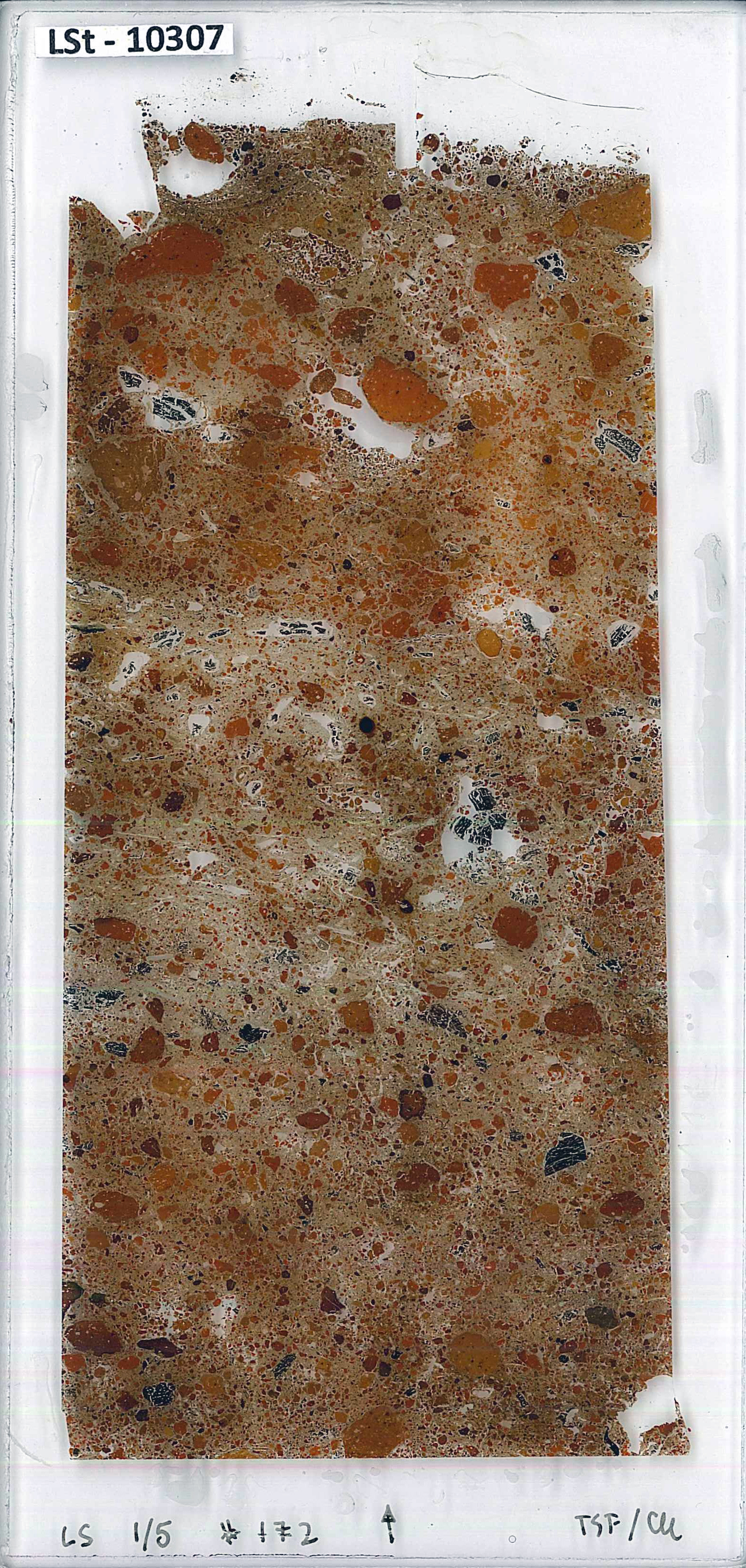
Micromorphological thin-section Lst-10307.

Ct-scan view of undeformed block from Lapa do Santo

== Diet and subsistence ==
Zooarchaeological analysis indicates the presence of fish, lizards, rodents, armadillos, peccaries and deer that were brought as a single piece from the killing site. Results of stable carbon and nitrogen isotopic analysis indicate a diet where protein mainly came from plant food resources. Together with dental caries frequencies comparable to those observed among agricultural populations, the emerging picture is of a typical early Archaic economy structured around staple carbohydrates complemented by hunting of small and mid-sized animals.

=== Zooarchaeology ===
Zooarchaeological analyses are key to better understand the relationship between humans and other animal populations, specifically for studies on diet and hunting strategies. For the faunal analyses at Lapa do Santo A standard zooarchaeological methodology was adopted. The Number of Identified Specimens (NISP) and Minimum Number of Individuals (MNI) was computed for a sample of faunal assemblage coming from units: L7, L8, L10, M3, M4, M5, M6, and from archaeological strata contemporary to the early Holocene human remains. The results point to a faunal assemblage dominated by small and medium-sized mammals, as well as reptiles, birds and fishes. Bigger mammals, such as deer and peccaries are also present in the faunal assemblage, but not as predominantly as one would expect based on their much higher return rate when compared to medium-sized animals; but in accordance with evolutionary ecology models for prehistoric foraging societies in Central Brazil. The fact that almost all the anatomical parts of deer are represented indicates a subsistence/dietary strategy that is not targeting specific body parts when analyzed against Food Utility Index (FUI). The game was not dismembered in the killing site, but brought as entire piece to the dwelling camp.

=== Carbon and nitrogen stable isotopes ===
Carbon and nitrogen stable isotope analysis on bone collagen is widely used in archaeology for reconstructing ancient diets. A total of 17 human bones and 51 faunal bones from the early Holocene deposits of Lapa do Santo were analysed with this technique. Due to poor preservation conditions only eight human from Lapa do Santo and 22 faunal samples from Lagoa Santa provided collagen with an acceptable C:N ratio between 2.9 and 3.6. The material was analyzedin three different laboratories: the Dorothy Garrod Laboratory for Isotopic Analysis of the McDonald Institute for Archaeological Research, University of Cambridge (UC); the Laboratório de Ecologia Isotópica (Isotope Ecology Lab) at the Escola Superior de Agricultura Luis de Queirós, University of São Paulo (ESALQ-USP); and the isotope facilities at the Max-Planck Institute for Evolutionary Anthropology (MPI-EVA).

Results for the fauna are mostly consistent with their dietary habits. Deer (Mazama sp.;Cervidae, Goldfuss 1820) are browsing animals, and in the savannas of central Brazil normally feed on more ^{13}C-depleted gallery forest plants. Their predominantly C_{3} plant based diet is compatible with the observed collagen isotope values of d^{13}C -20.7±1.6‰ and d^{15}N 6.0±1.9 ‰ (1 sigma interval, n=10). Tayassuidae (Palmer 1897) have generalist omnivore diets. The total of 6 analyzed collagen samples of this animal clustered into two groups of three samples each. One group has a typical C_{3} type herbivore diet, very similar to that found in deer, averaging d^{13}C -22.5±1.0‰ and d^{15}N 4.7±0.5‰; whilst the other group has a more carnivore-like diet, averaging d^{13}C -16.5±1.0‰ and d^{15}N 9.7±0.3‰. This difference could be due to a number of reasons such as their broad alimentary range, inter-species variation, environmental changes, or the small sample size. Both armadillo species, Dasypus novencinctusand Euphractus sexcinctus (Dasypodidae, Gray 1821) are omnivores with a tendency to carnivory. Both species have collagen isotope values compatible with a carnivorous behavior averaging d^{13}C -14.9±1.7‰, d^{15}N 8.2±0.5‰ (n=3) and d^{13}C -18.4‰, d^{15}N 8.2‰ (n=2), respectively.

The human results are invariant in their d^{13}C values, displaying a mean of d^{13}C -19.0±0.6‰ and, therefore, indicating a predominately C_{3} based diet. The d^{15}N values range from 5.3 to 11.3‰. The most enriched d^{15}N value comes from an infant with non-erupted permanent dentition and probably reflects breastfeeding. Sub-adults with erupted permanent deciduous already have d^{15}N values more similar to adults. The low d^{15}N values in the adult population is distinct from the carnivores (t=4.50; p=0.001) and similar to the herbivores from Lagoa Santa region (t=0.25; p=0.400), suggesting a diet based on plants and supplemented by fauna. This is consistent with zooarchaeological studies from central Brazil pointing to a generalist diet mostly based on the gathering of plants but supplemented by small game.

=== Dental pathologies ===
Dental pathologies are used as a dietary proxy in bioarchaeological studies. As expected for generalist foragers living in a tropical environment, the elevated frequency of dental abscesses and caries has been reported for early Holocene Lagoa Santa, particularly among females. In an environment with a wide variety of tubers and fruits such as pequi (Caryocar brasiliense), jatobá (Hymenaea sp.) and araticum (Annona crassiflora), it is expected that humans would have had a diverse diet instead of focusing exclusively on meat.

=== Mobility ===
Human enamel strontium isotopic values that are close to the range of the local bioavailable signature are consistent with a subsistence strategy based on immediately available local resources. Low levels of mobility are also supported by previous studies of the femur's midshaft morphology. The abandonment of allochthonous raw material for lithic production after 9.9 cal kyBP could indicate the moment when this less mobile mode of life began.

=== Hand use ===
Lapa do Santo - Bones of the hand

The trabecular structure of Lapa do Santo hand bones was compared to a large series of human and neanderthal populations. Results are consistent with heavy use of the hand for knapping activities and a variable loading during manipulation.

== Technology ==
The lithic assemblage is dominated by small flakes and cores. Crystal quartz was by far the dominant raw material, but silex, quartzite and silicified sandstone were also used. There is no clear division between artifact and debitage, and every flake is a potential tool. With the exception of a single hematite blade and an arrow point, formal artifacts are inexistent. The flakes were discarded when their edge became dull and most of them were used only a few times. Feather scars, occasional scaler and snap fractures were identified by preliminary use-wear analysis of flakes from Lapa do Santo indicating they were used to cut soft materials such as hides, meat, cordage and grasses. While lithic types were constant through time, the use of raw material varied and around 9.9 cal kyBP non-local sources such as silexite were no longer exploited with the locally available crystal quartz becoming dominant. The bone artifacts from Lapa do Santo are very similar to what is observed in other parts of central Brazil during the same timeframe. They contrast sharply with the expedient technological approach adopted for the production of lithic artifacts.

Lapa do Santo - Artifacts

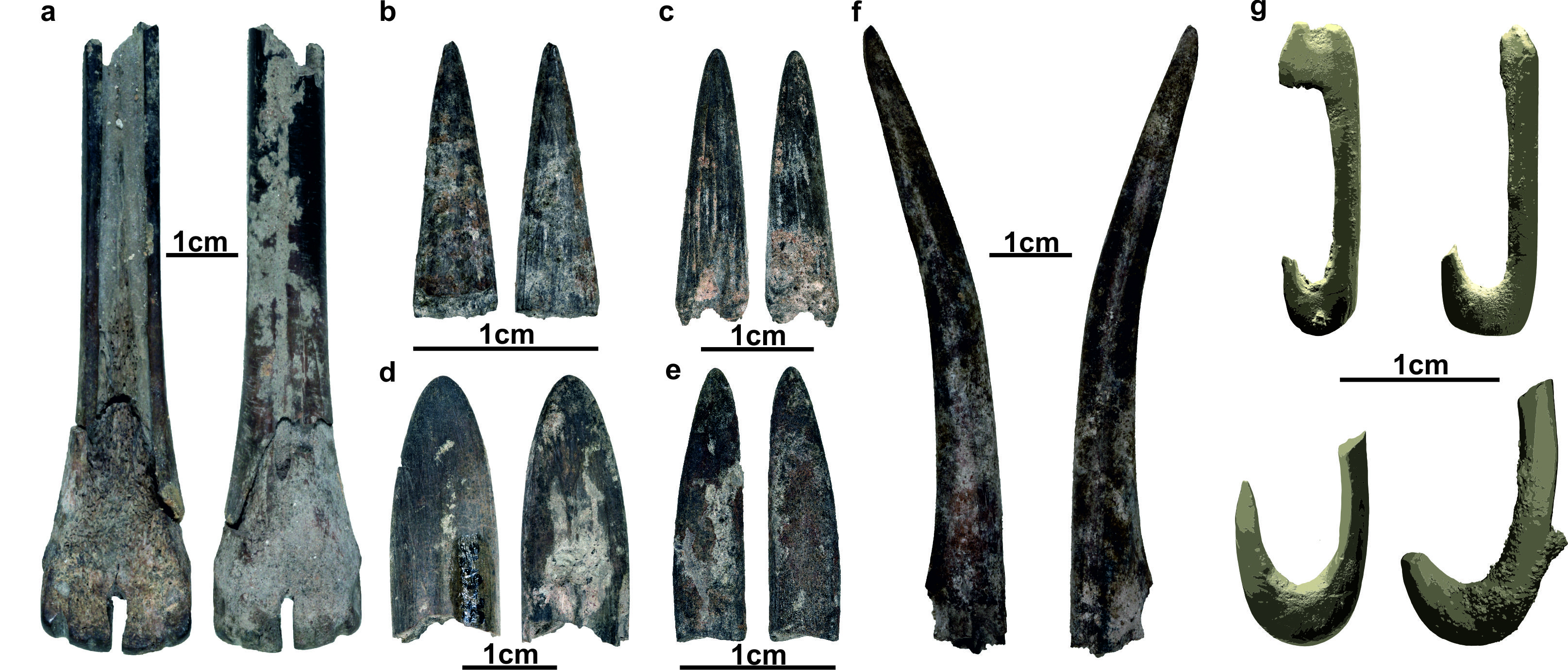
Artifacts produced with bone and antler (early Holocene).

Point found in open air site few miles from Lapa do Santo
Lapa do Santo - Fish hooks

Fish hook #1

Fish hook #2

Fish hook #3

Fish hook #4

Fish hook #5

Fish hook #6

Fish hook #7

== Ancestry, genetics and facial reconstruction ==
Analysis of morphological affinities shows that Lapa do Santo shares a typical Palaeoamerican cranial morphology with other groups of Lagoa Santa region. Lapa Santo can therefore be characterized as a typical Lagoa Santa group. Similar results were obtained with dental metric data. Mitochondrial DNA was extracted from 11 individuals from Lapa do Santo (A2=5, B2=3, C1d1=1, D4h3a=2). The presence of the haplogroup D4h3a disproves previous suggestions that this was related to a coastal expansion. Nuclear DNA was extracted from 7 individuals from Lapa do Santo. Four individuals have the Q1a2a Y-chromosome haplogroup and one individual the C2b Y-chromosome haplogroup. The former and later haplogroups are rare and extremely rare in recent Native Americans, respectively. Haplogroup C2b is so rare that it was proposed to represent a post 6,000 years arrival to the continent - a hypothesis disproved by the data from Lapa do Santo. Lapa do Santo has one individual with the ancestral allele for the EDAR gene showing that the derived allele EDAR V370A - present in 100% of present-day Native Americans and East Asians - was not yet fixed by the early Holocene, implying convergent evolution on both sides of the Pacific. Genomic analysis of ca. 1.2 million SNPs indicates that the individuals from Lapa do Santo were exclusively related with other Native Americans with an important contribution from Clovis related populations.

Lapa do Santo's facial features can be visualized by a forensic reconstruction made by Prof. Caroline Wilkinson based on a virtually retro-deformed 3D model of the cranium of Burial 26.

Lapa do Santo - Crania

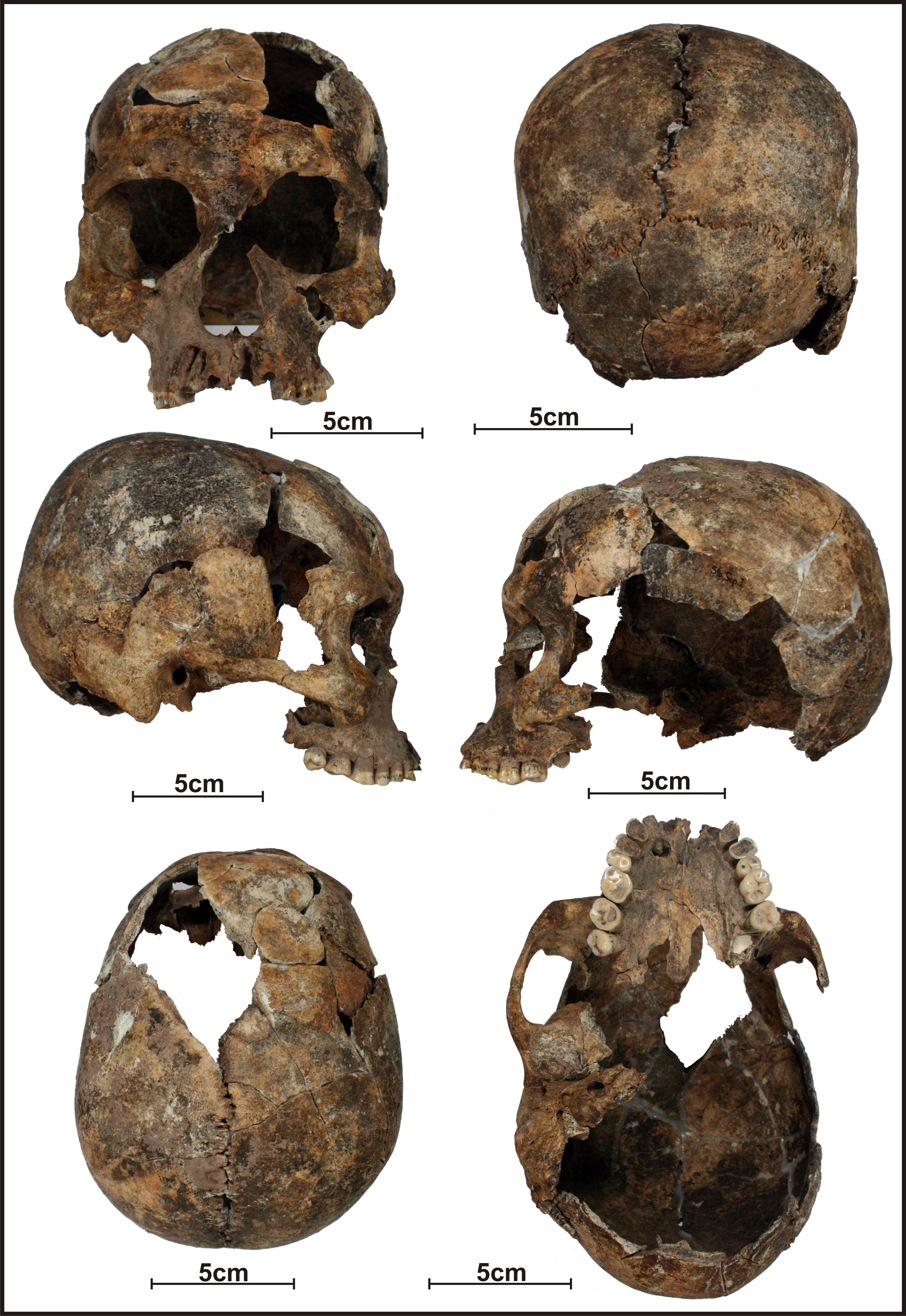
Burial 01 - Cranium

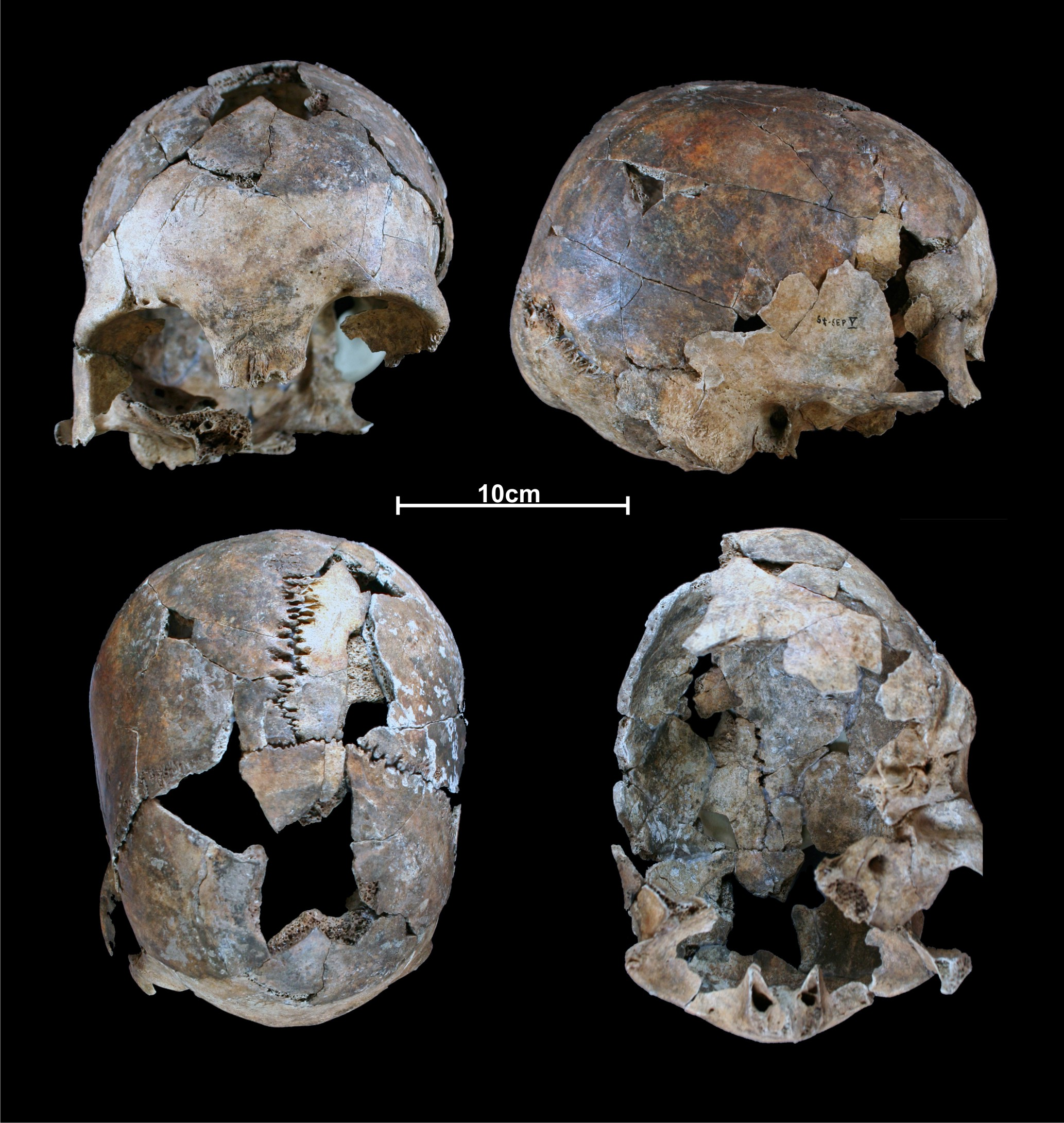
Burial 05 - Cranium

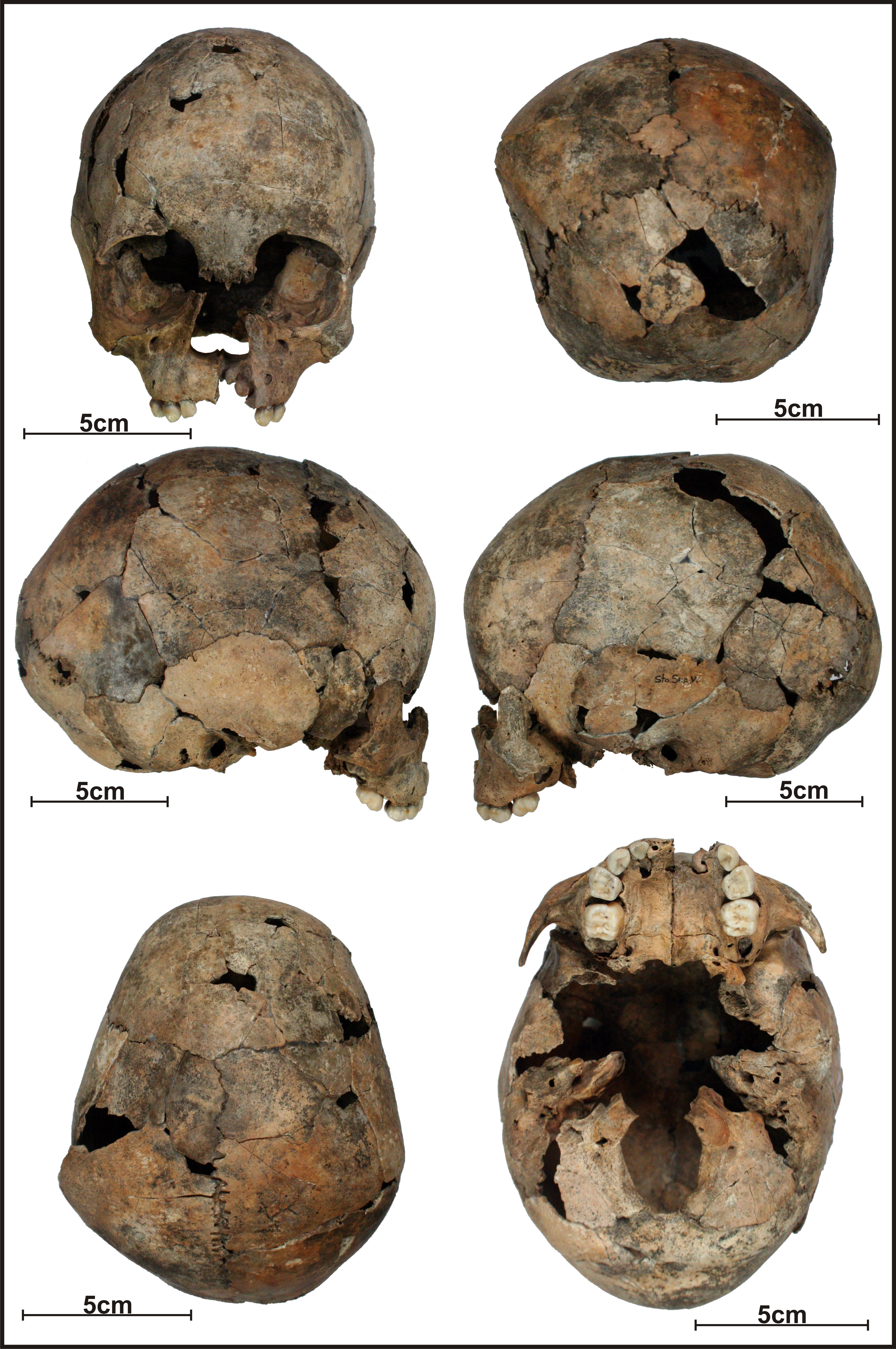
Burial 06 - Cranium

Burial 06 - Cranium 3D

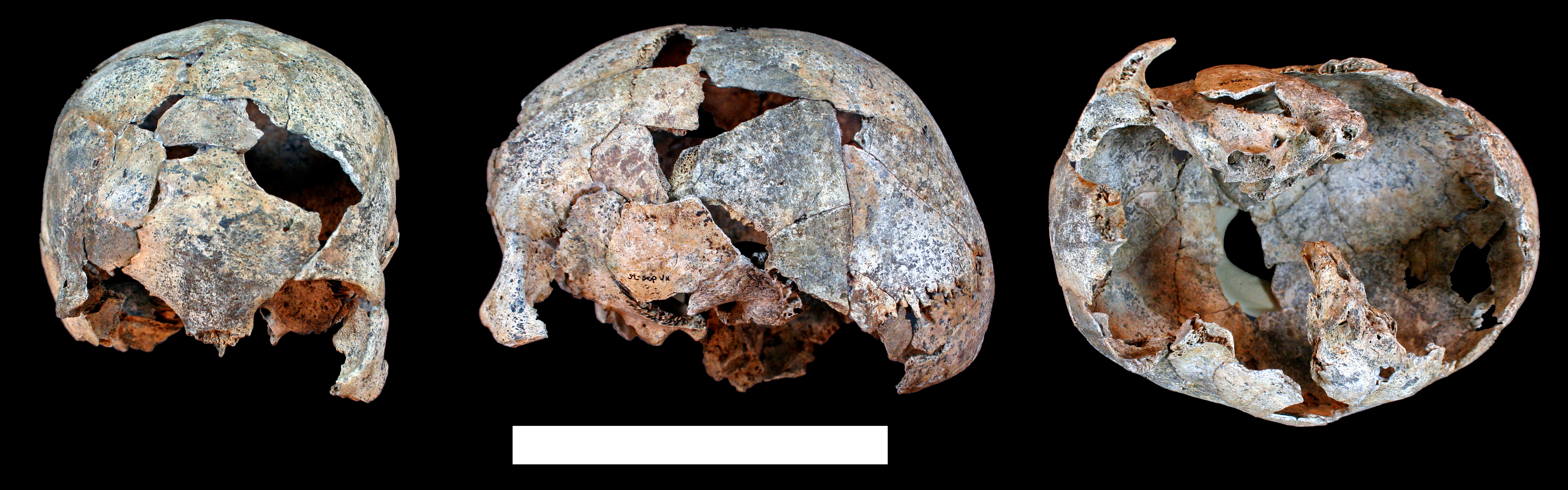
Burial 07 - Cranium

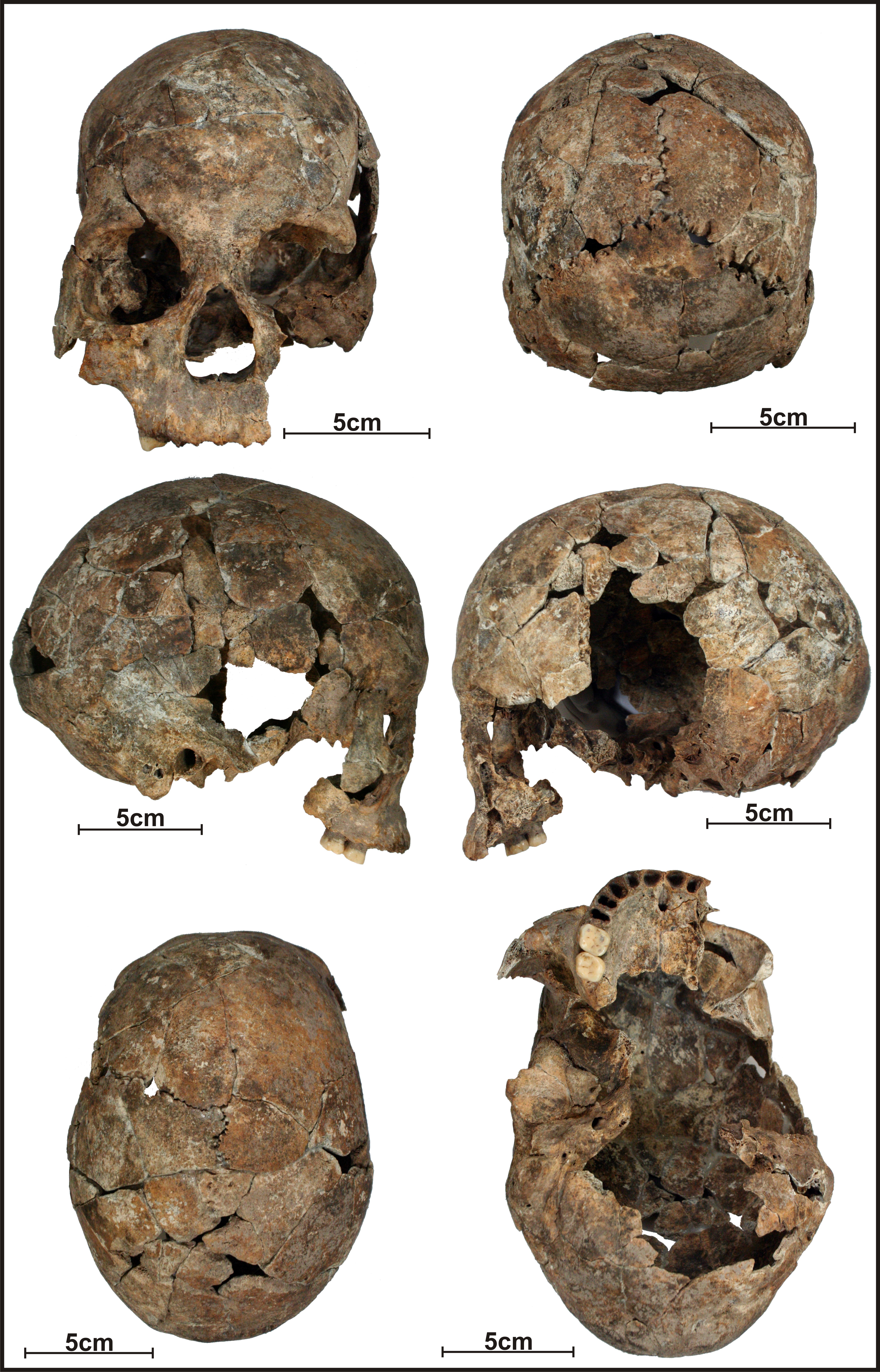
Burial 11 - Cranium

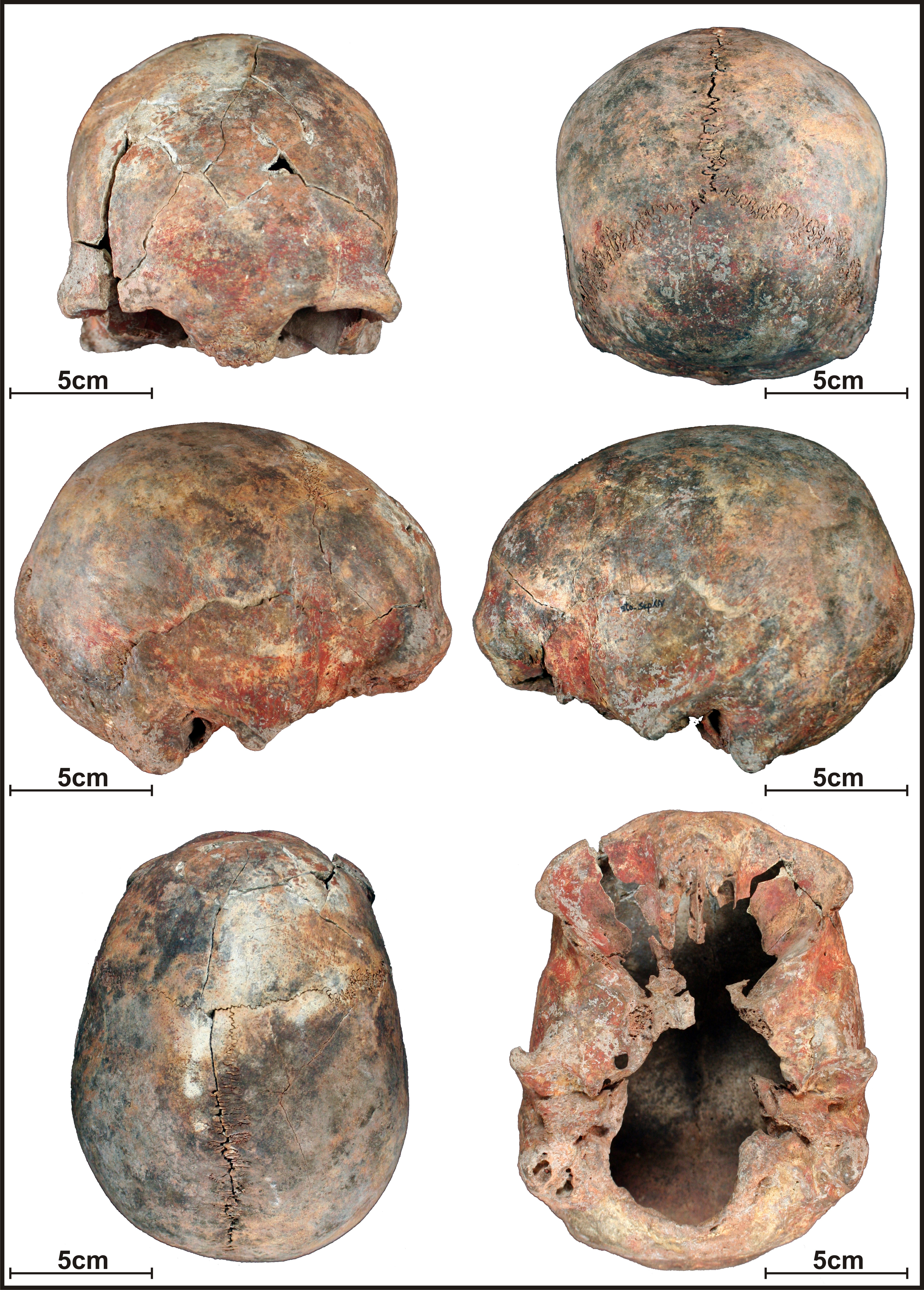
Burial 14 - Cranium

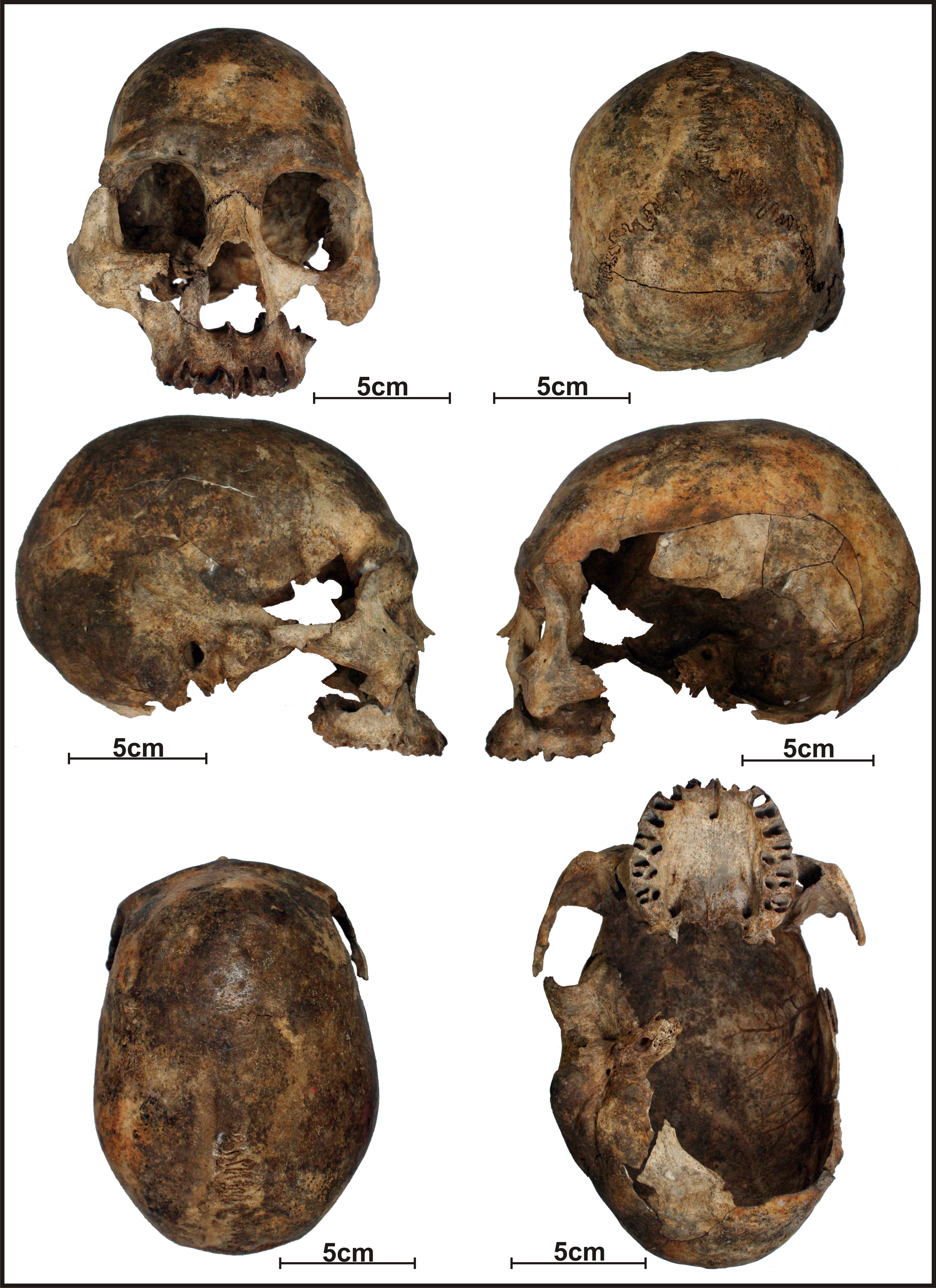
Burial 17 - Cranium

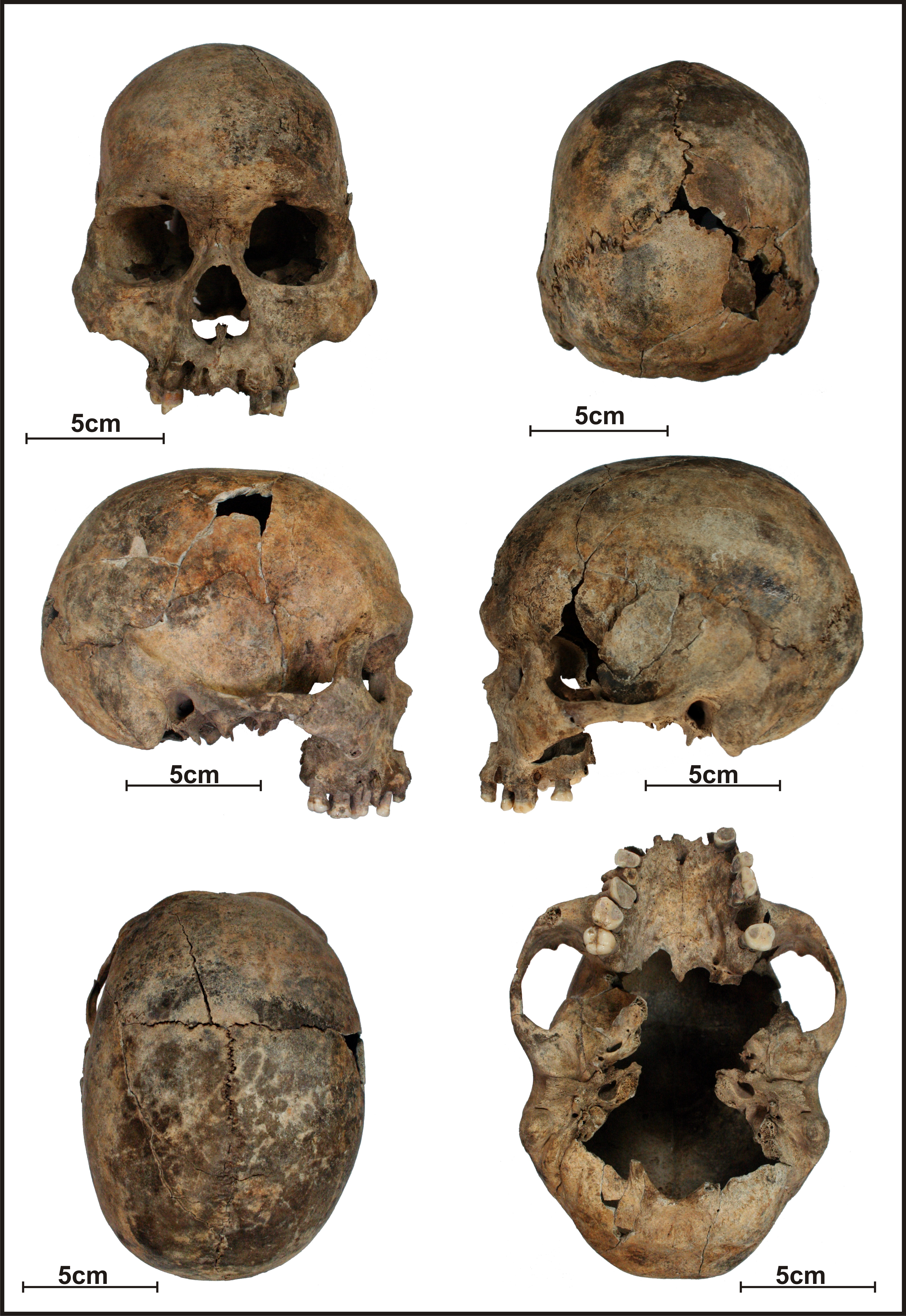
Burial 21 - Cranium

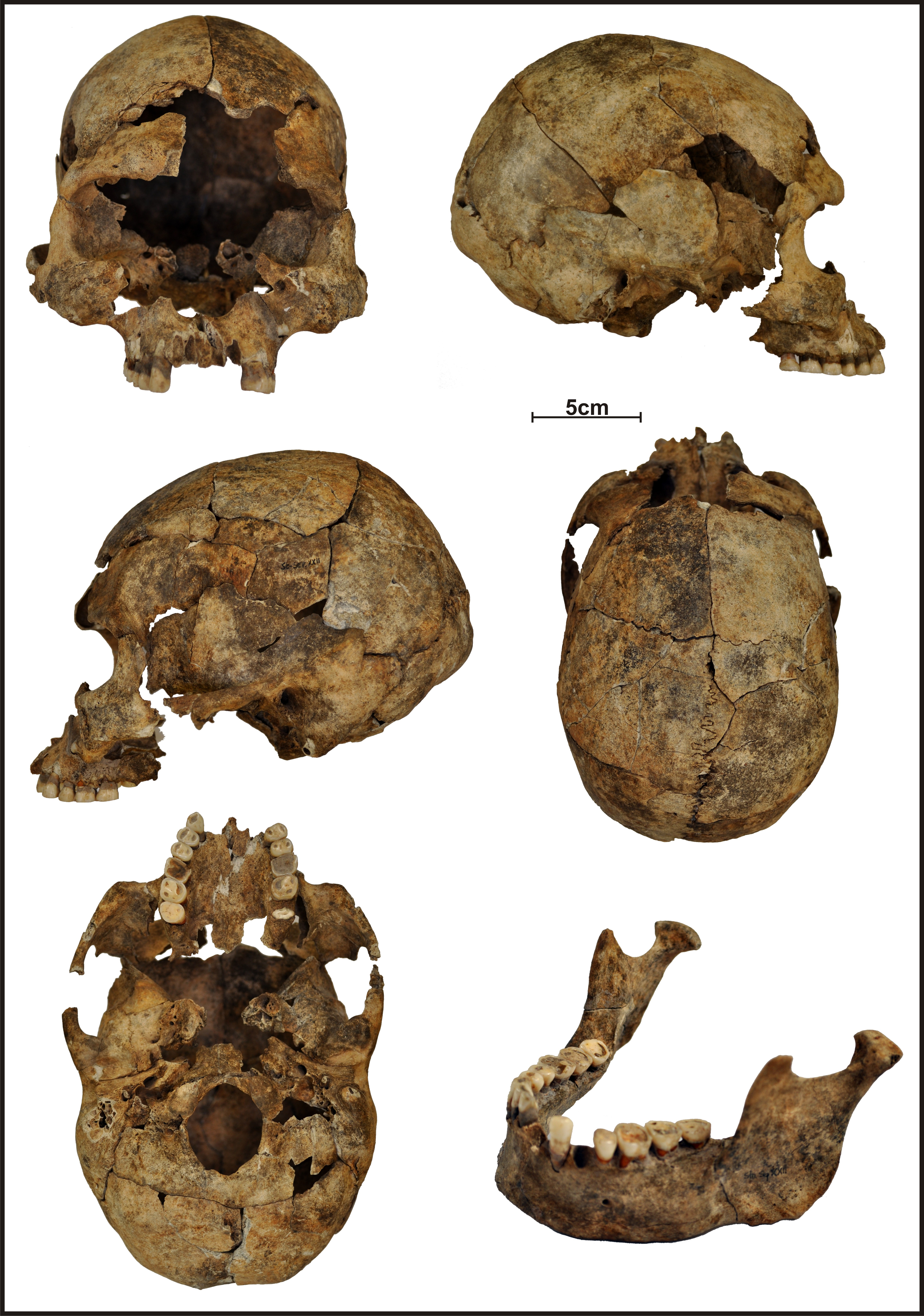
Burial 22 - Cranium and mandible

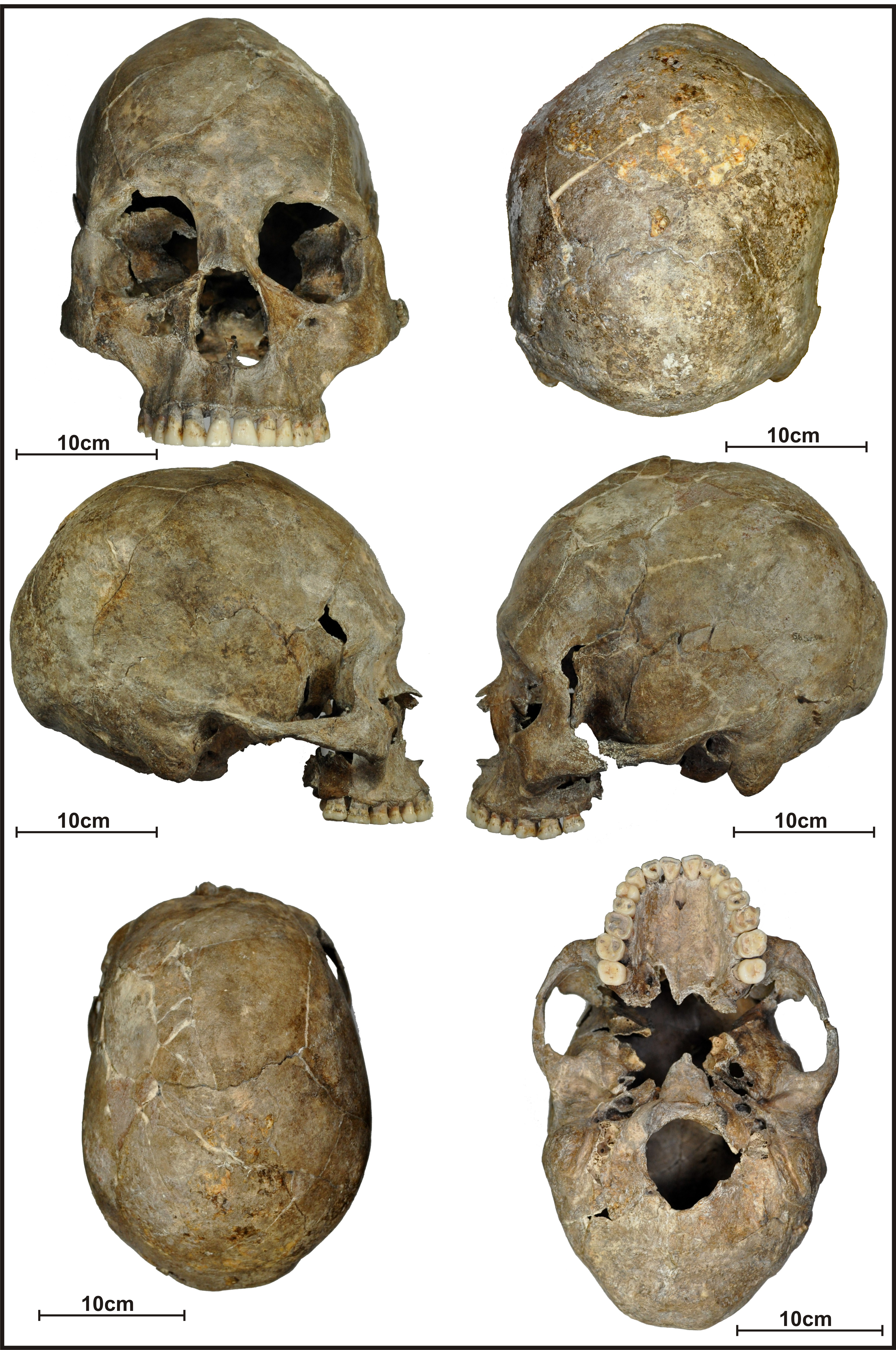
Burial 26 - Cranium

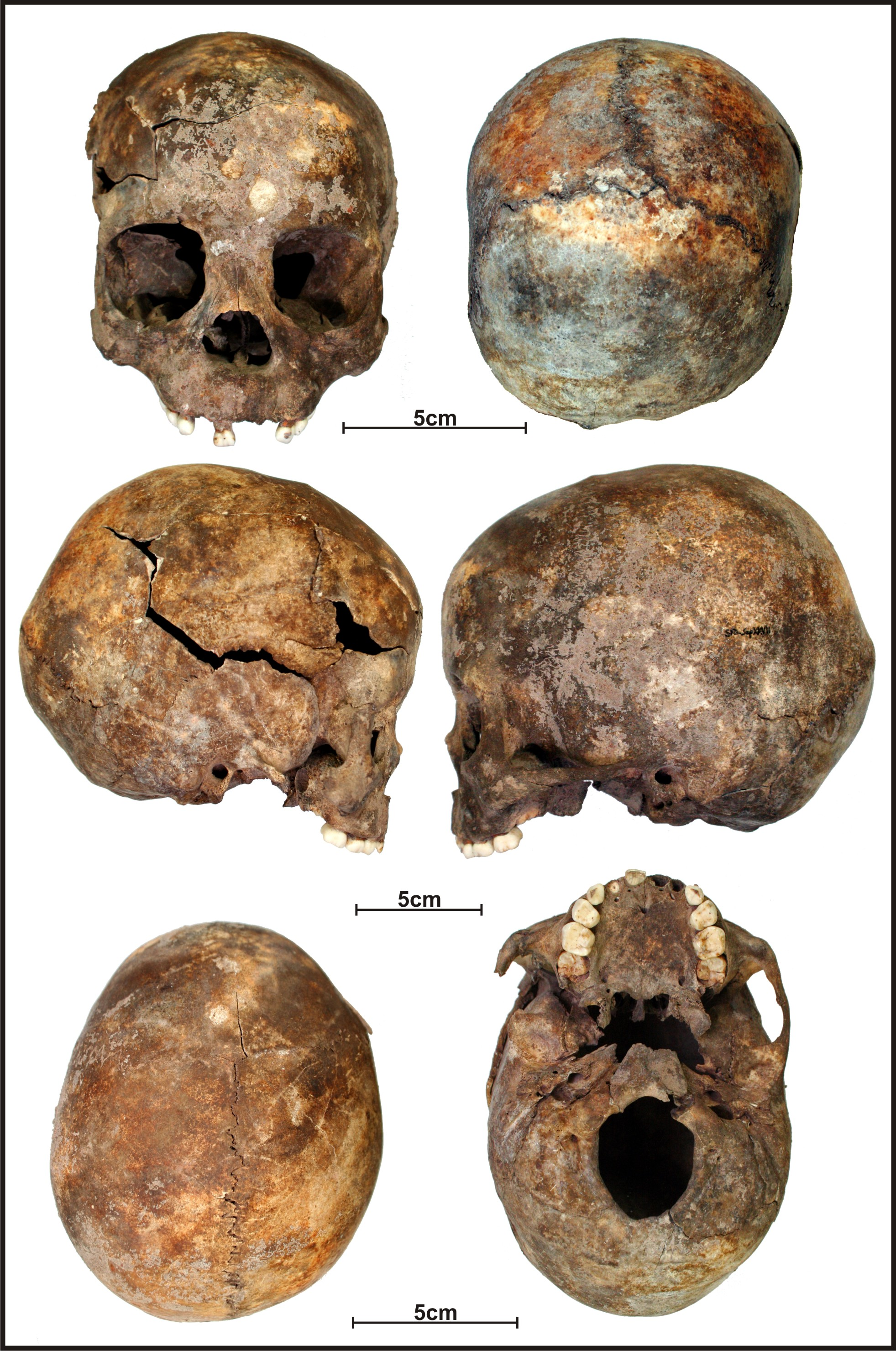
Burial 27 - Cranium

Facial reconstruction in accordance with genetic data

Burial 26 - Facial reconstruction 3D

== Rock art ==
Lapa do Santo is also known for presenting an early Holocene low relief rock art record including a pictorial tradition that depicts phallic imagery and birth scenes suggesting the existence of fertility rituals.

Lapa do Santo - Rock art

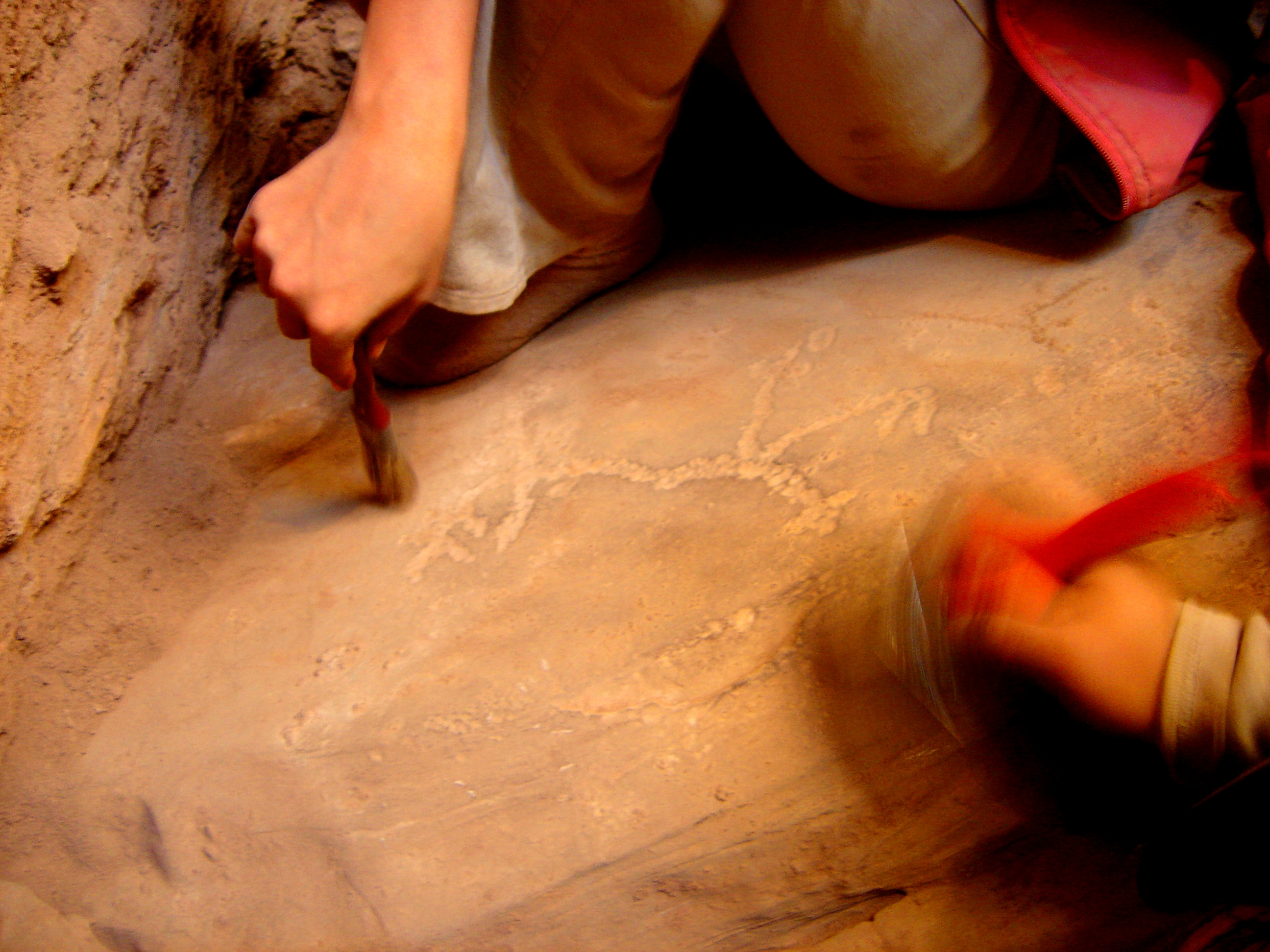

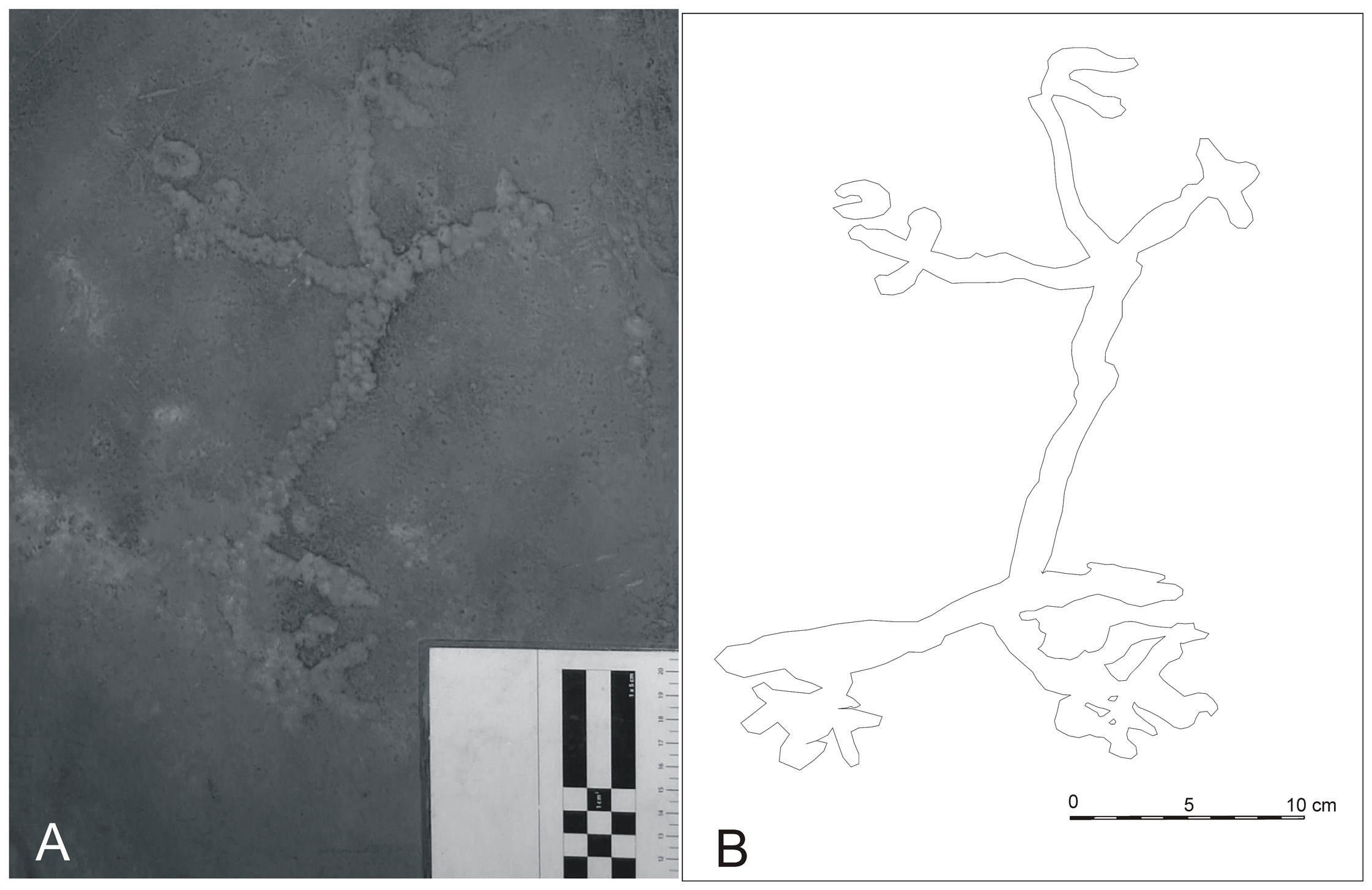
Early Holocene rock art

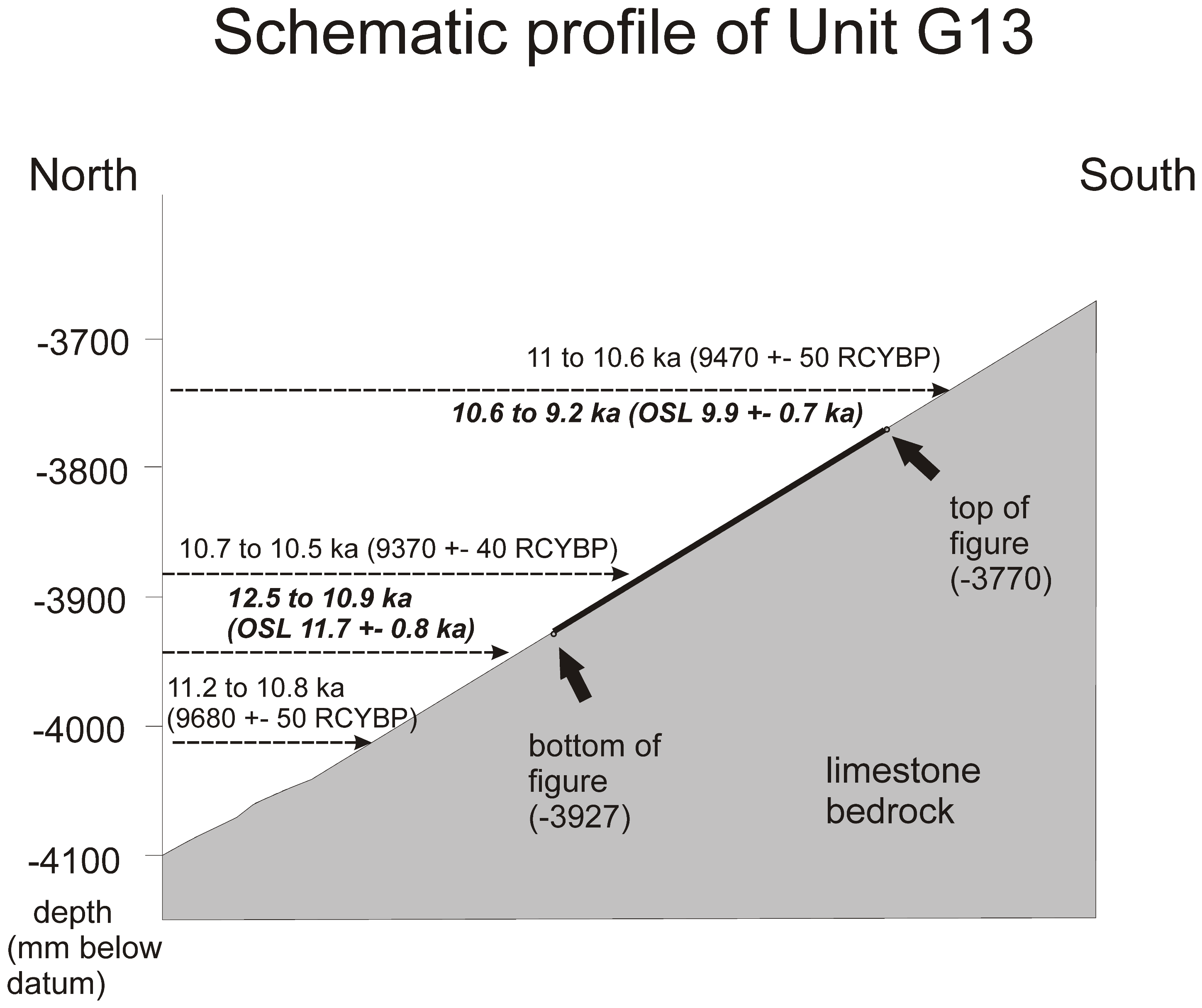
Relative dating of the rock art

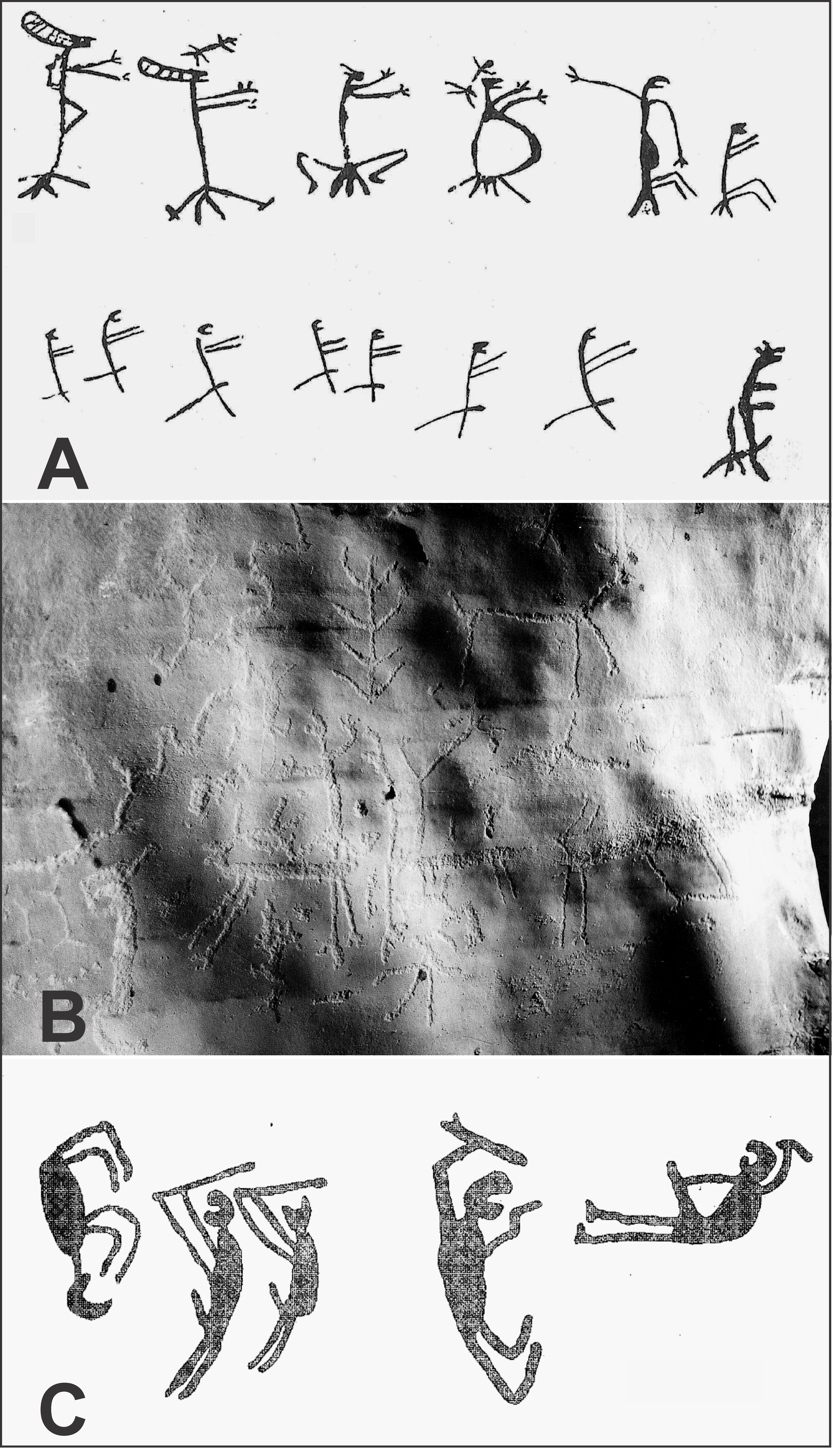
Rock art from other sites from comparison. 'c' is located ca. 1500 km from L.Santo.

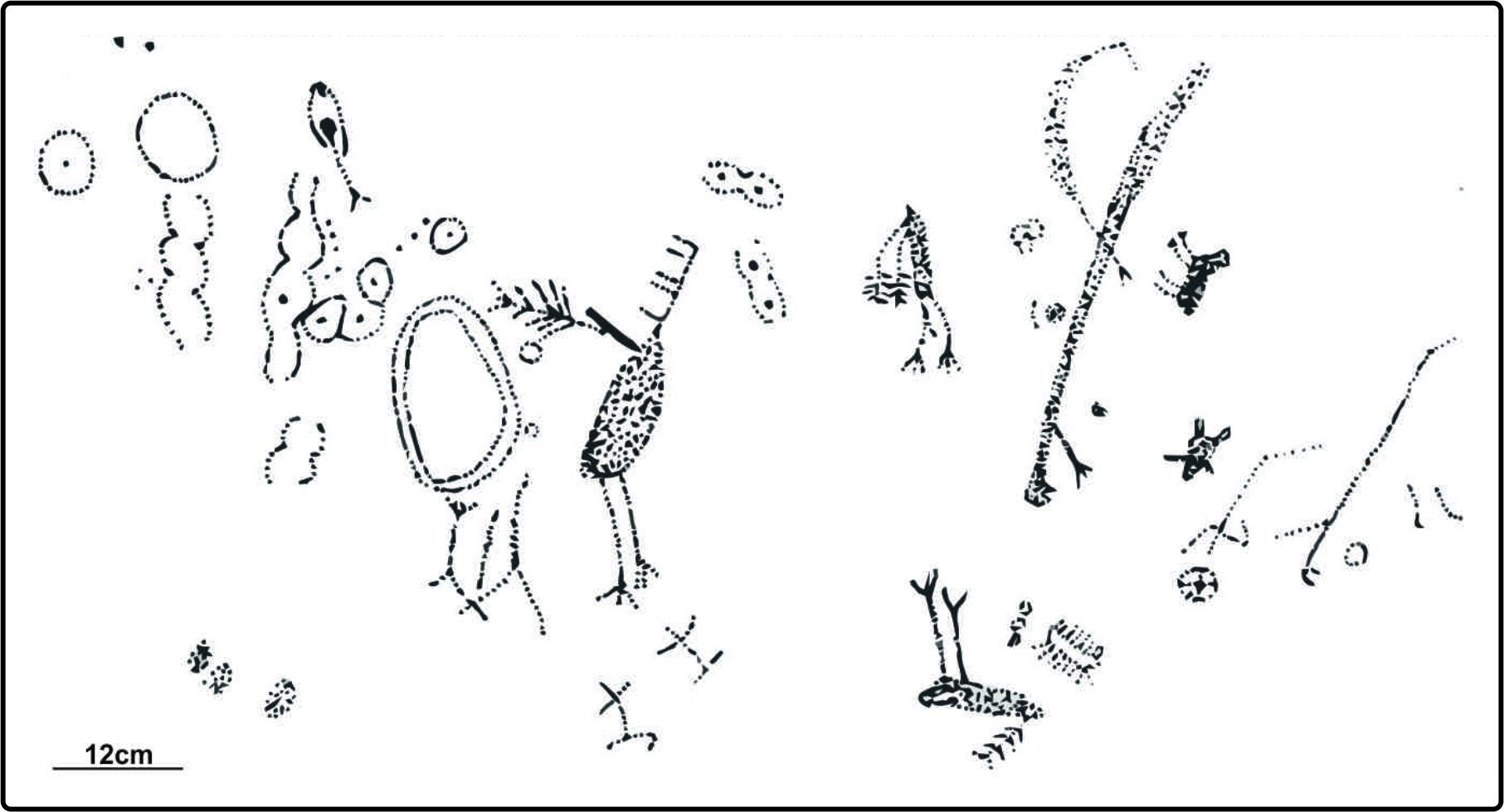

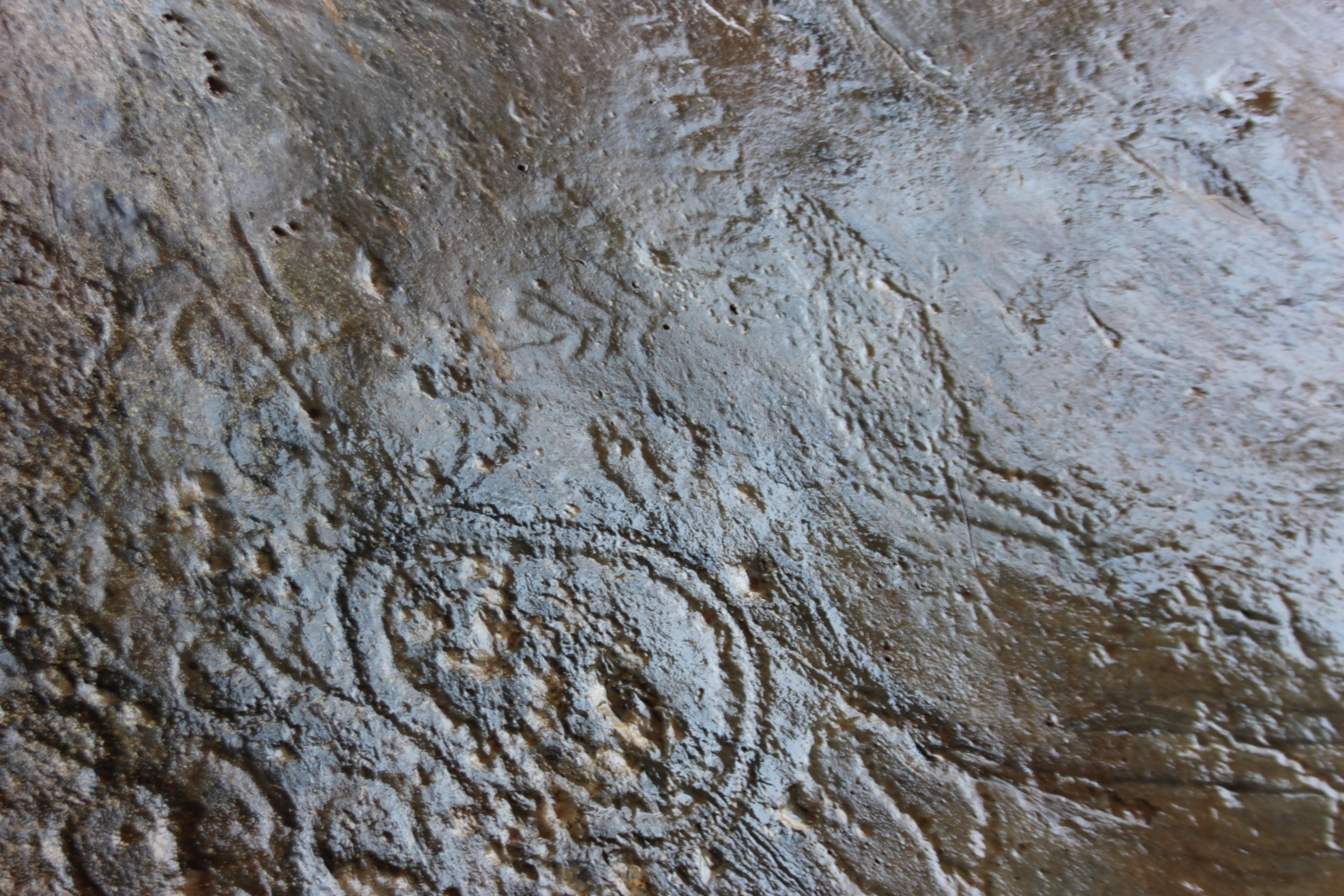
Low relief rock art in a limestone pavement 1

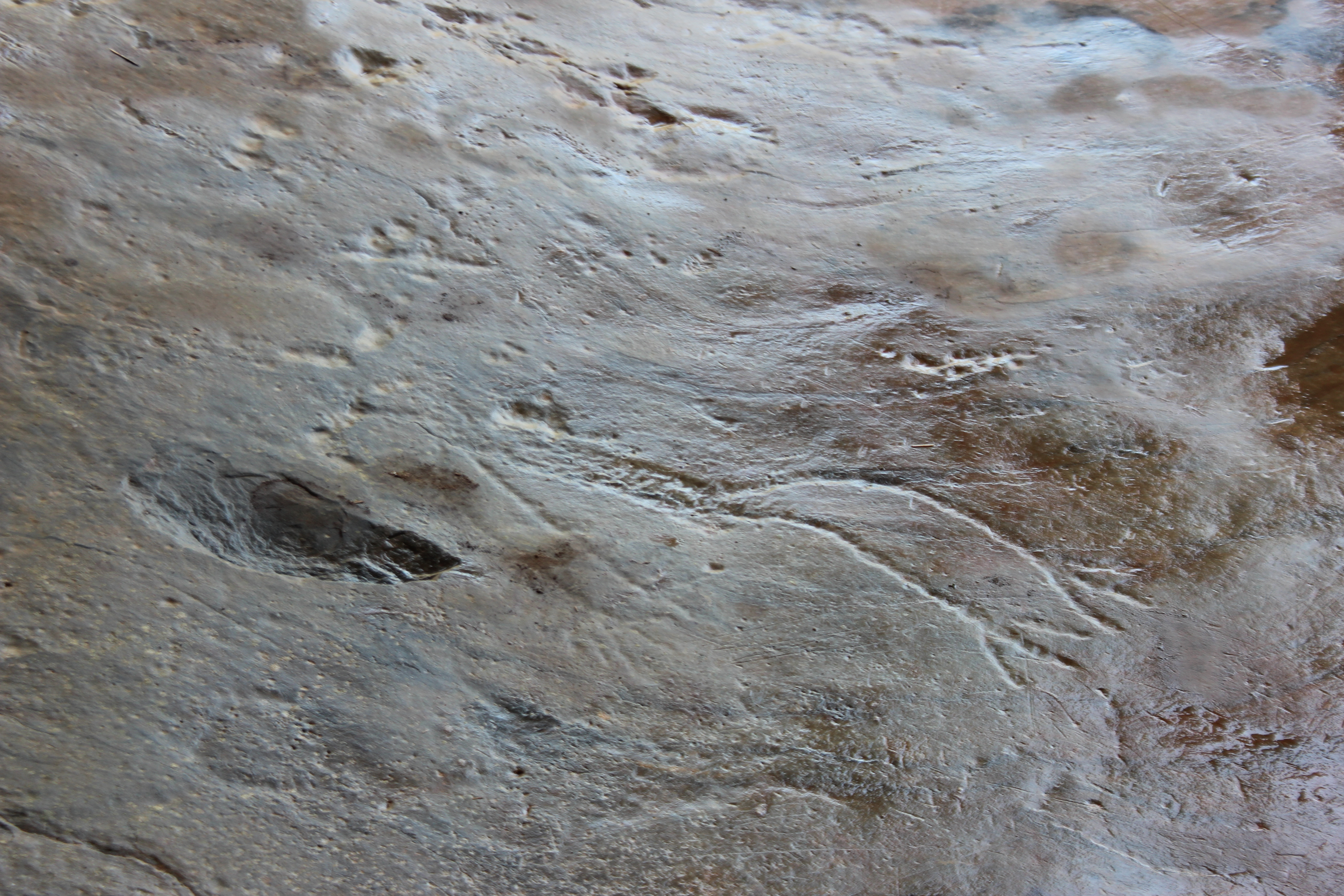
Low relief rock art in a limestone pavement 2

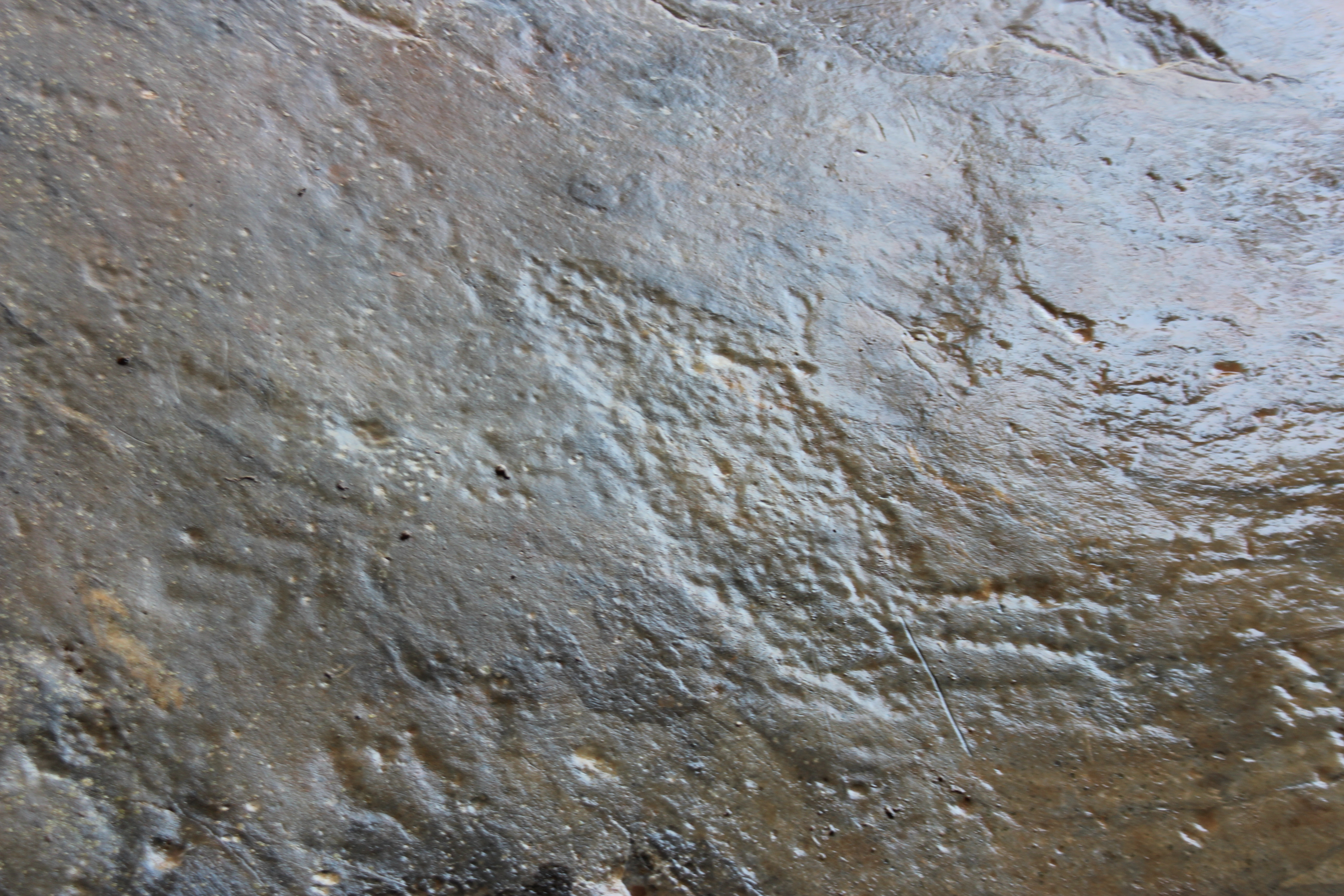
Low relief rock art in a limestone pavement 3

Low relief rock art - Video

== The Mortuary Patterns of Lapa do Santo ==
The 26 human burials from Lapa do Santo were divided into six different mortuary patterns based on their chronology and shared features.

=== Lapa do Santo Mortuary Pattern 1 ===
LSMP-1 is dated to 9.7-10.6 cal kyBP and is characterized by two primary single burials in flexed position (Burials 1 and 27).

Lapa do Santo - Burial 1 and Burial 27

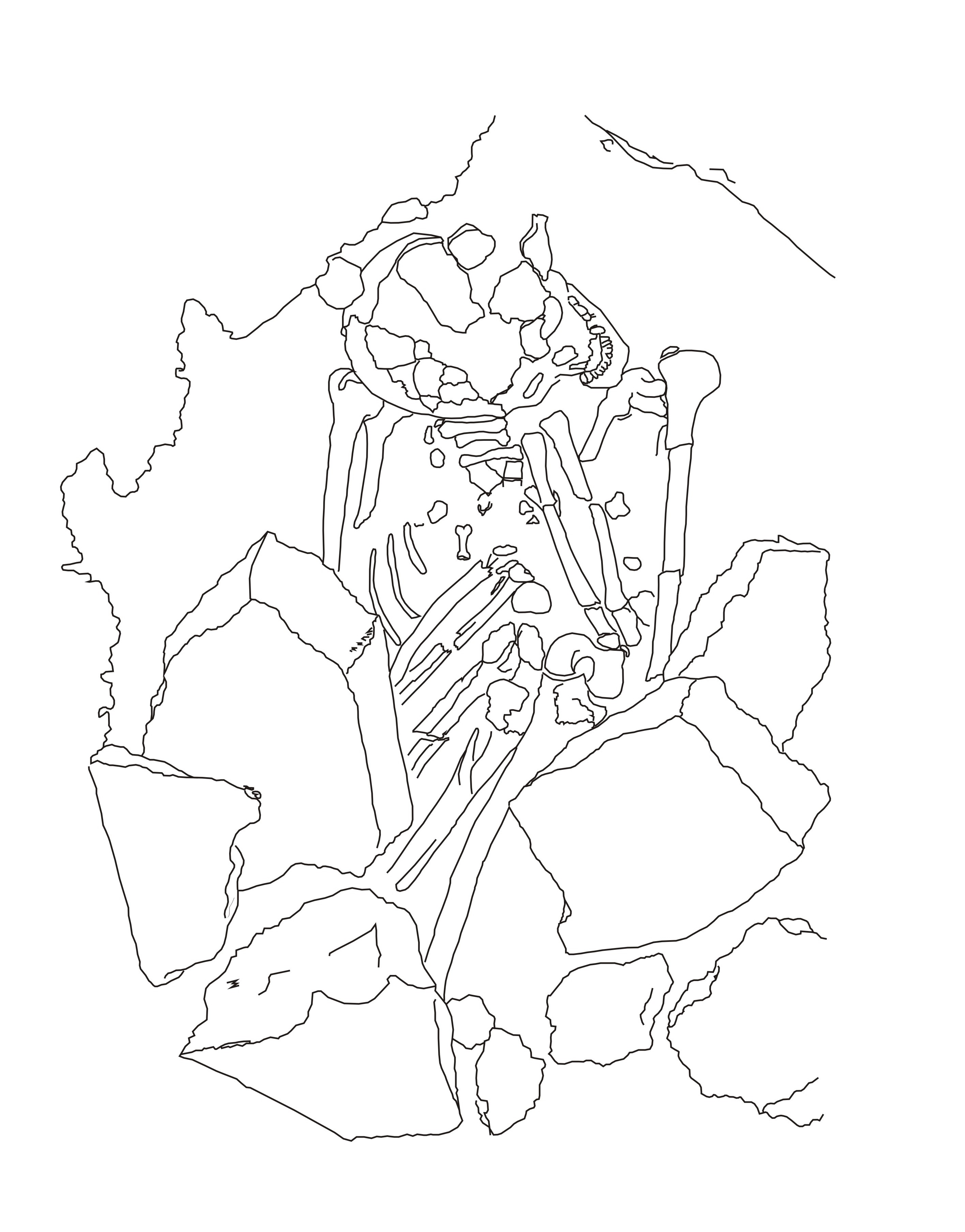
Burial 1 - A complete fully articulated adult skeleton (phase 1)

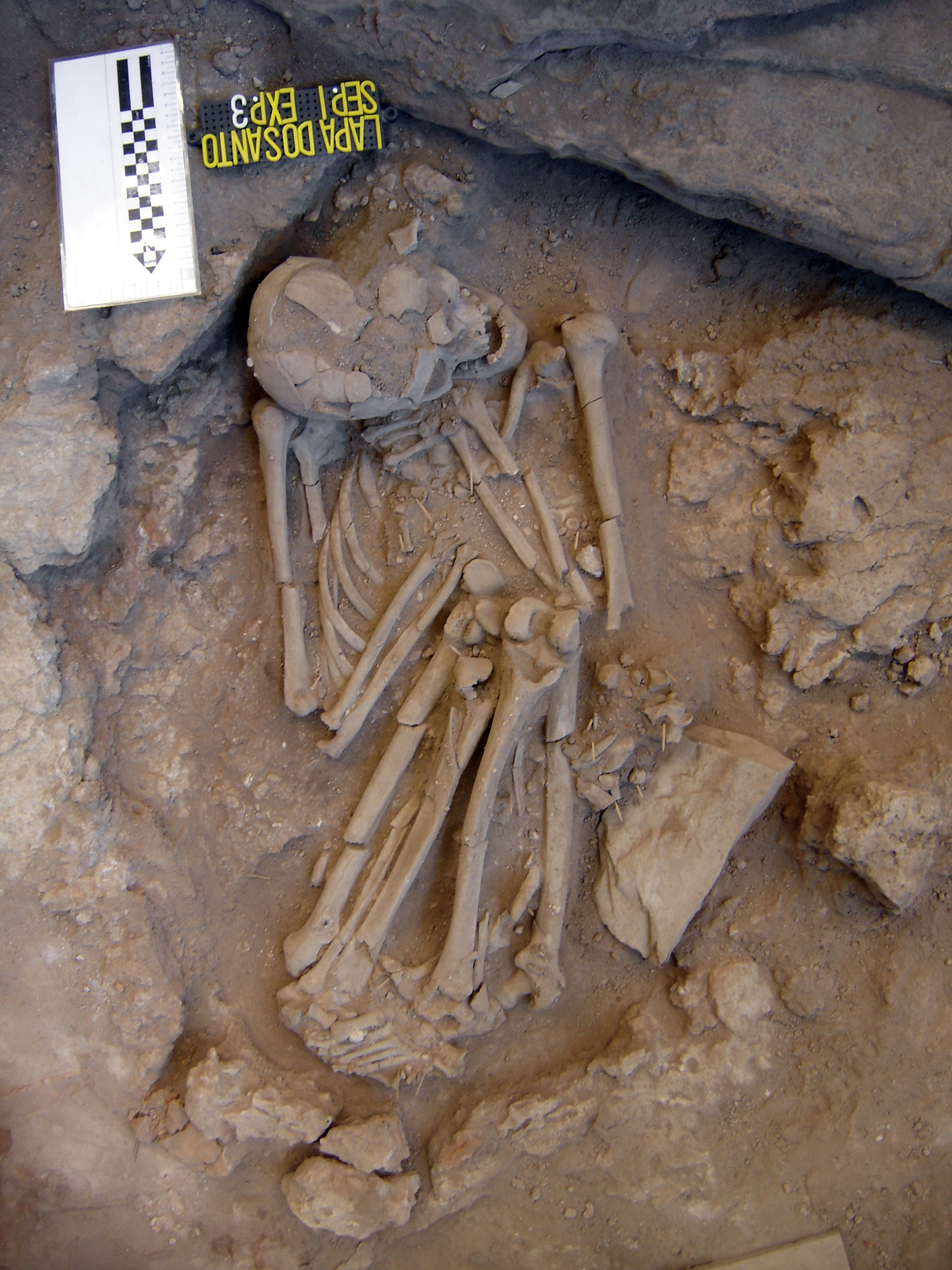
Burial 1 - A complete fully articulated adult skeleton (phase 3)

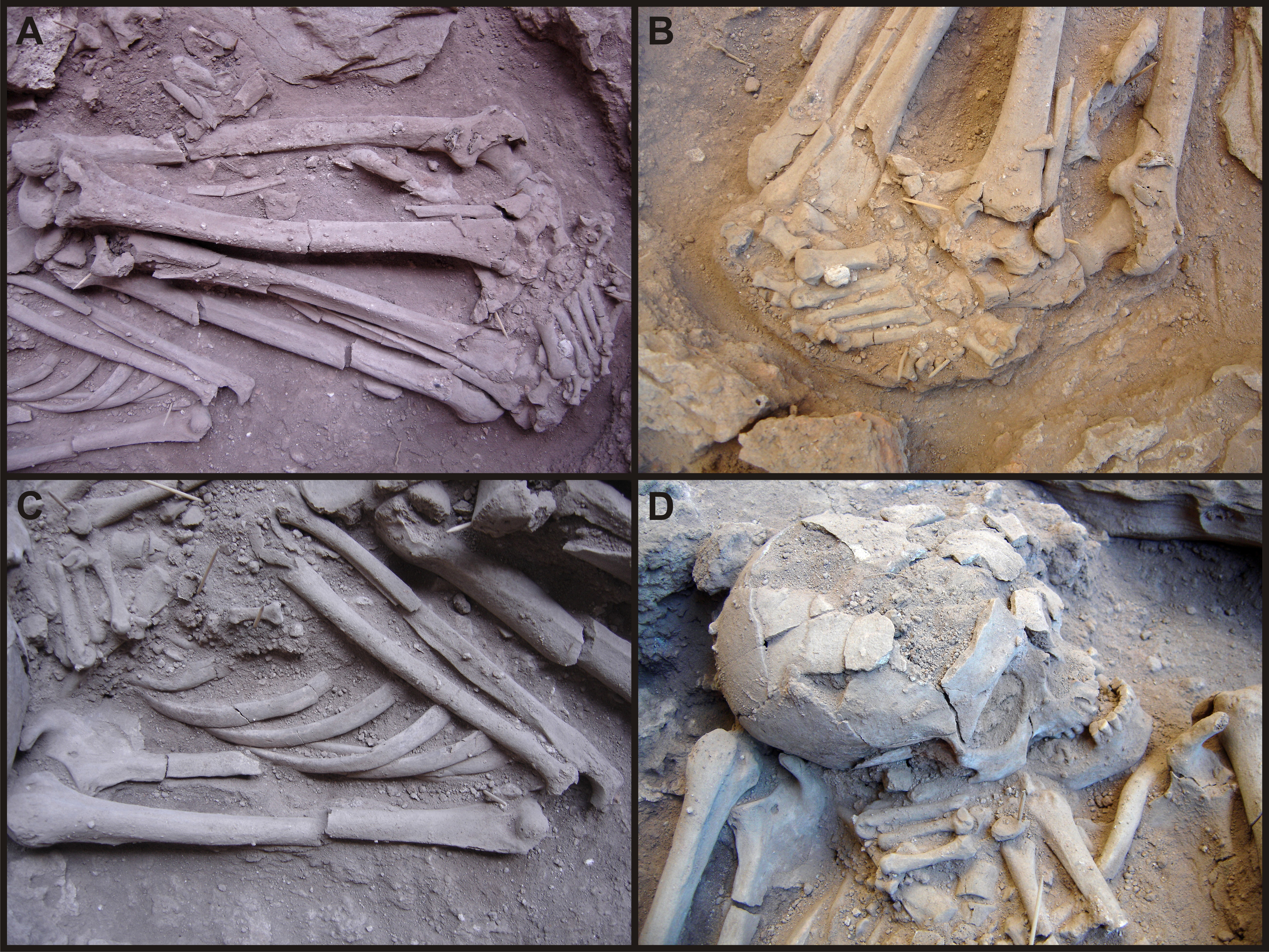
Burial 1. Detail of body position.

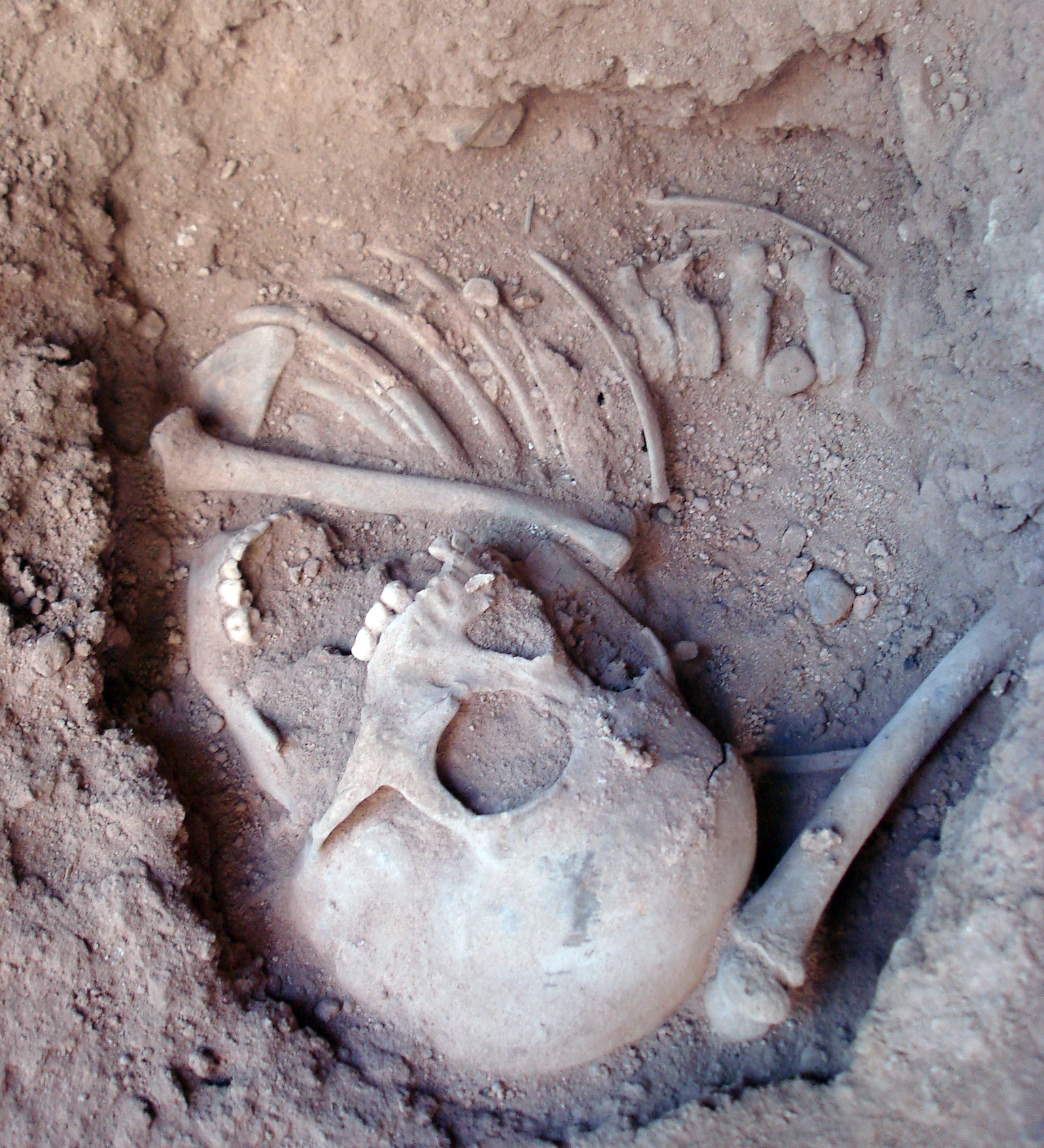
Burial 27 - A complete fully articulated child skeleton

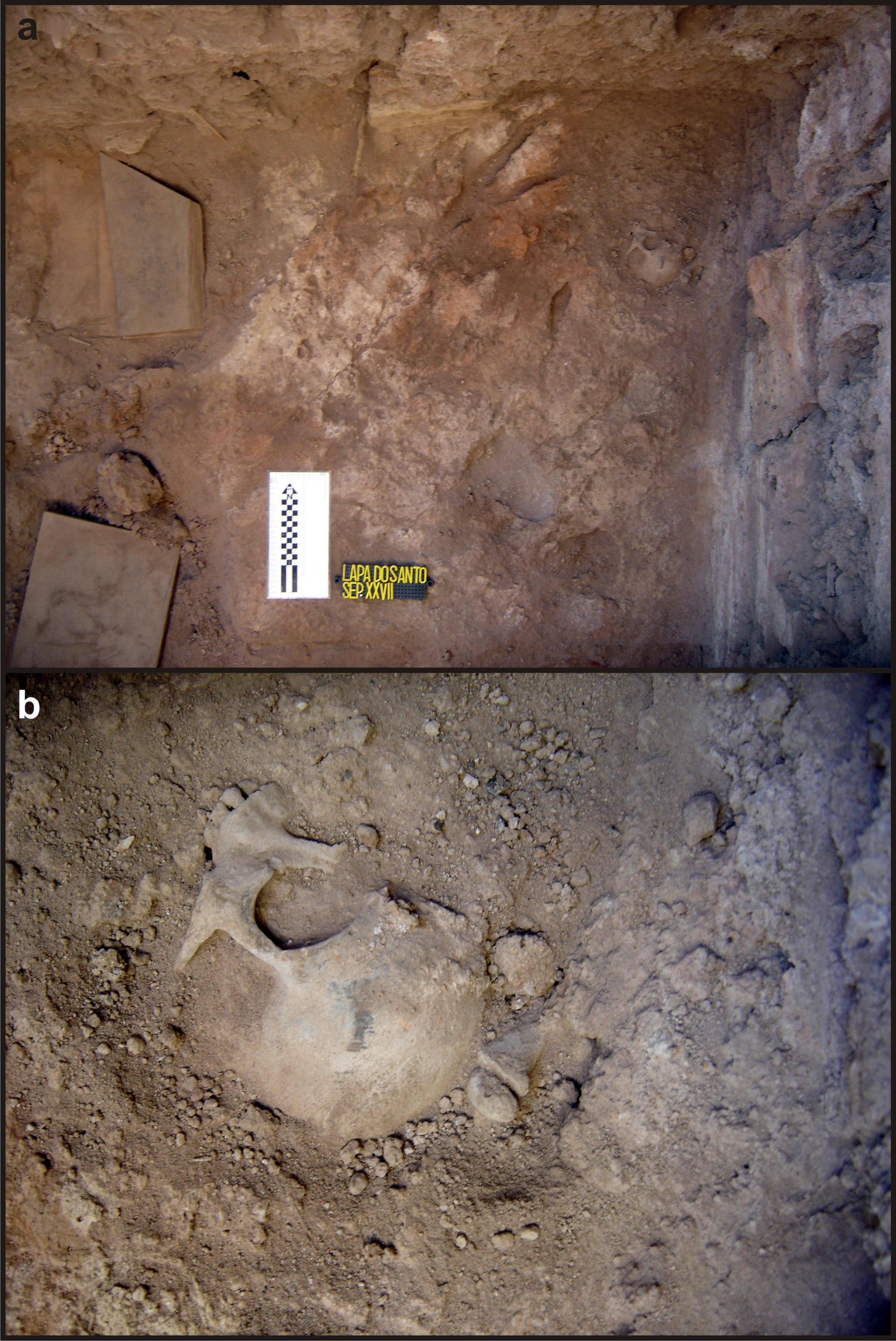
Burial 27 - Field pictures

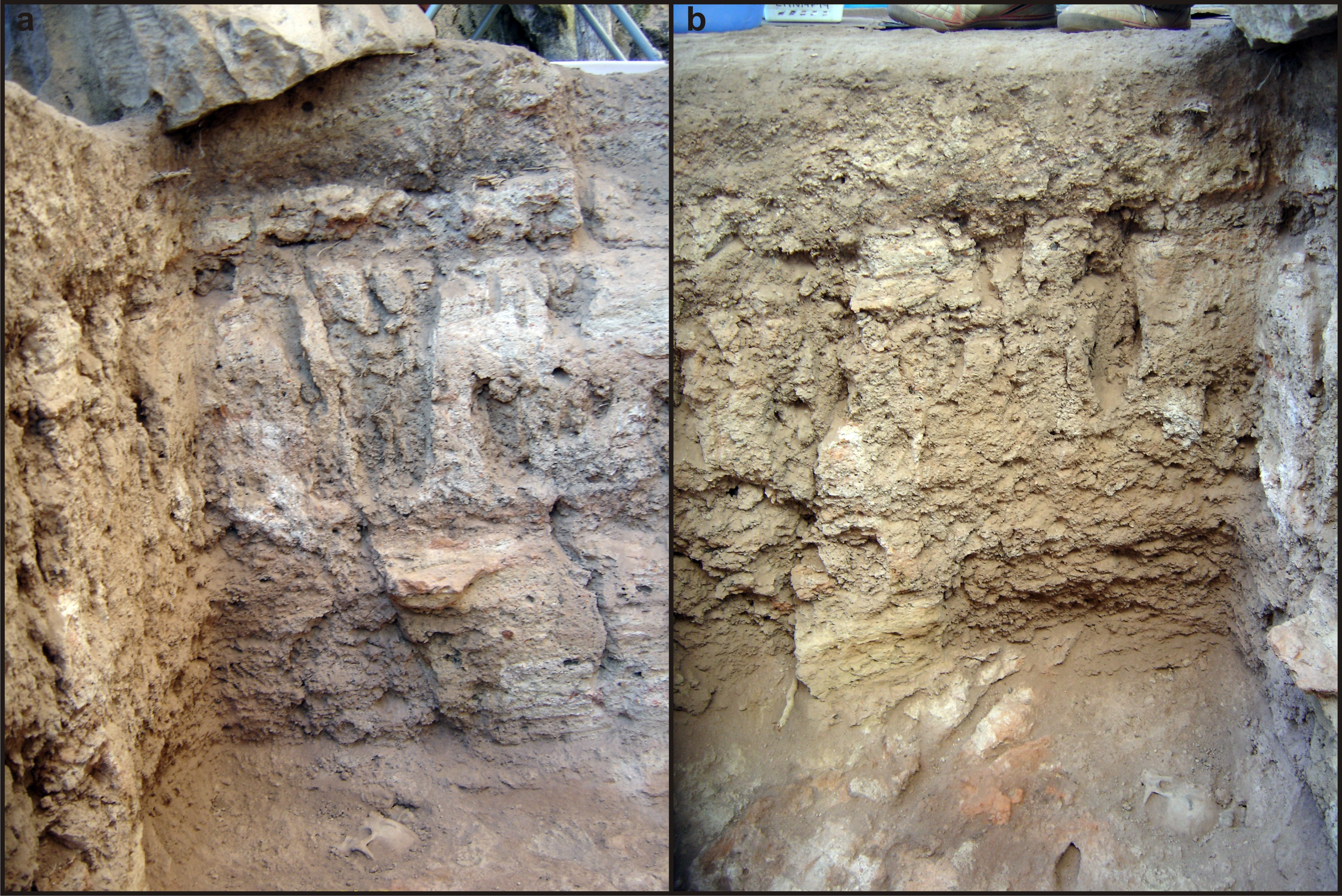
Burial 27 - Field picture at first appearance of the cranium,

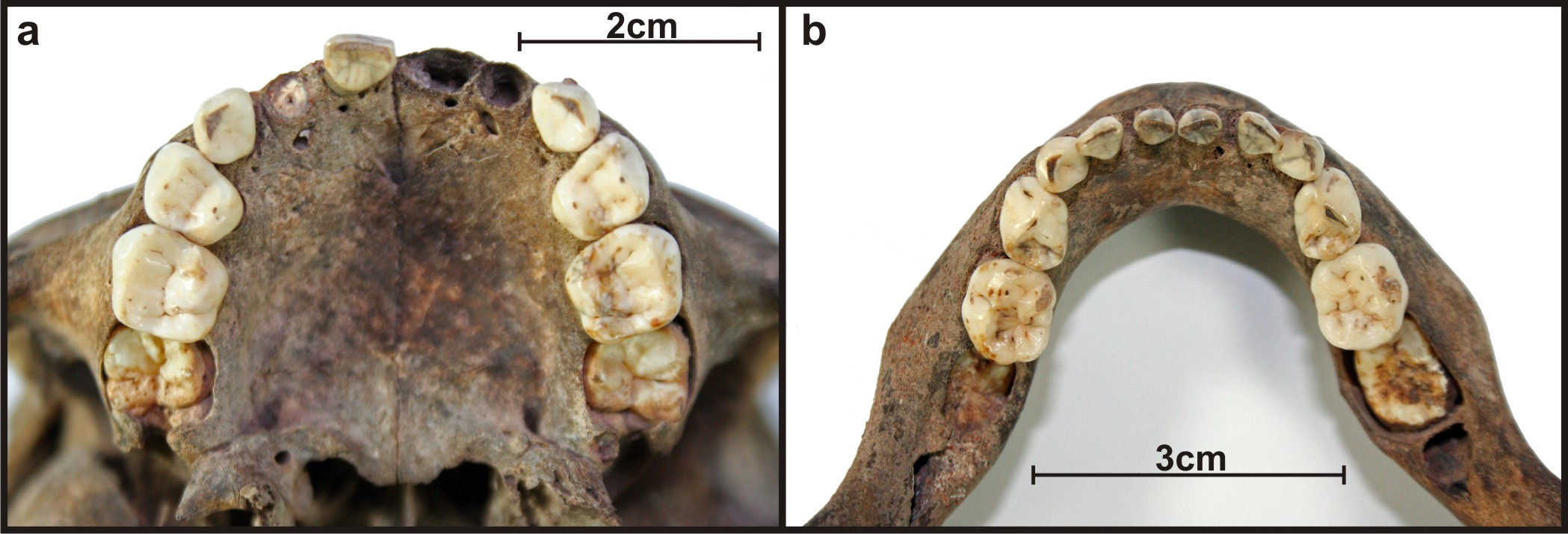
Burial 27 - Dental eruption.

=== Lapa do Santo Mortuary Pattern 2 ===
Lapa do Santo Mortuary Pattern 2 (LSMP-2) is dated to 9.4-9.6 cal kyBP and can be further subdivided into three categories: LSMP-2a (Burial 21 and 26), LSMP-2b (Burials 9, 14, 17, 18 and 23) and LSMP-2c (isolated bones). LSMP-2a is characterized by fully articulated partial skeletons with cutting and chopping marks. In Burial 21, the midshafts of both tibiae and fibulae were chopped and removed while soft tissue was still present. Burial 26 is a severed head with the first six cervical vertebrae articulated in anatomical position. The hyoid bone was missing and both amputated hands were laid over the face. Scanning electron microscopy and confocal microscopy of the cut-marks shows the presence of parallel micro-striations and a V-shaped transversal profile, indicating the use of stone flakes as the cutting agent. In conjunction the evidence show LSMP-2a involved the mutilation of fresh corpses.

Lapa do Santo - Burial 21 and Burial 26

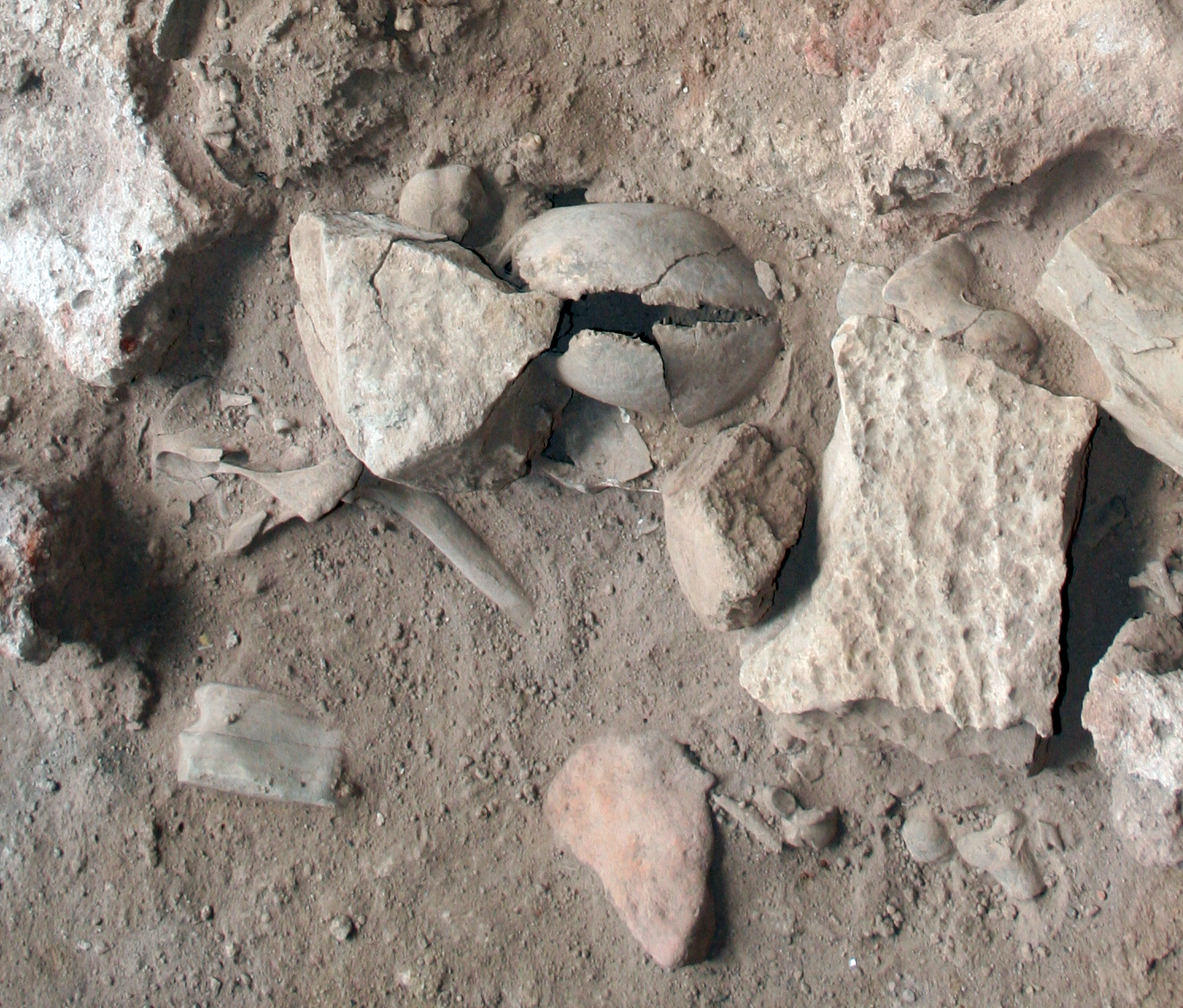
Burial 21 - Large blocks were on top of the skeleton

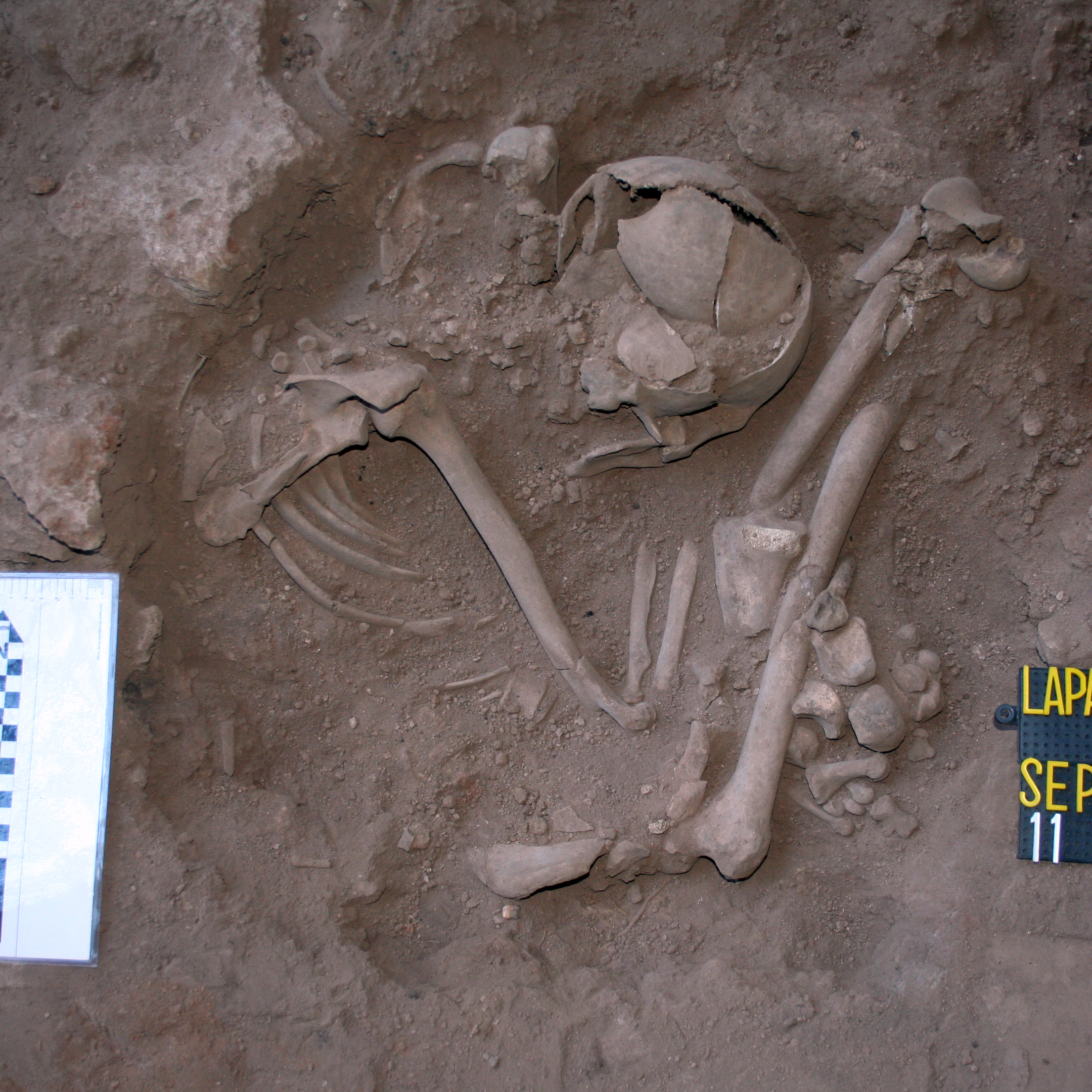
Burial 21 - The tubular parts of the lower legs were chopped and removed.

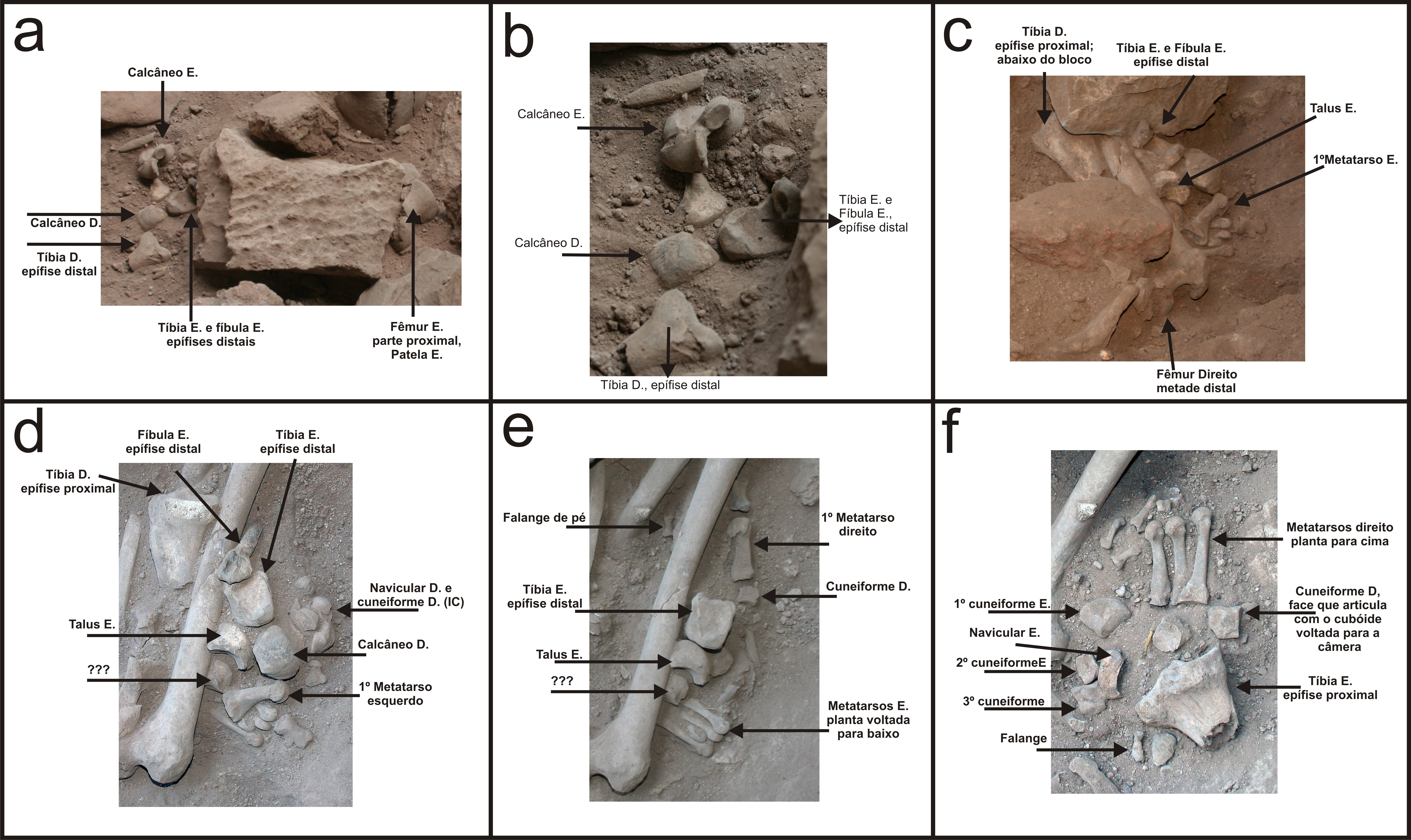
Burial 21 - Area affected by the removal of lower legs diaphysis.

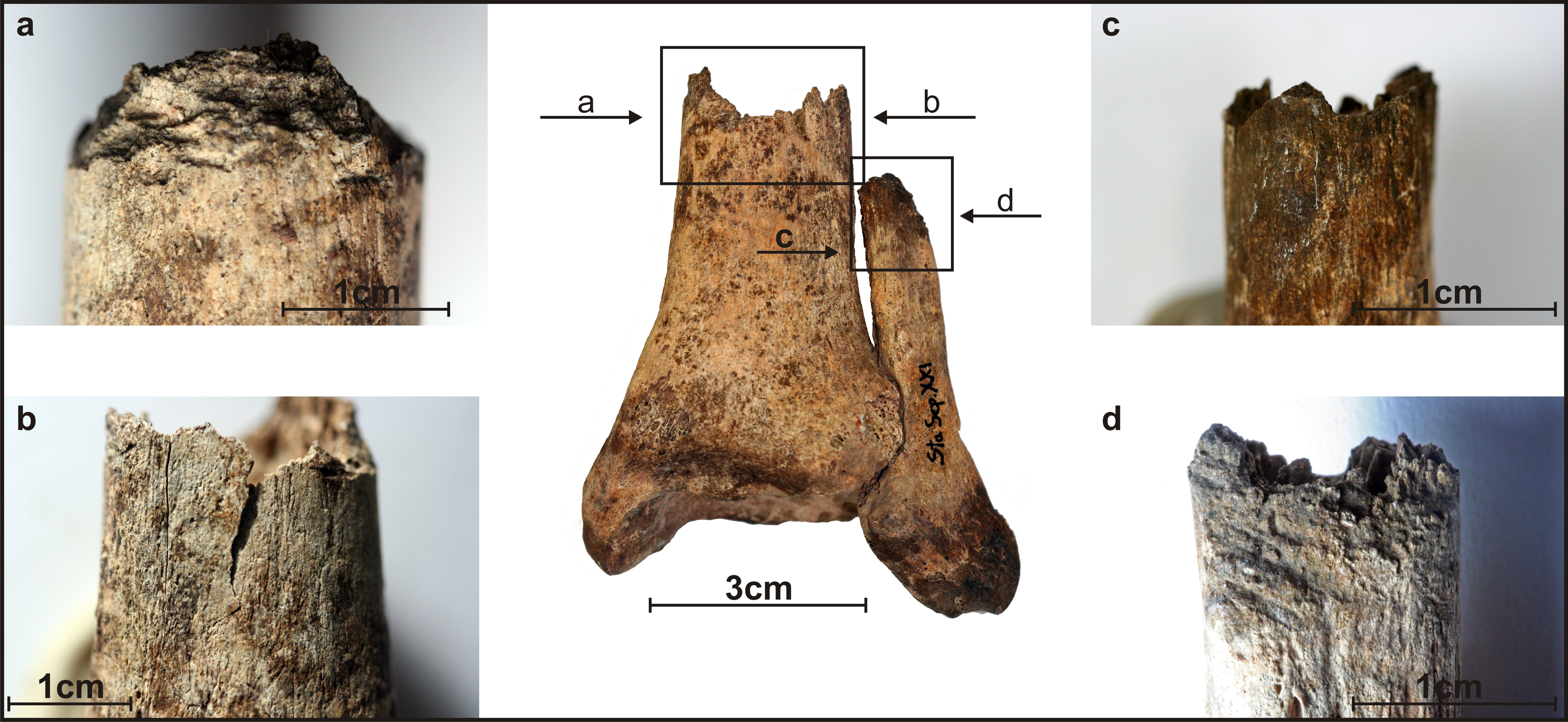
Burial 21 - Manipulation of the corpse while soft tissues were still present.

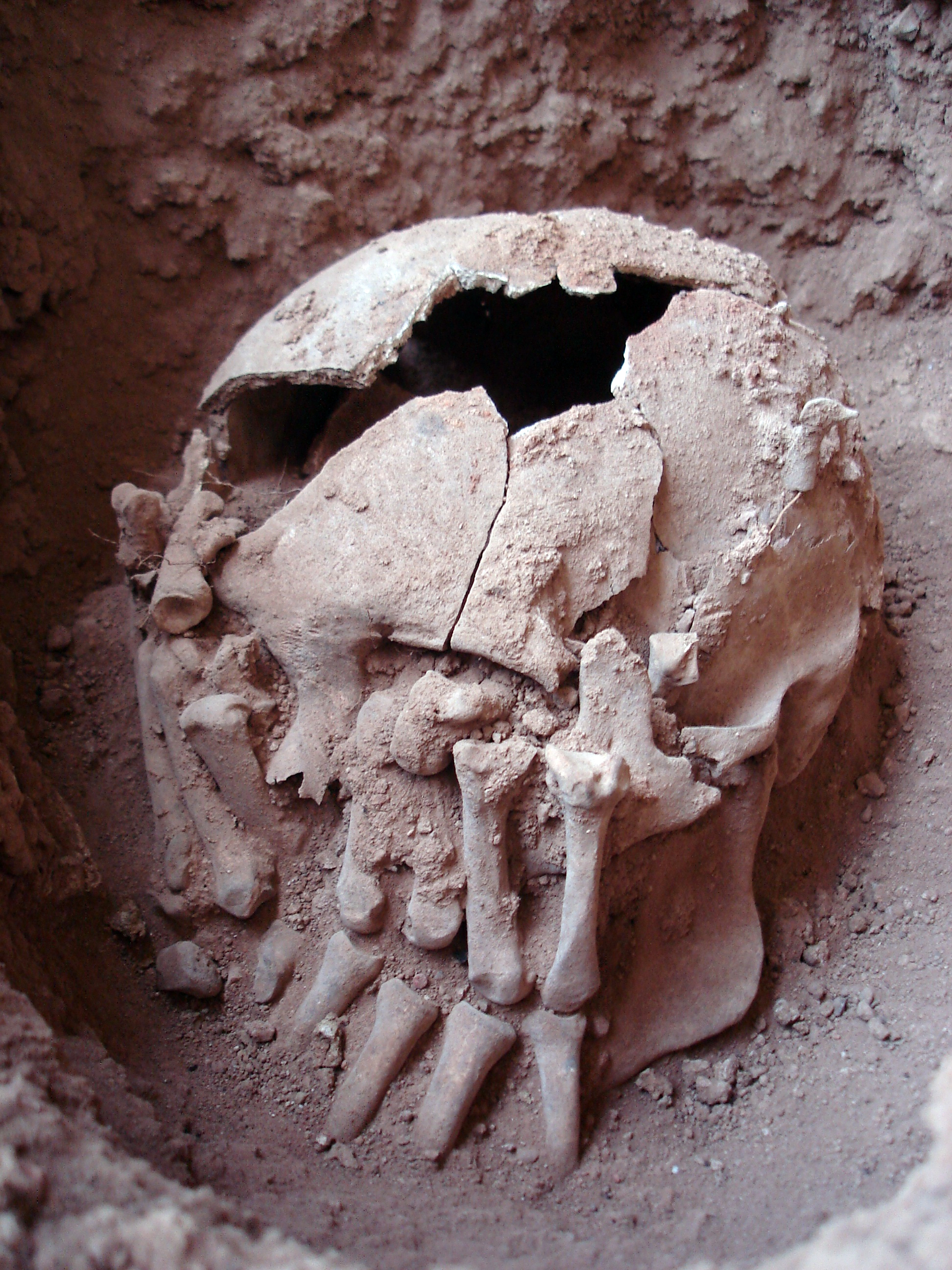
Burial 26 - Decapitation and amputated hands.

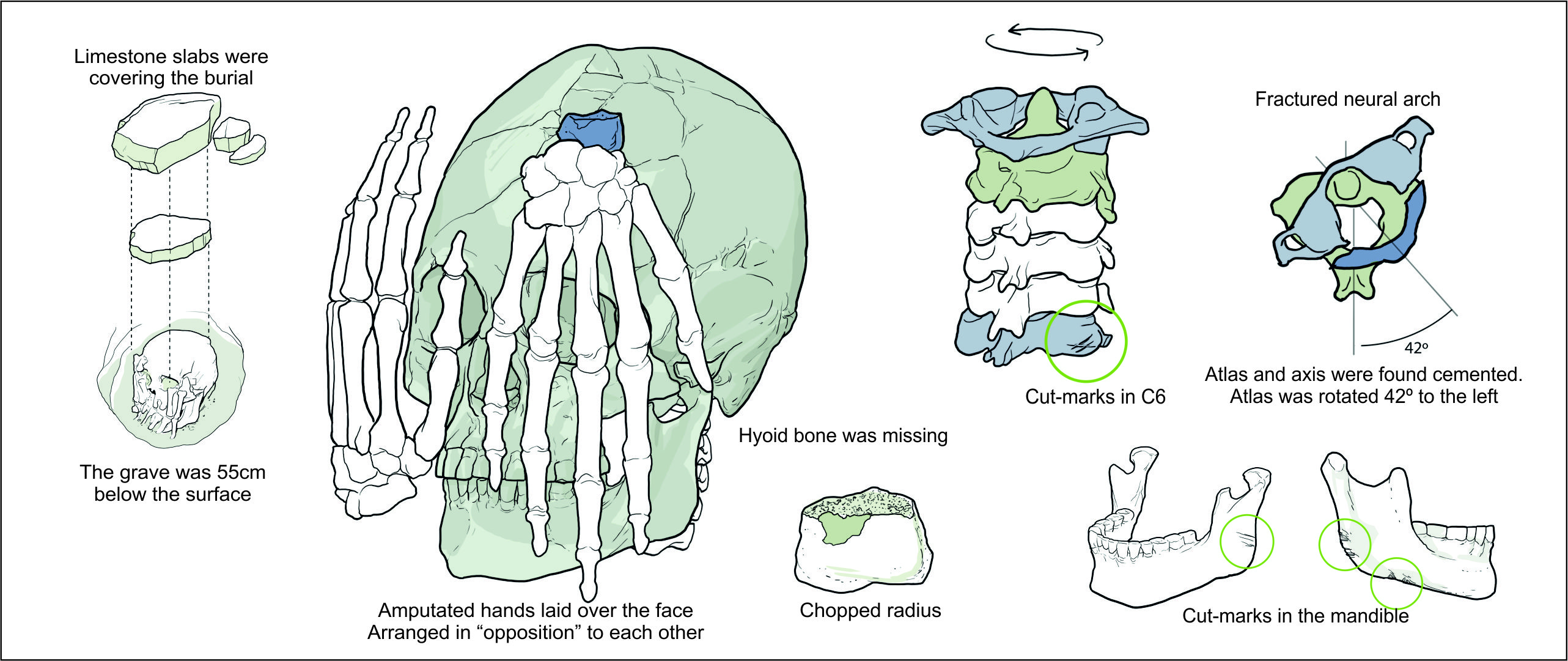
Burial 26 - Decapitation

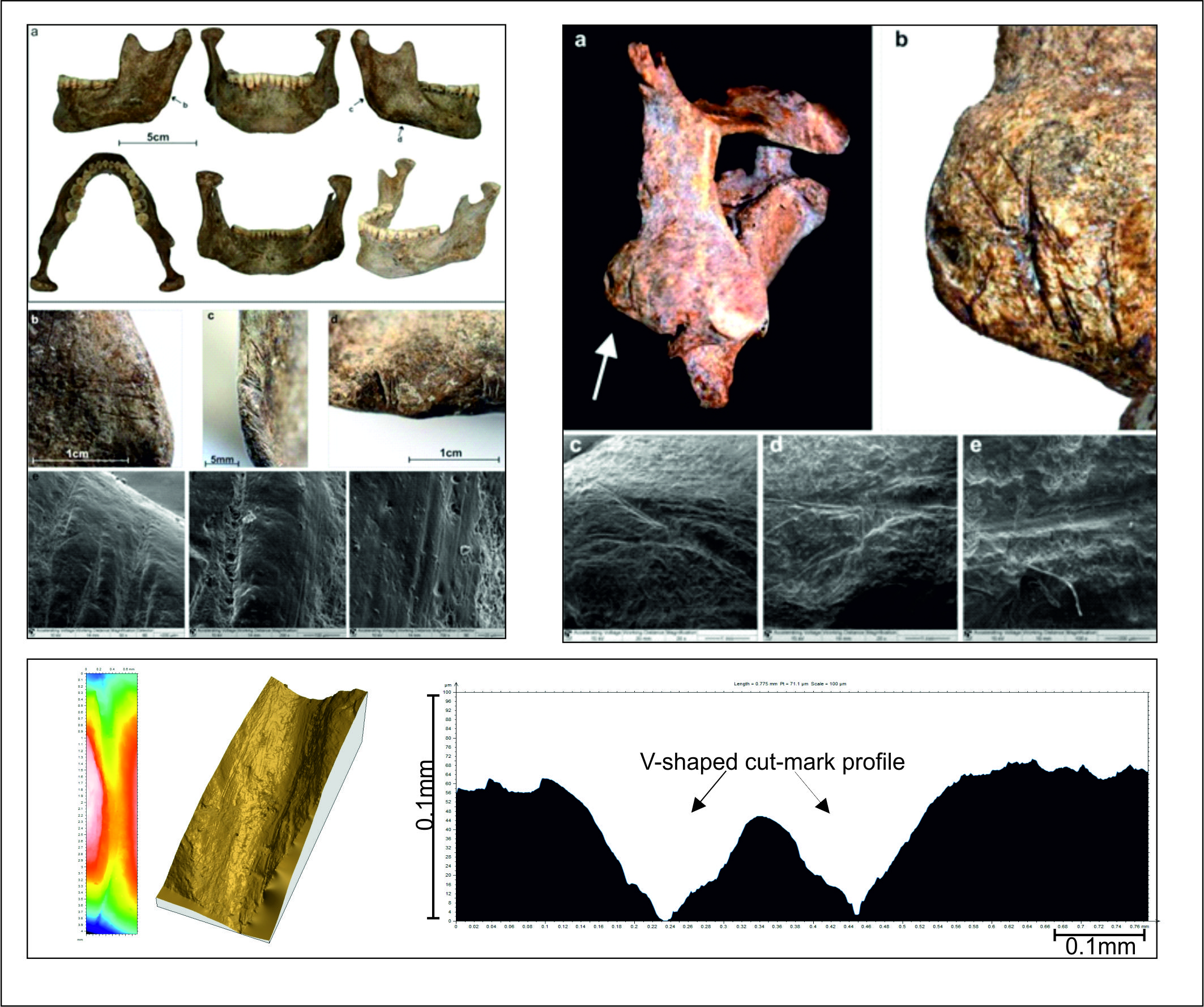
Burial 26 - Distribution and microscopic observation of cut-marks.

Burial 26 - The oldest case of decapitation in the New World

Burial 26 - Retrodeformation of the cranium

LSMP-2b is characterized by graves filled with the fully disarticulated bones of up to five individuals presenting a strong selection of anatomical parts. Some bones show evidence of exposure to fire, application of red pigment, defleshing, cutting, chopping and removal of teeth. Burials 14, 17 and 18 were composed of a bundle of long bones from one or two individuals, deposited with the individualized cranium and/or mandible of a different individual. Bundles comprising infant post-cranial bones were found next to adult crania (Burials 14 and 17), and bundles comprising adult post-cranial bones were found next to an infant cranium (Burial 18). The long bones of the bundles had been chopped and segregated into extremities and midshafts and in some cases the latter were further chopped into smaller sections. The cranium of Burial 17 was used as a funerary receptacle and filled with chopped burnt bones some of which present defleshing cut-marks. Black burn marks limited to the anterior portion of the external maxillary alveolar margin indicate exposure to fire while soft tissue was still present. The co-occurrence of chopped and defleshed bones with signs of burning with soft tissues suggests that LSMP-2 may have involved some form of cannibalism. In Burials 17 and 18, all teeth were intentionally removed and the coronoid processes of Burial 18's mandible were drilled. Red pigment was abundantly applied to the bones of Burial 14and Burial 18. Burial 23 was composed of a cranium calotte filled with 54 permanent and 30 deciduous teeth, some of which belonged to the skull of Burial 17. Burial 9 was an individualized child skull placed near the pelvis of an individual of similar age. The deciduous dentition was removed and an assemblage of human teeth and chopped midshafts (accession code: LSt-2253) were deposited next to Burial 9. LSMP-2c is defined by isolated burnt chopped bones that were not part of any formal burial and the presence of rodent gnaw marks could indicate they were subject to scavenging and not immediately buried.

Lapa do Santo - Burial 9

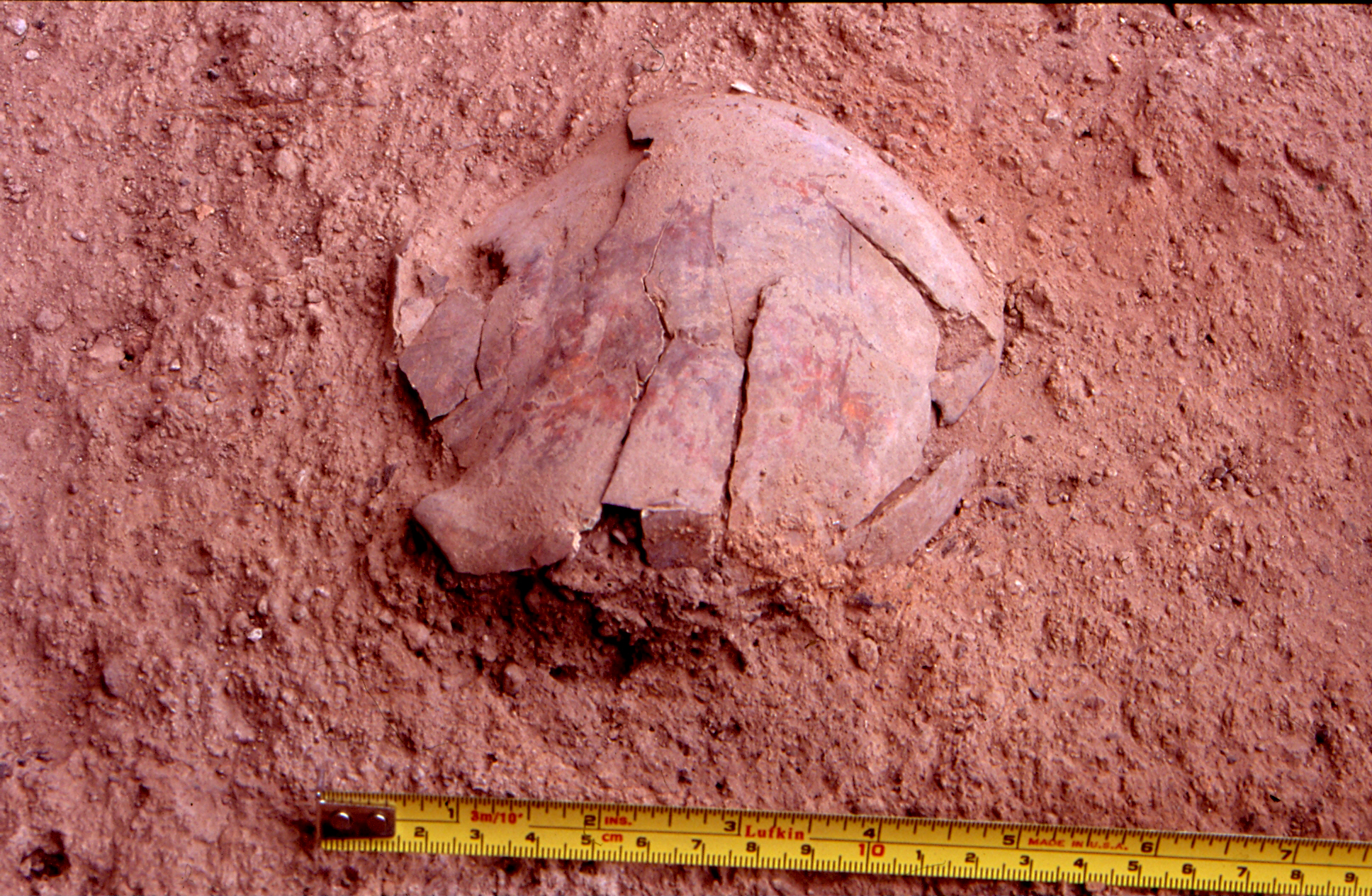
Burial 9 - Field picture during early stages of excavation

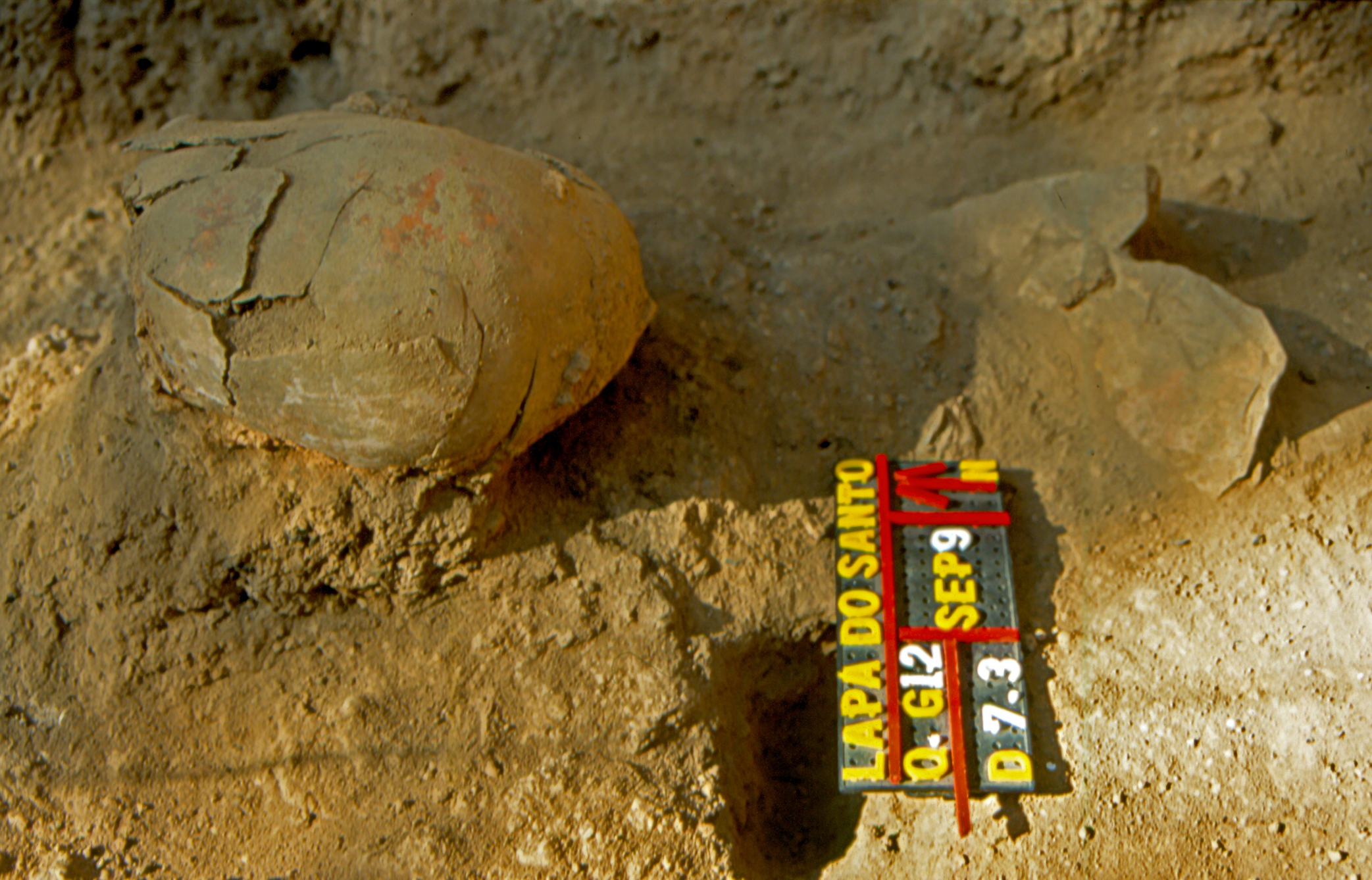
Burial 9 - Field picture during the excavation process

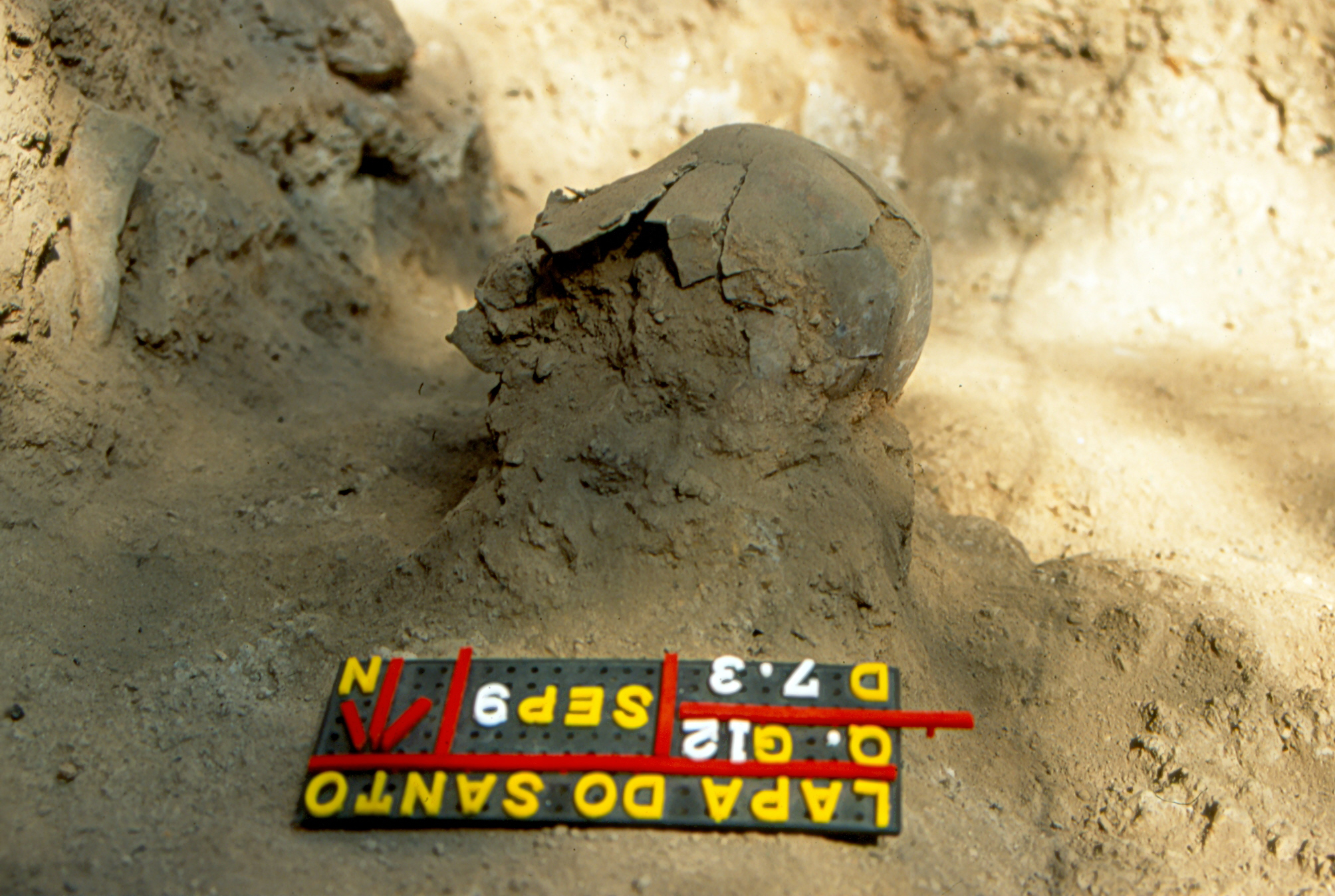
Burial 9 - Field picture before the cranium was collected.

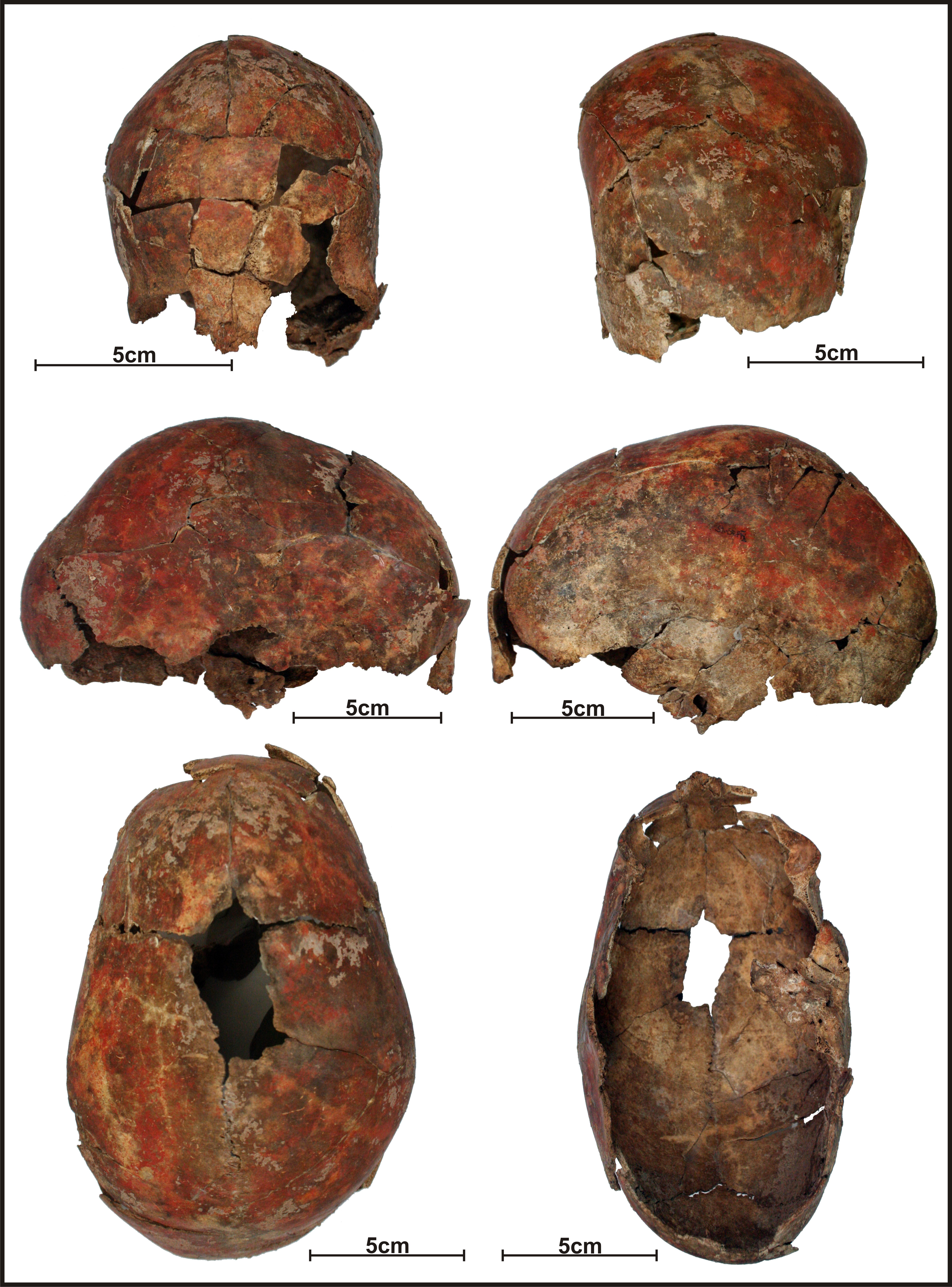
Burial 9 - Cranium in different views. Note the application of red pigment.

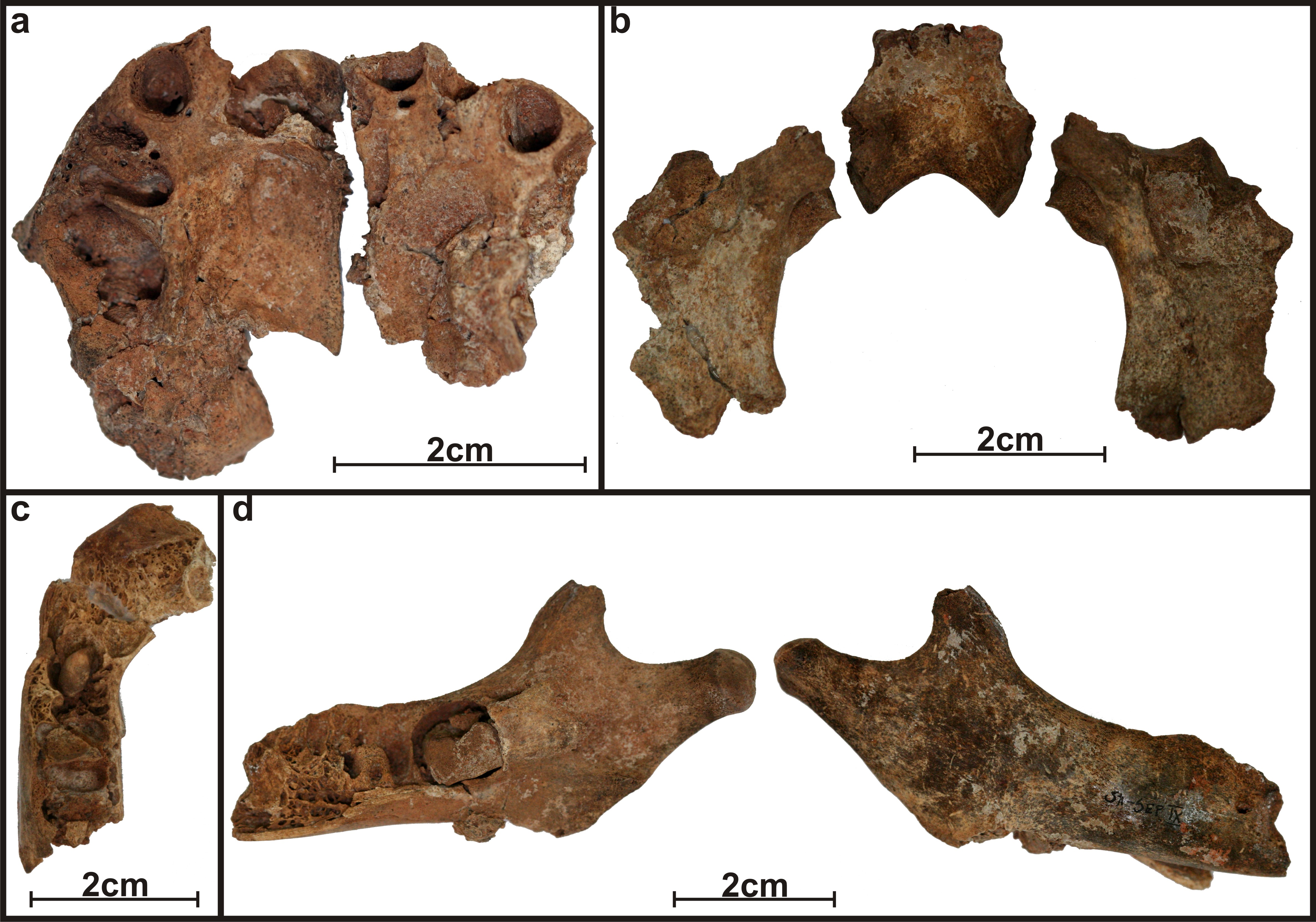
Burial 9 - Bones of the skull. Note the absence of erupted teeth.

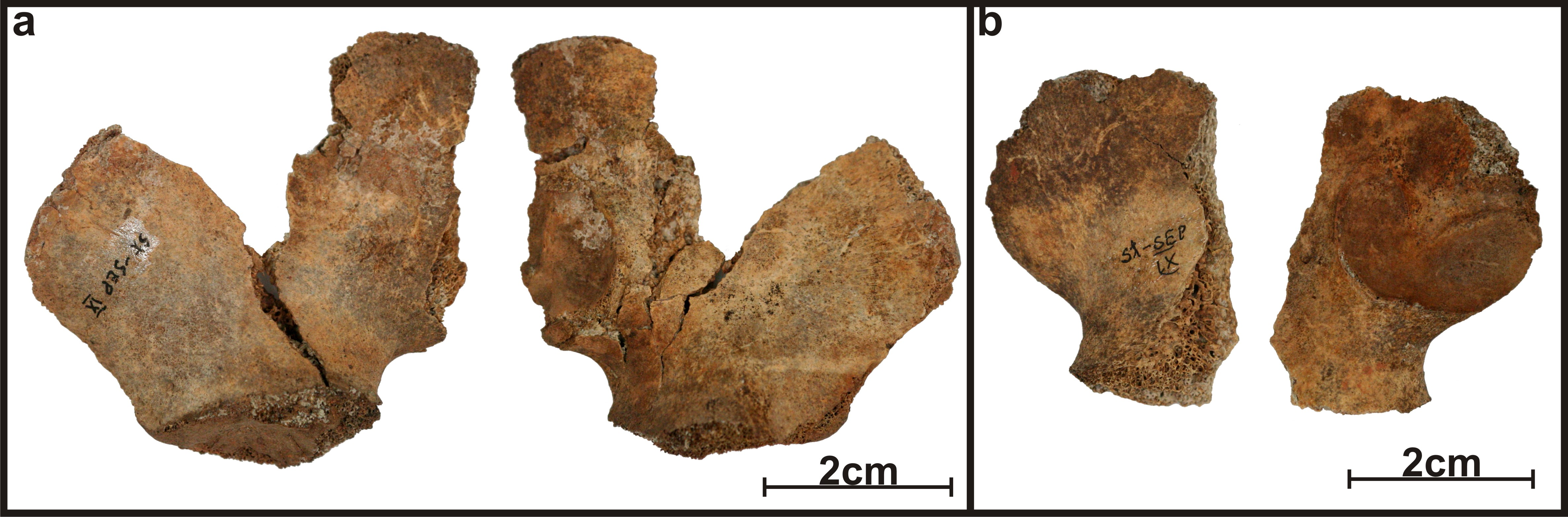
Burial 9 - Bones of the pelvis were also recovered.

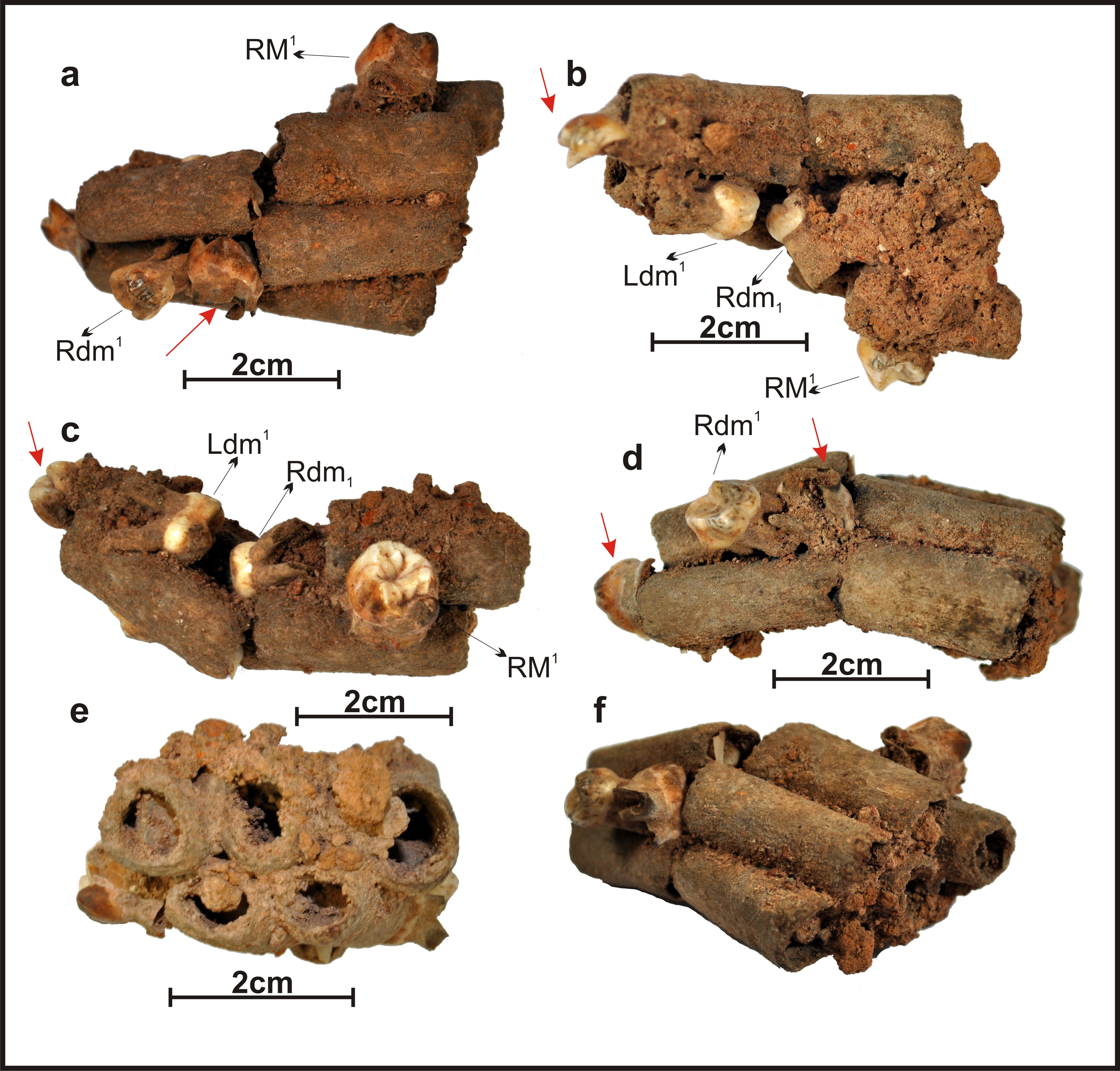
Burial 9 - 'Assemblage' of cut human long bones and teeth.

Burial 9 - Bone assemblage. 3d and slices.

Burial 9 - Bone assemblage 3D high res
Lapa do Santo - Burial 14

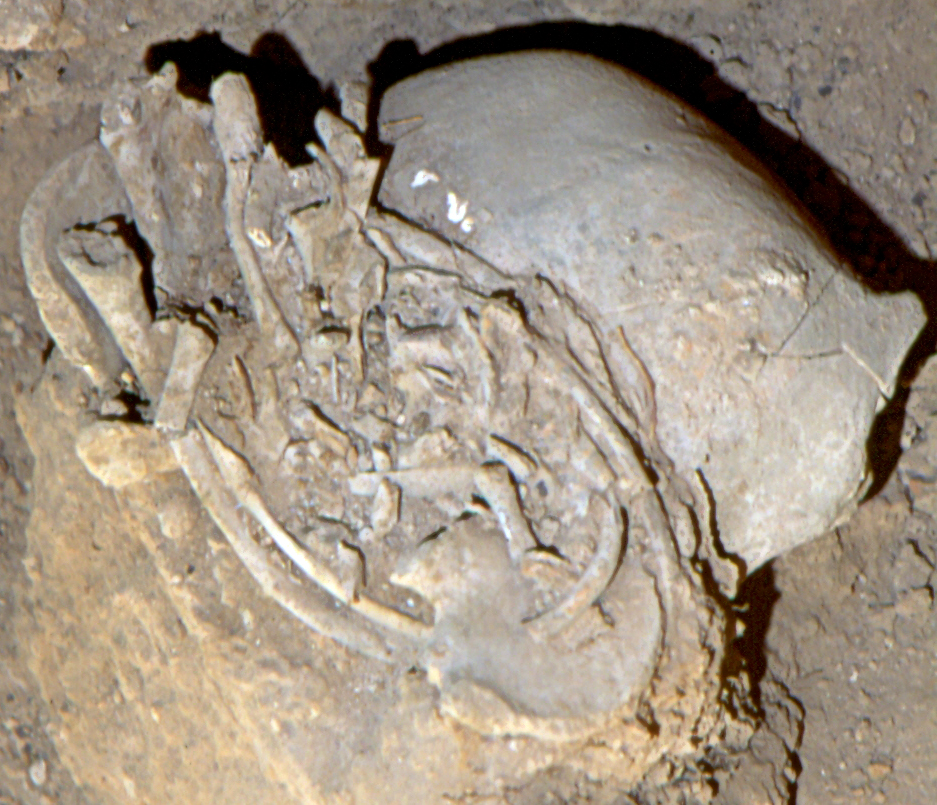
Burial 14 - Disarticulated post-cranial remains of two children were deposited next an adult cranium.

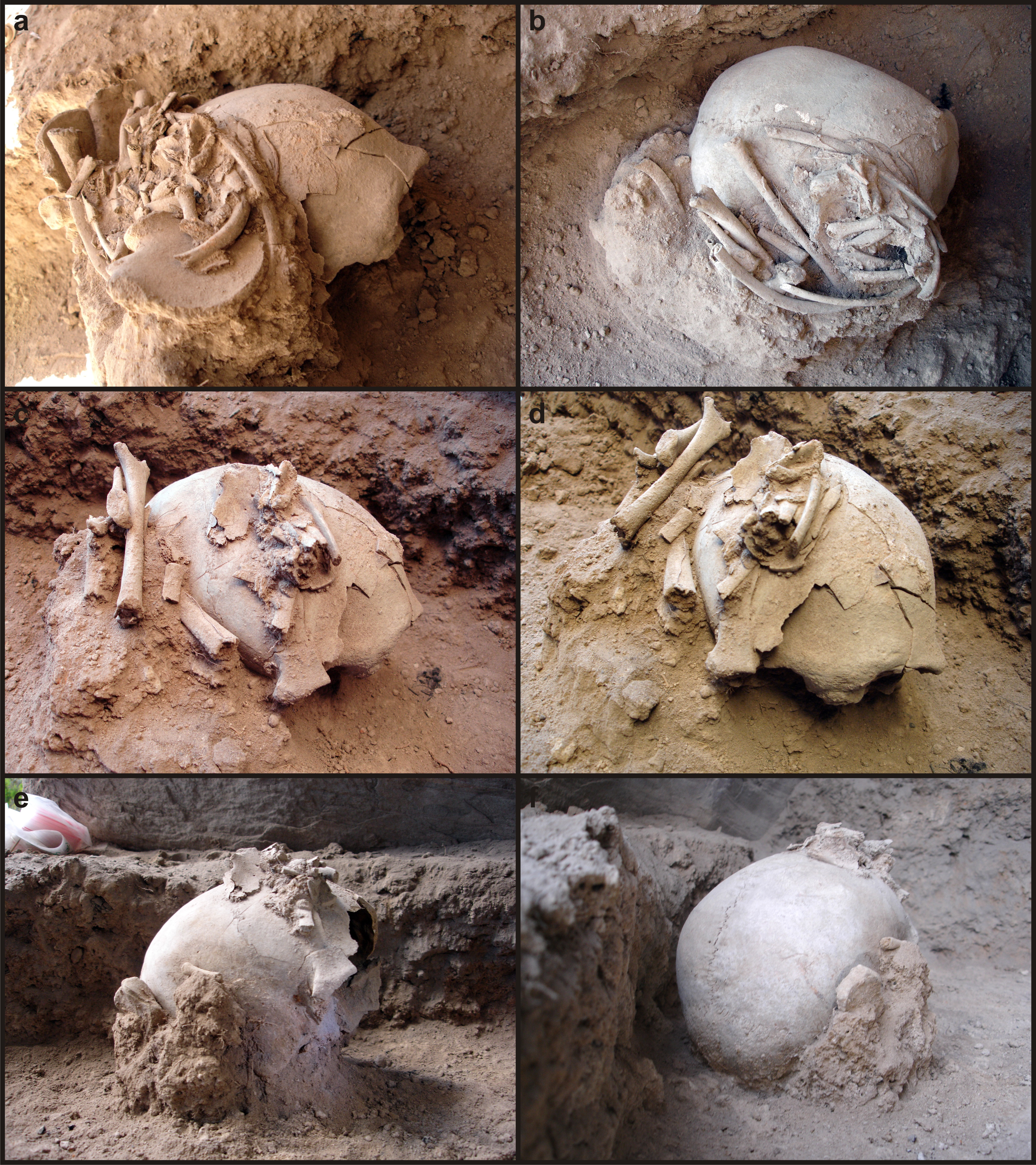
Burial 14 - Multiple views during excavation process.

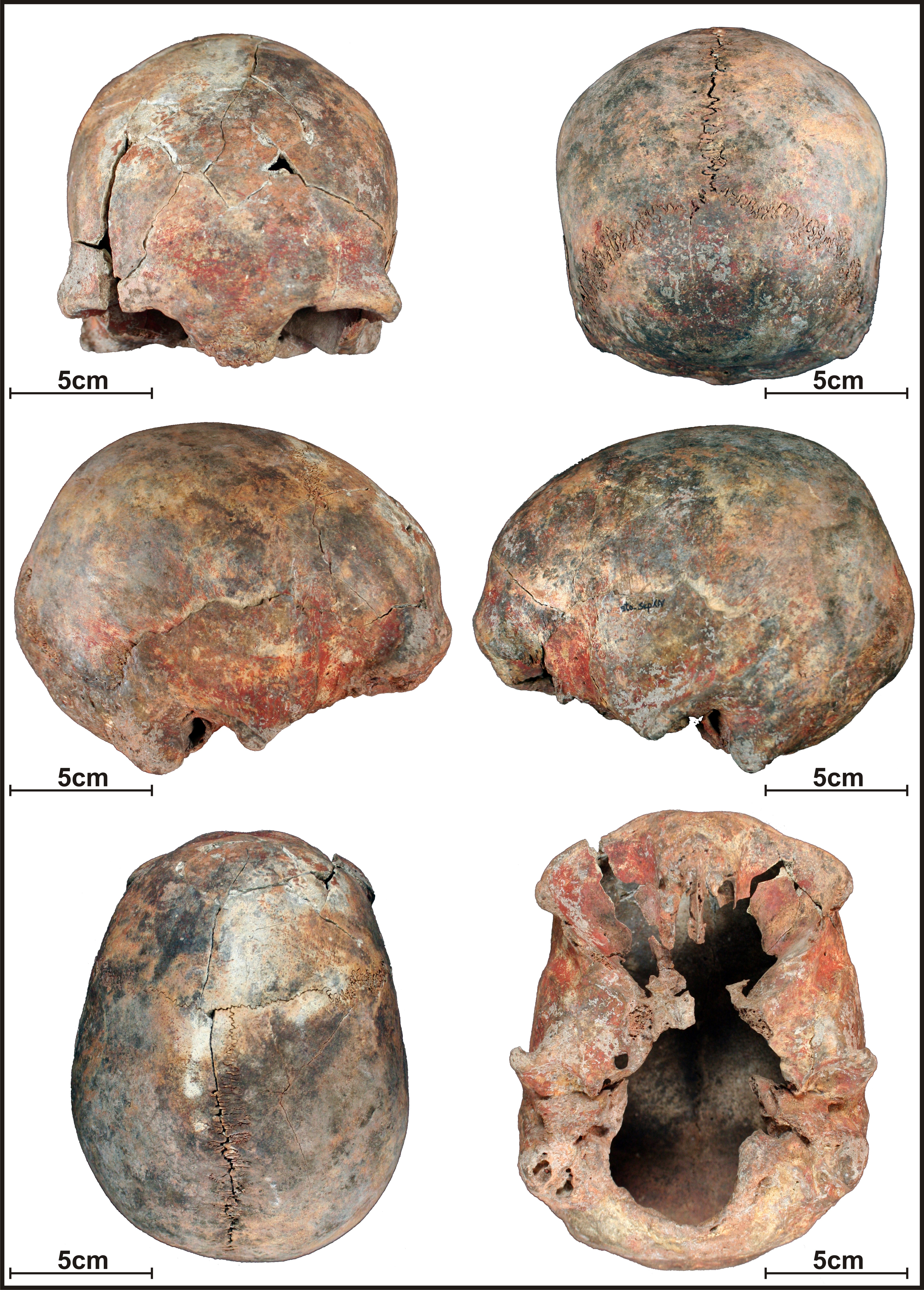
Burial 14 - Cranium. Note the presence of red pigment.

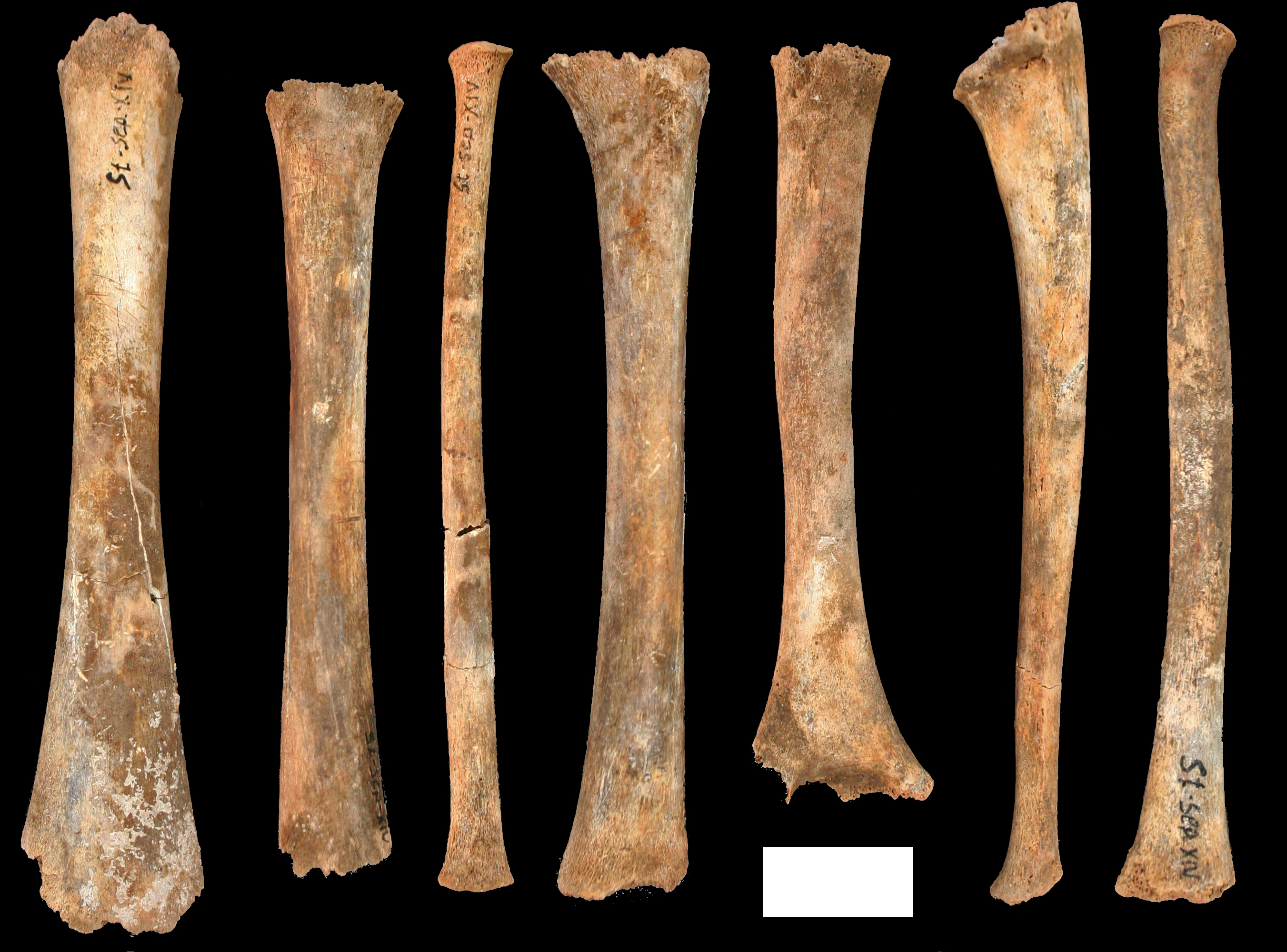
Burial 14 - Long bones of two children showing intentional removal of extremities and possible bite marks.

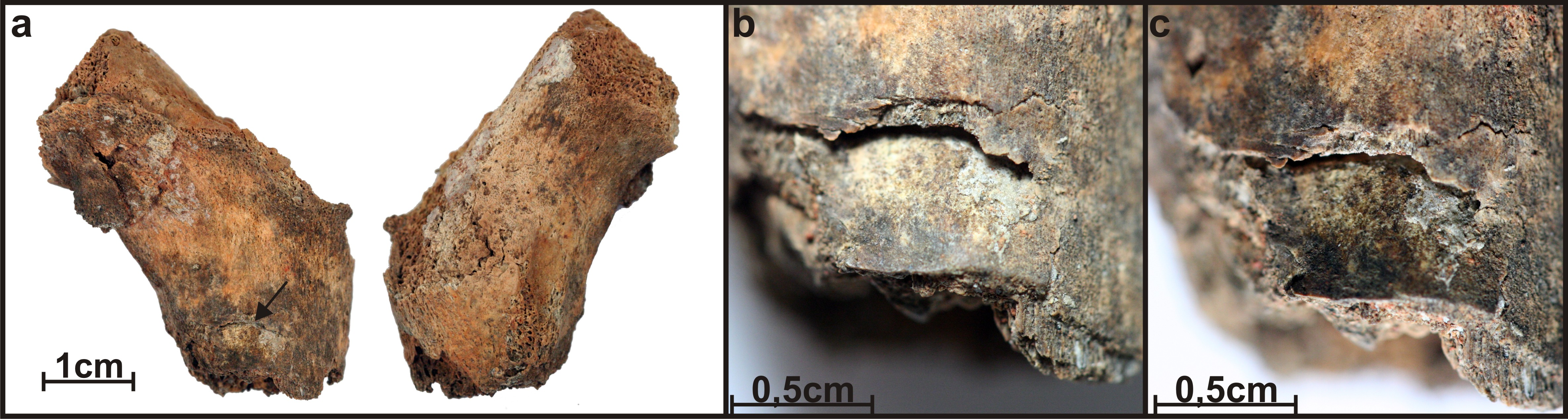
Burial 14 - Detailed view of chopped femur extremity.

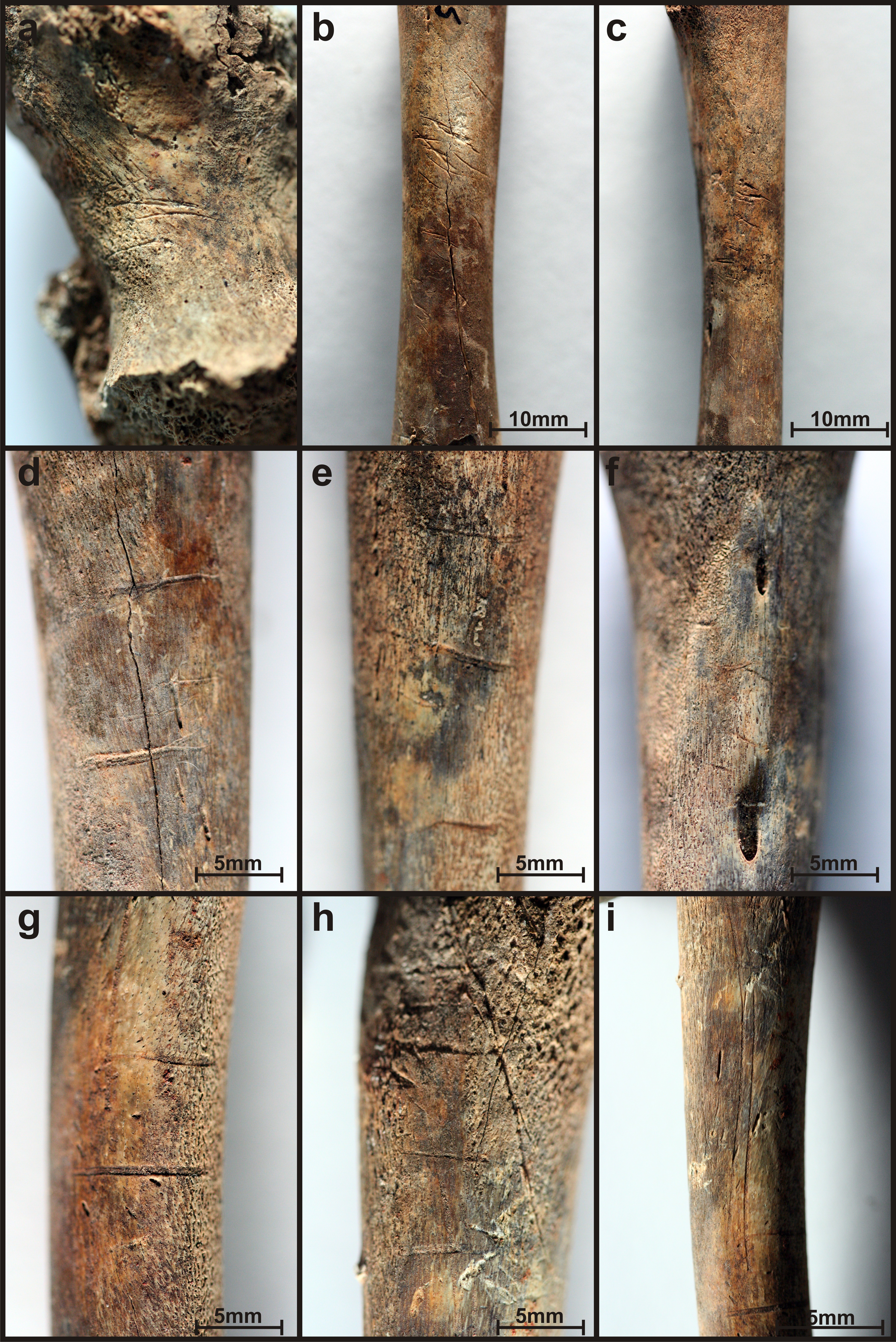
Burial 14 - Several long bones displayed incisions (defleshing marks?)

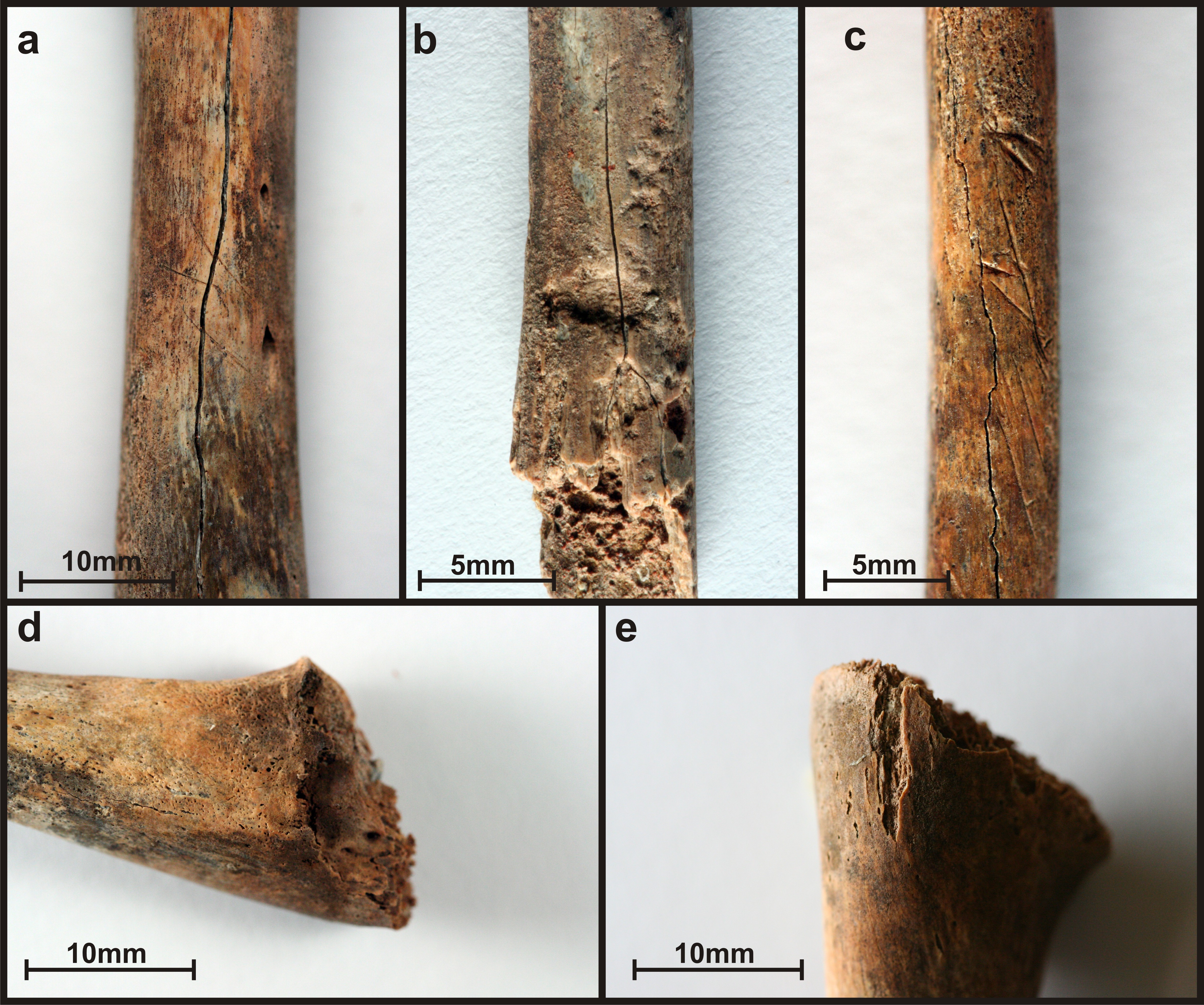
Burial 14 - Chopp marks, transversal fractures and bone detachment.
Lapa do Santo - Burial 17

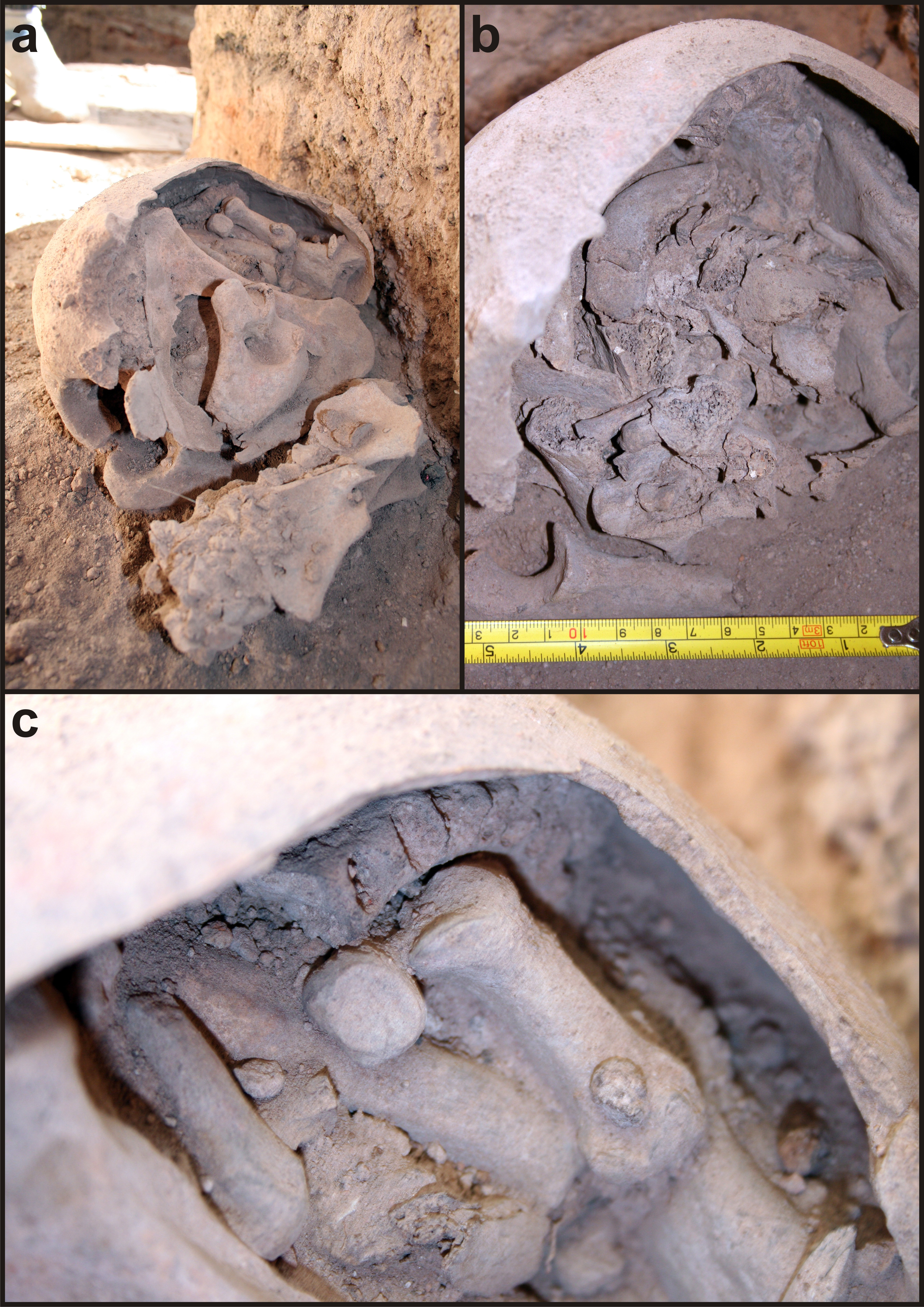
Burial 17 - Adult cranium used as receptacle for chopped burnt bones and child bones deposited next to it.

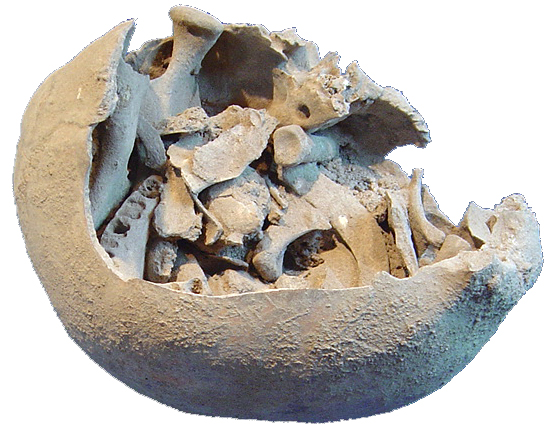
Burial 17 - Cranium used as funerary receptacle.

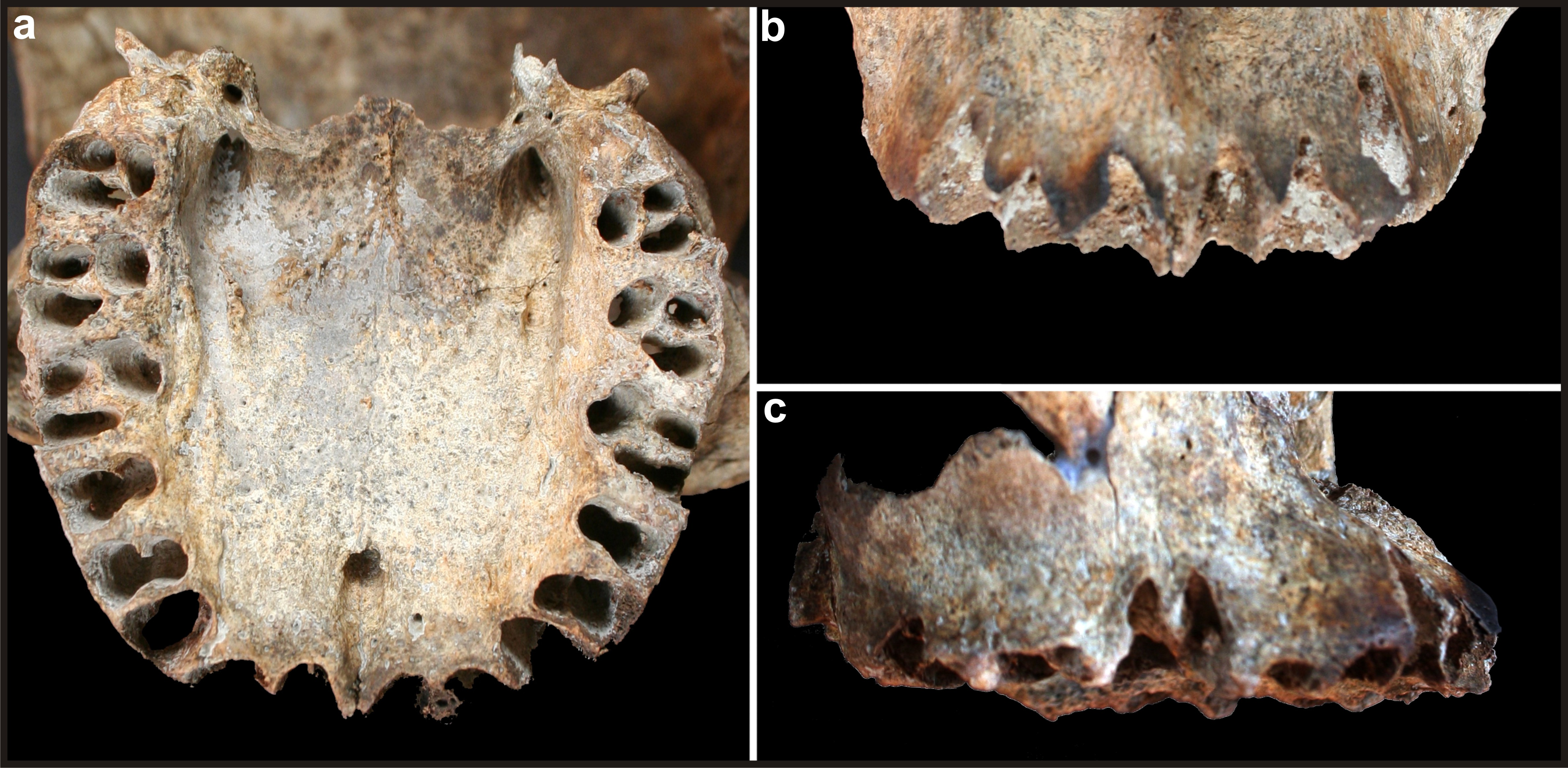
Burial 17 - The maxilla was within the skullcap. Teeth were intentionally removed and burnt marks are limited to the alveolar margin.

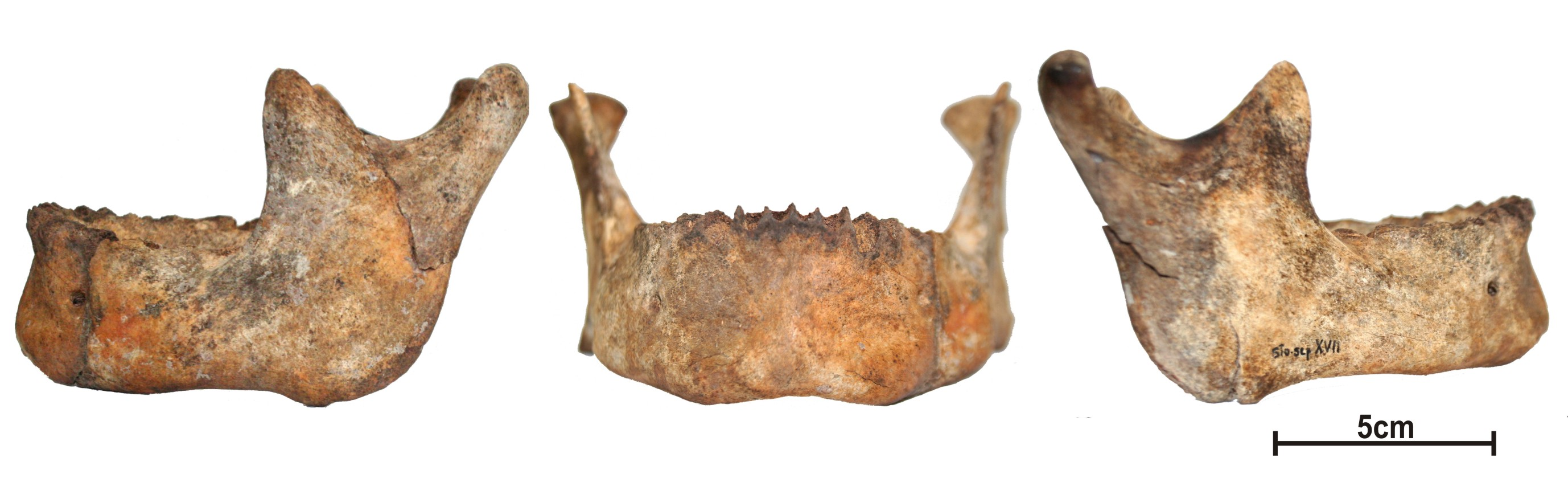
Burial 17 - The mandiblewas within the skullcap. Teeth were intentionally removed and burnt marks are limited to the alveolar margin.

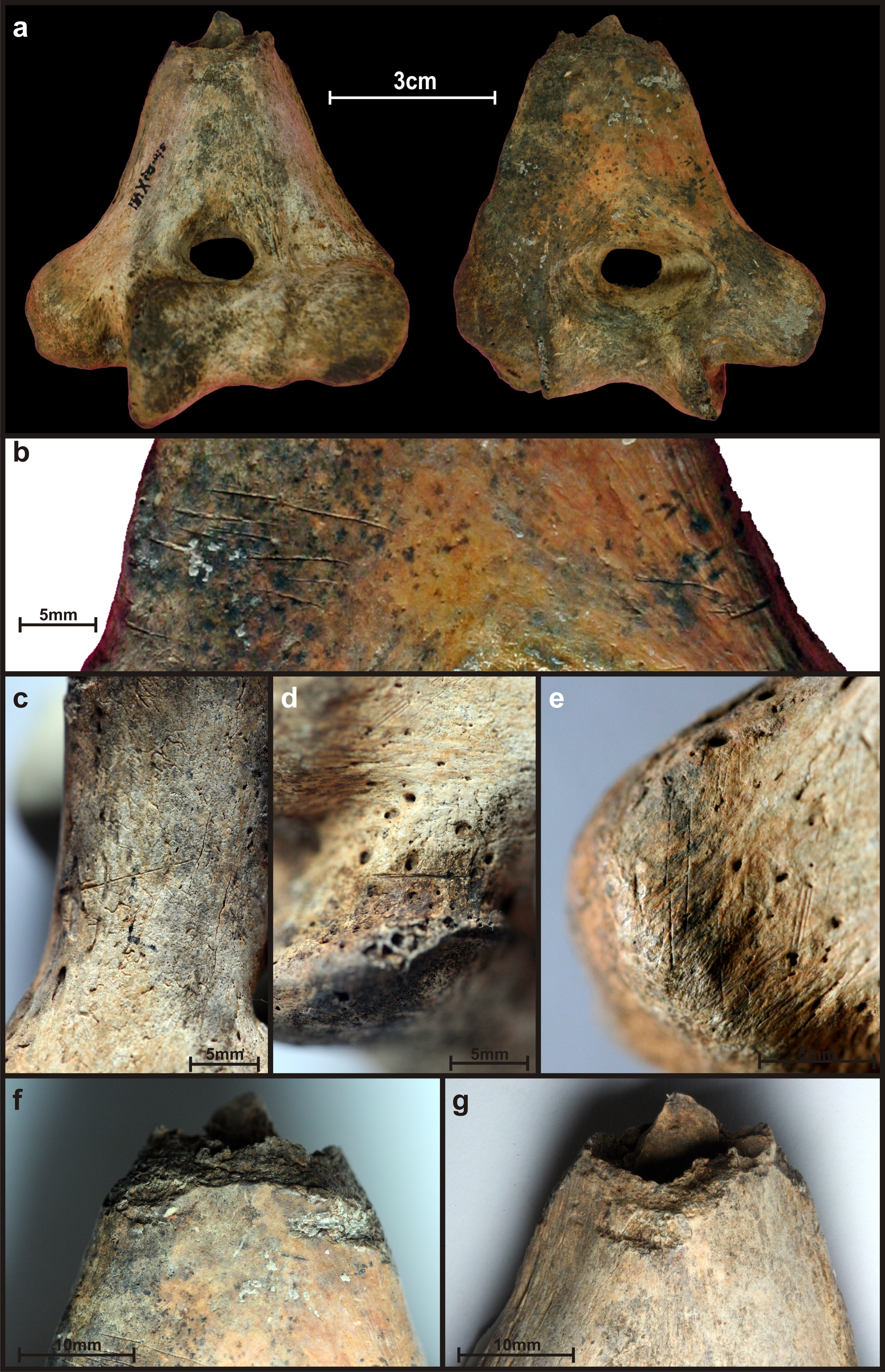
Burial 17 - Sectioned distal extremity of left humerus that was within the adult cranium. Note defleshing and chop marks.

Burial 17 - Sectioned distal extremity of left humerus 3D.

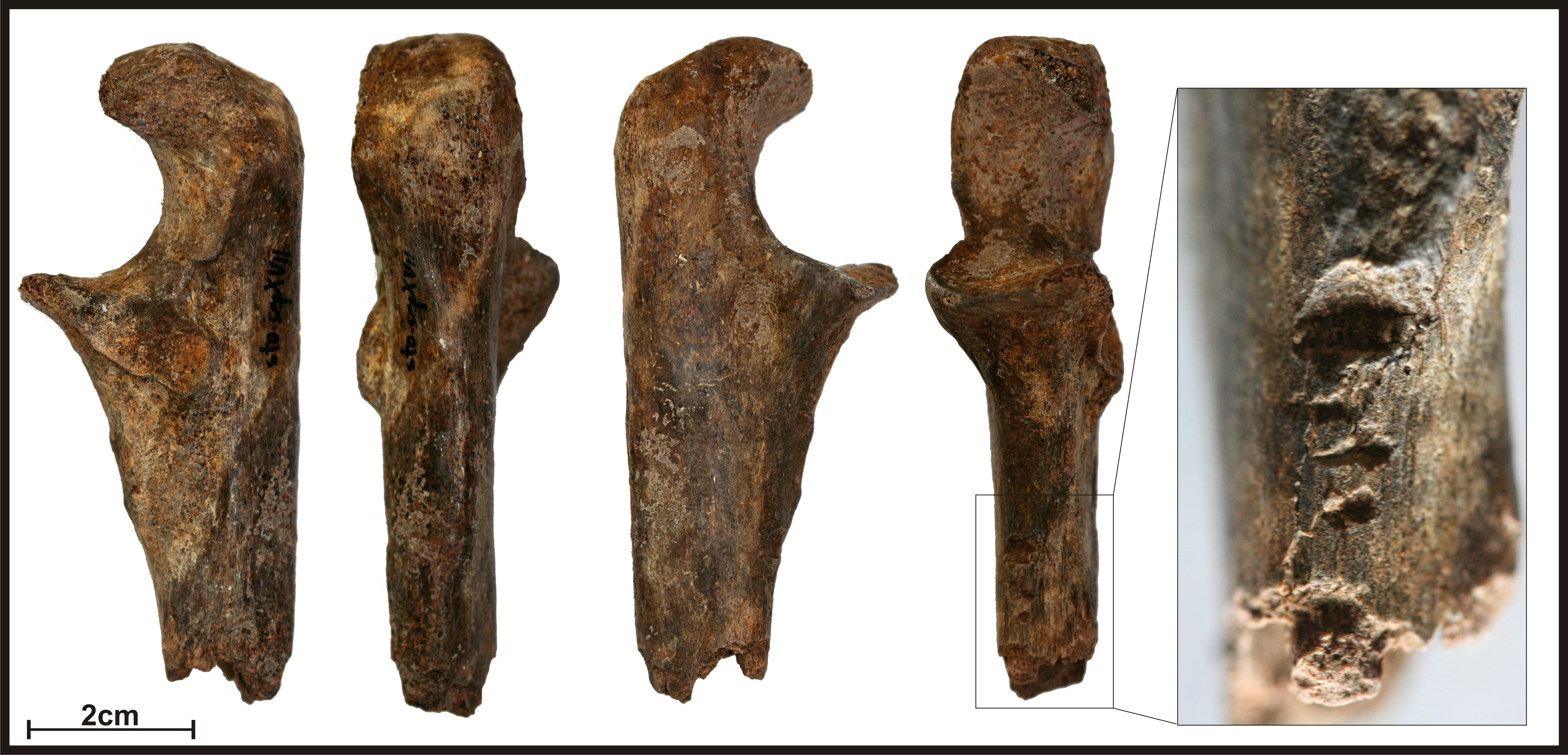
Burial 17 - Sectioned proximal extremity of left ulna that was within the adult cranium. Note chopp marks.

Burial 17 - Sectioned proximal extremity of left ulna - 3D

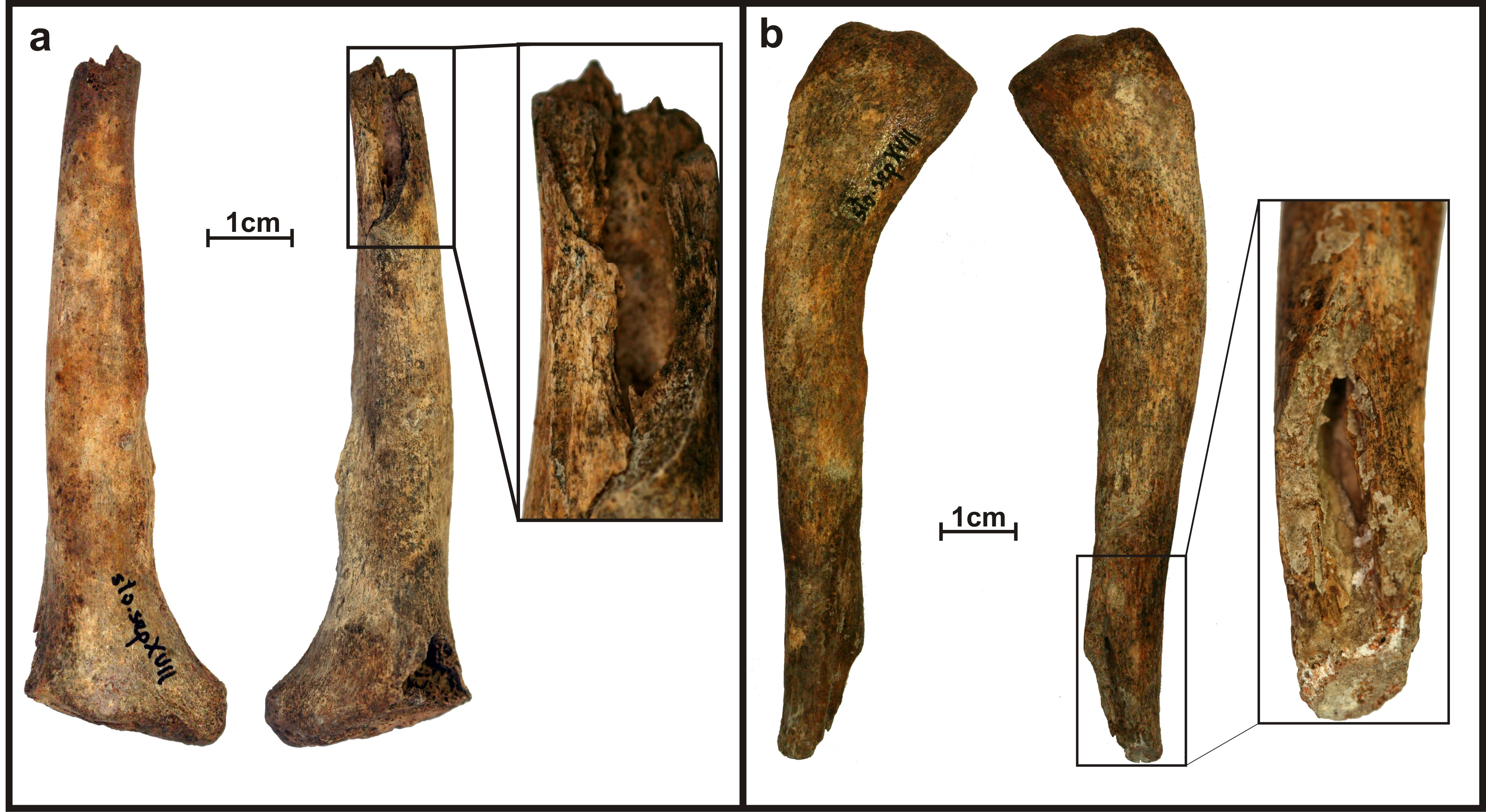
Burial 17 - Adult clavlicles with perimortem fractures that were deposited within the adult cranium.

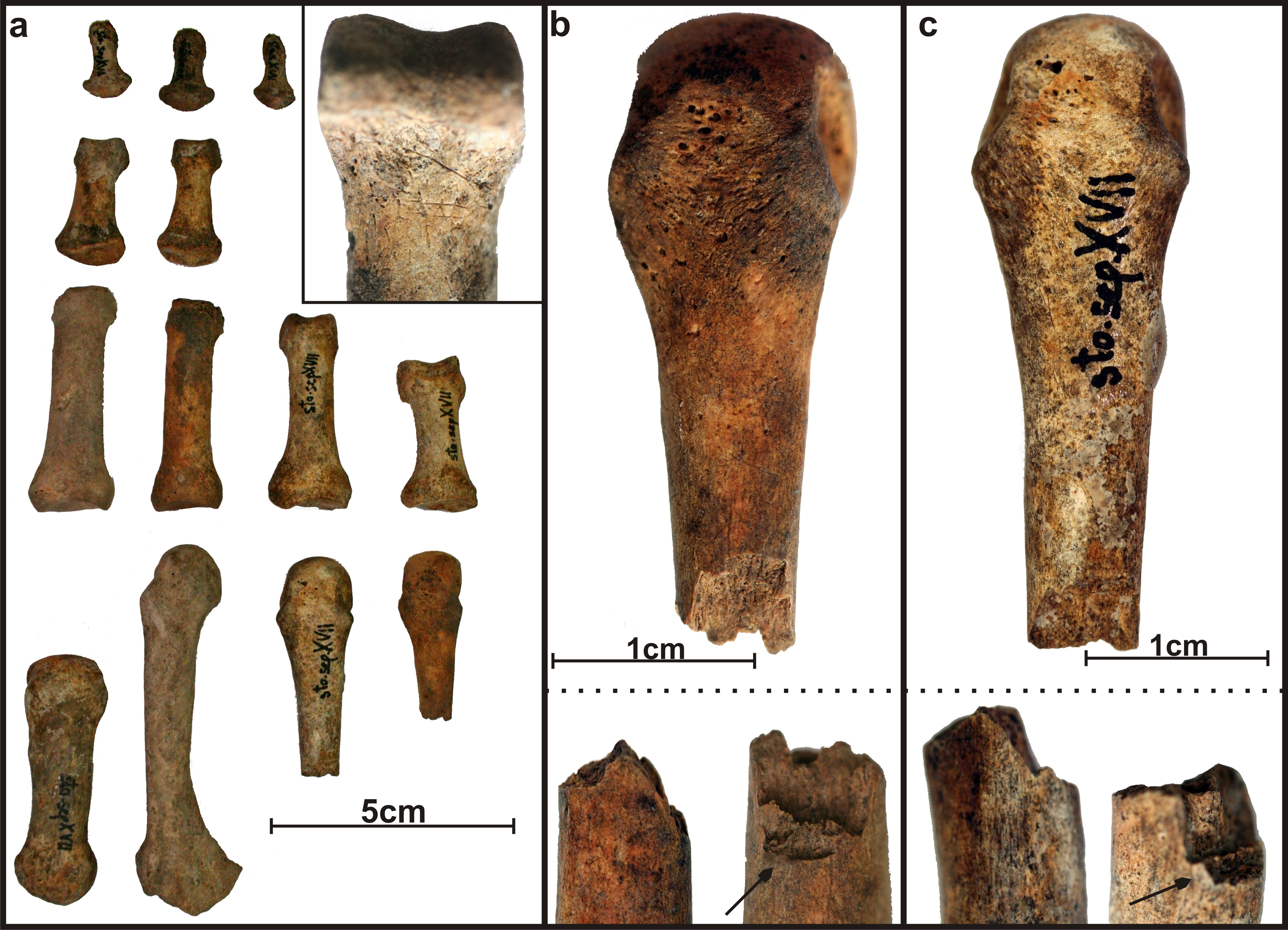
Burial 17 - Hand bones that were within the adult cranium. Possible perimortem fracture and bite marks.

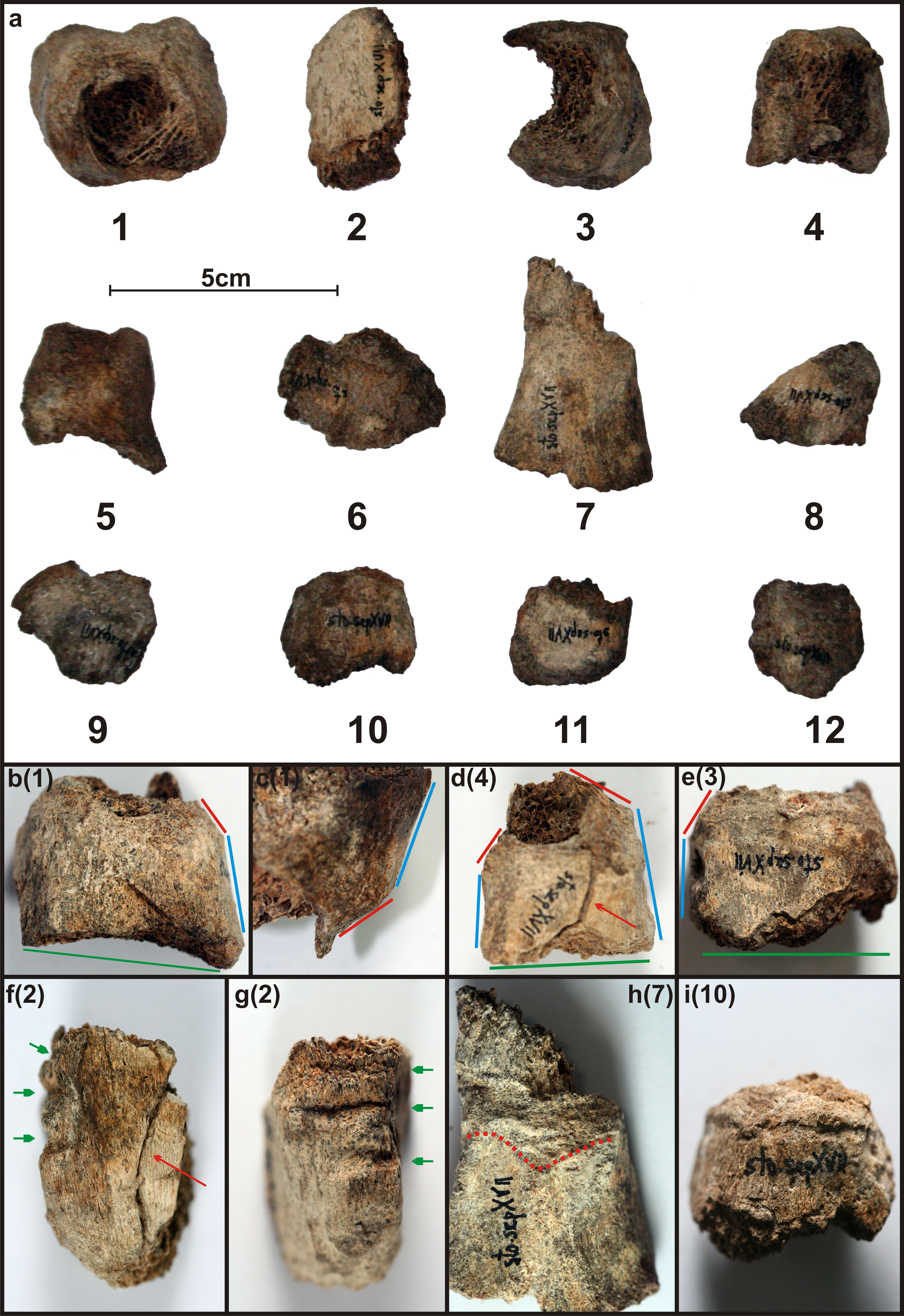
Burial 17 - Chopped and burnt fragments of long bones were deposited within the cranium.

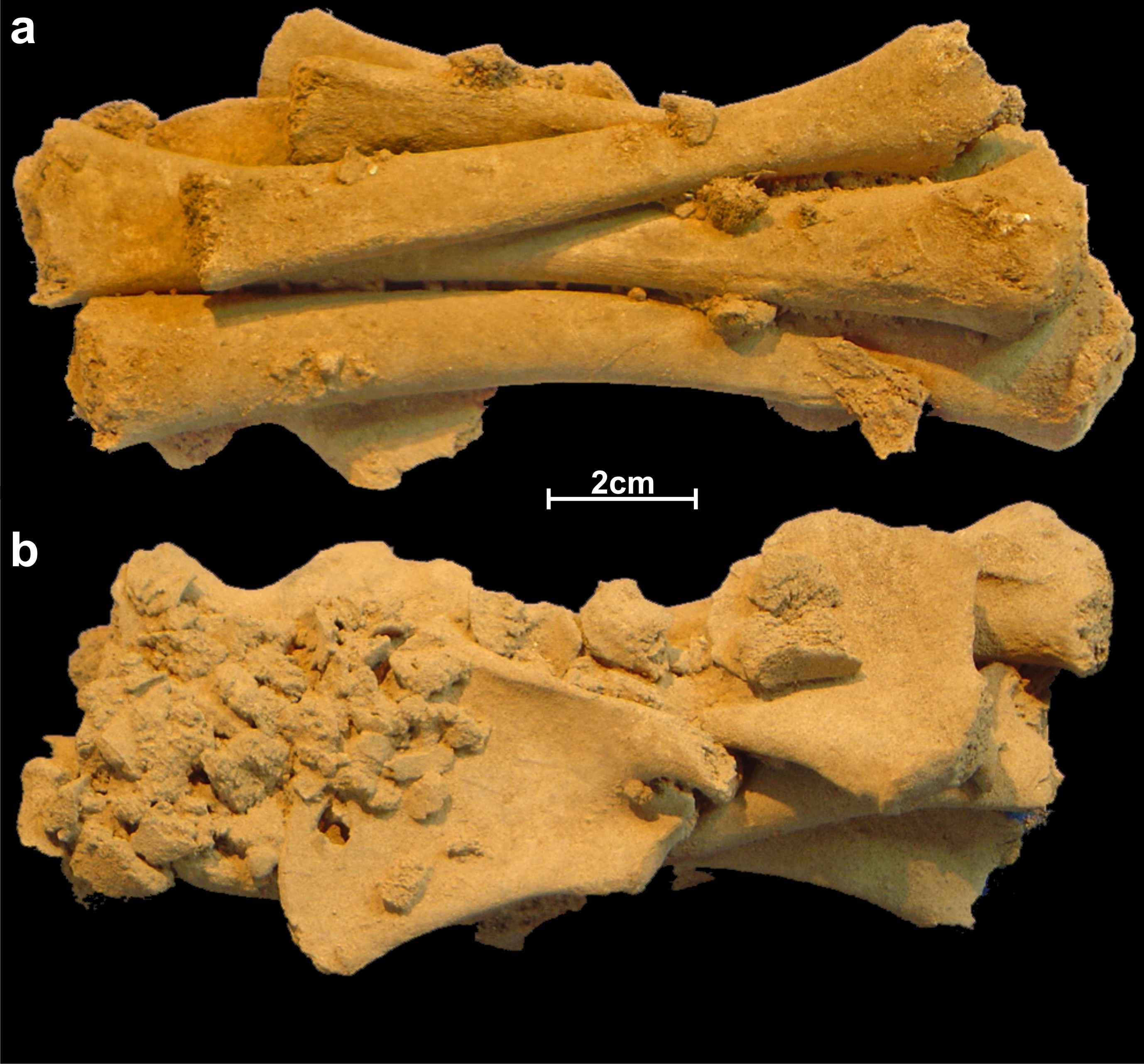
Burial 17 - Anterior and posterior view of bundle of post-cranial child bones that was deposited next to the adult cranium.

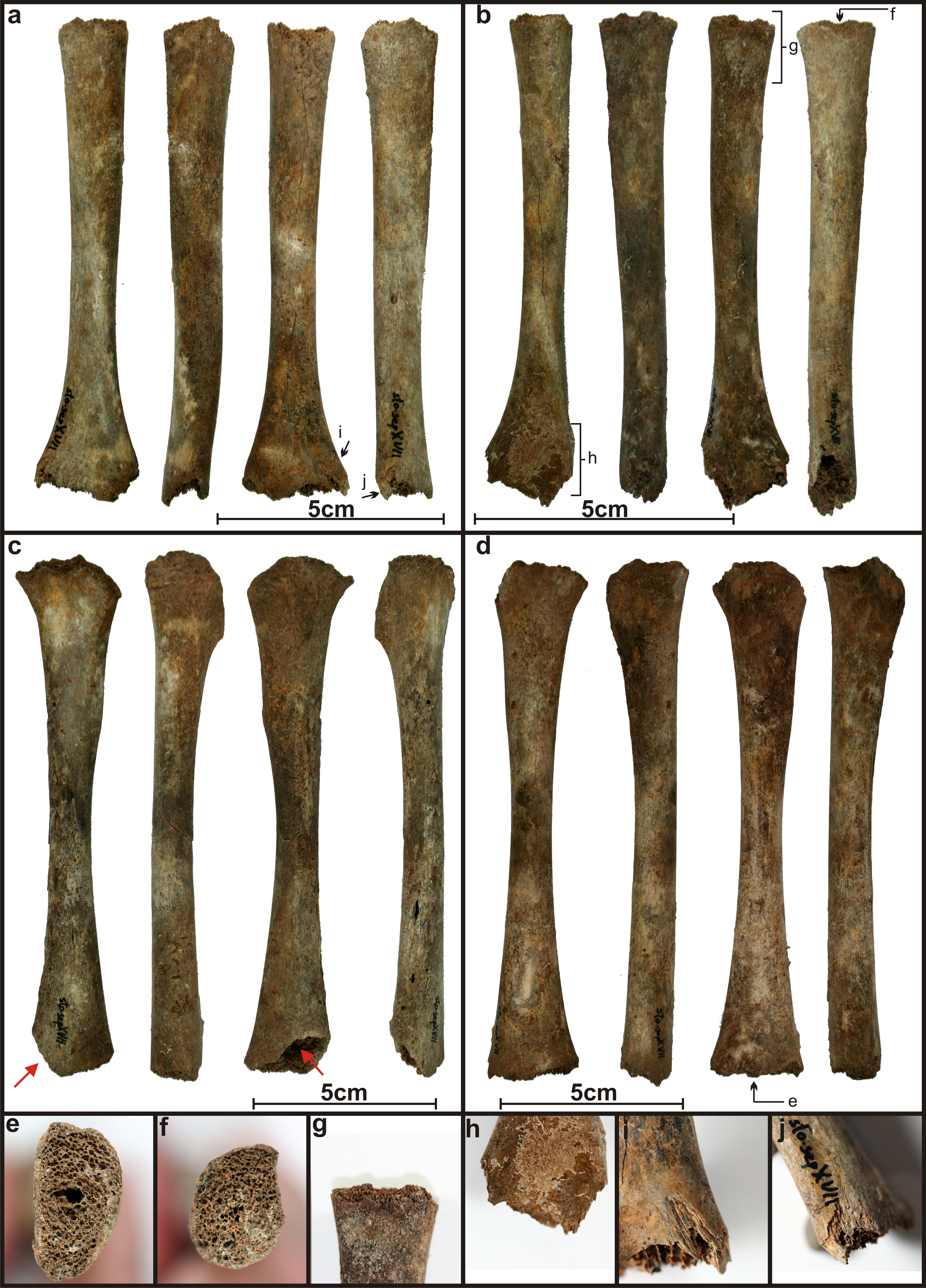
Burial 17 - Long bones of a child with chopped extremities that was part of the bundle deposited next to the adult cranium.

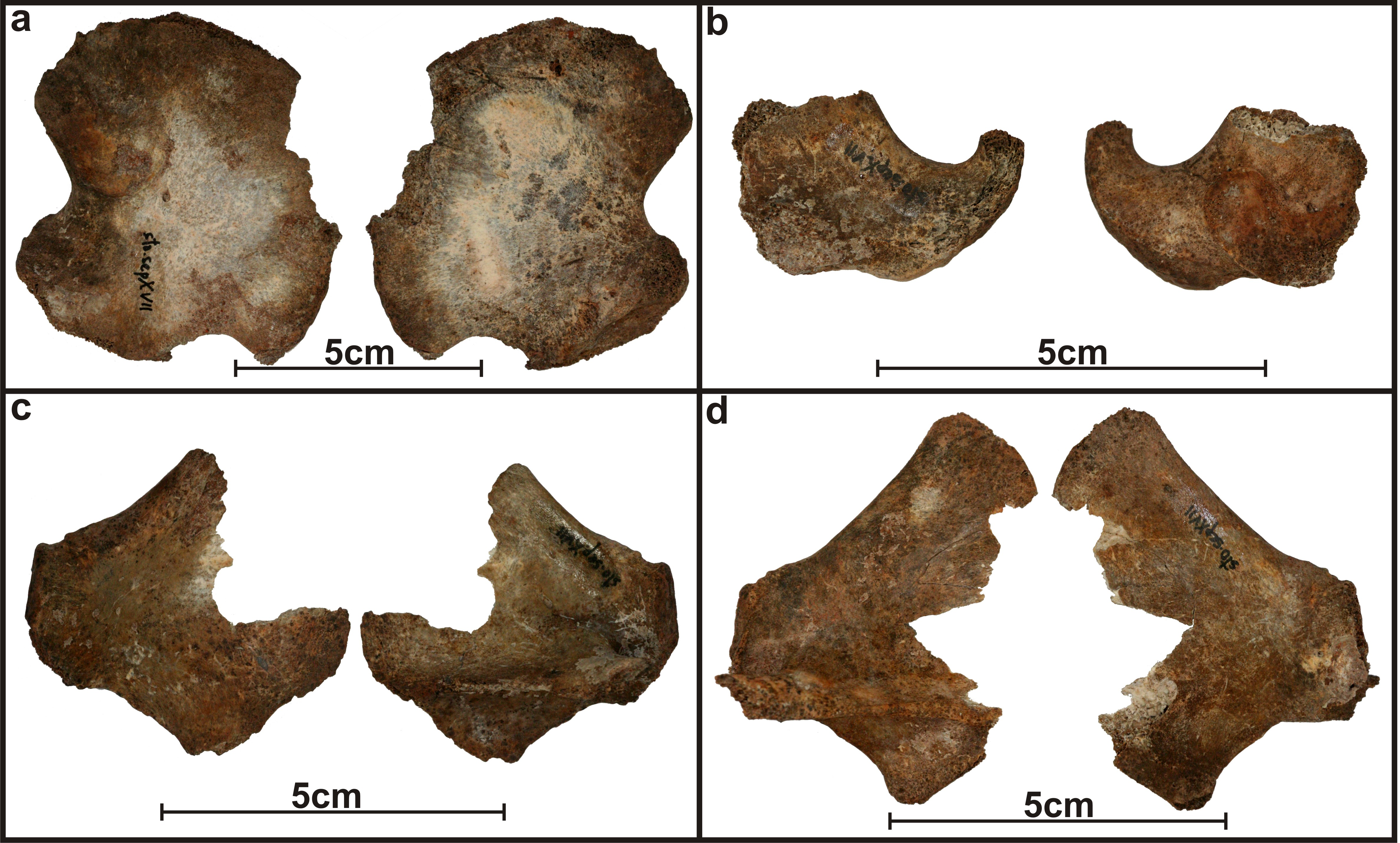
Burial 17 - Pelvis and scapulas that were part of the bundle deposited next to the adult cranium,
Lapa do Santo - Burial 18

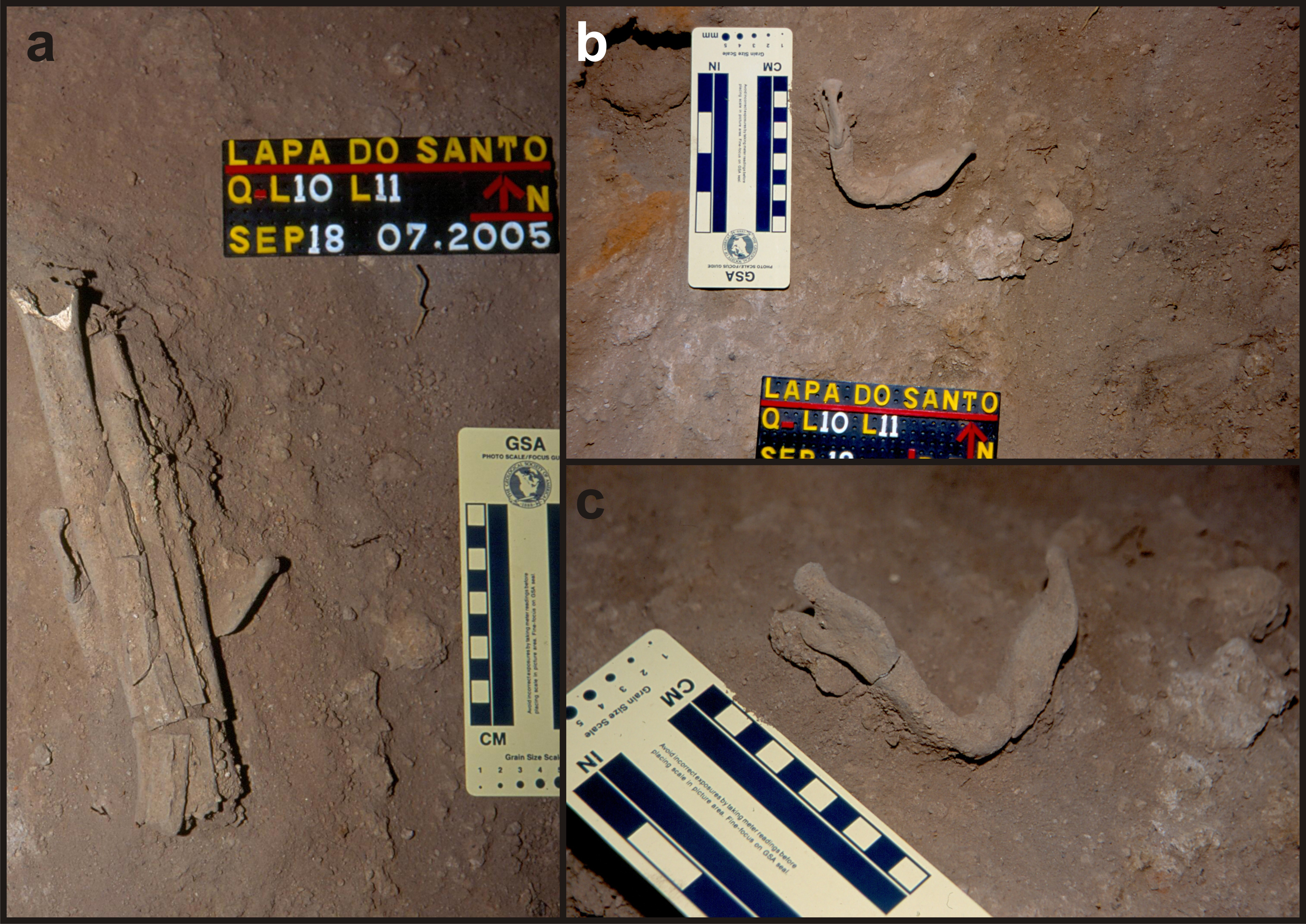
Burial 18 - Bundle of adult chopped long bones and child mandible

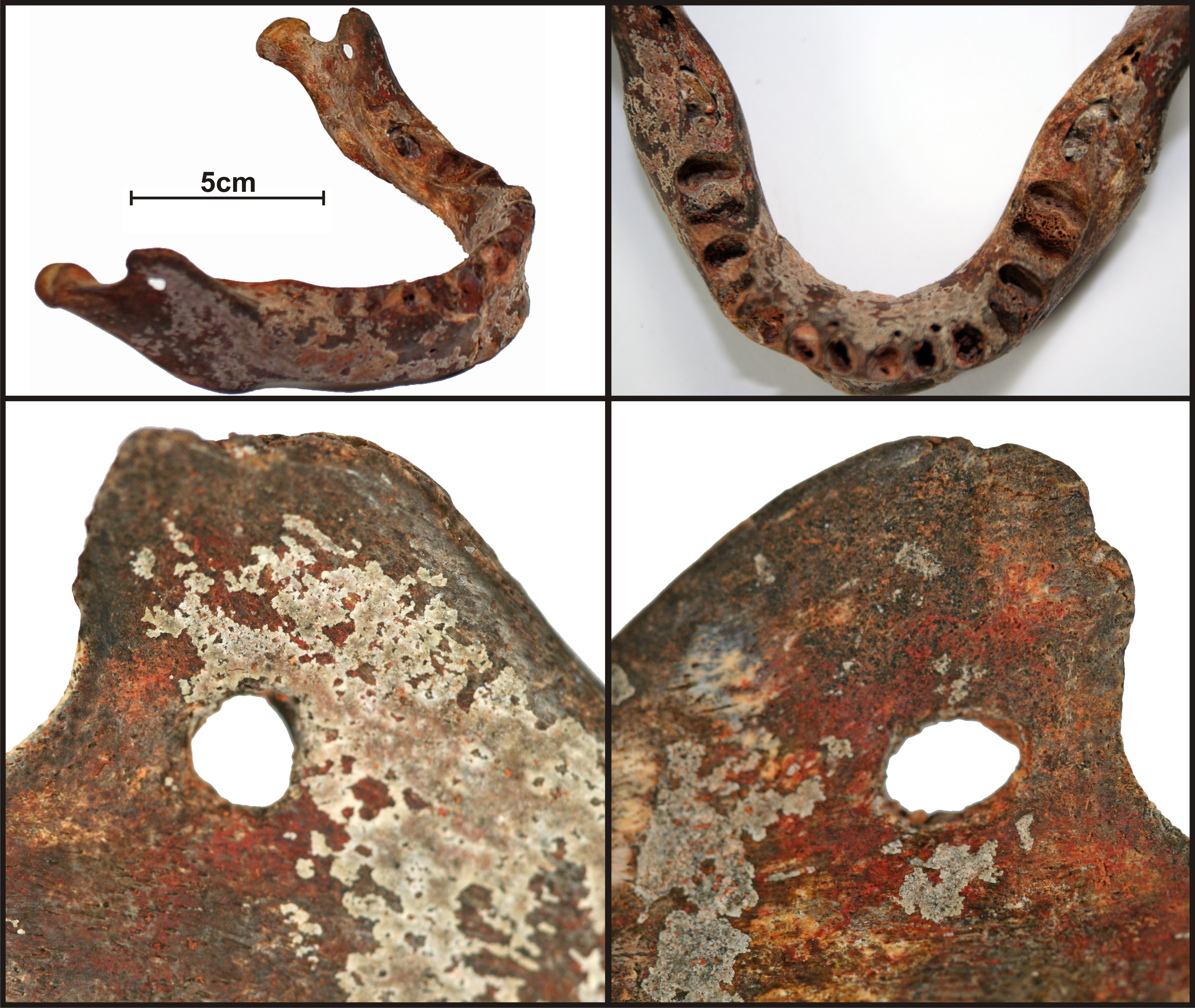
Burial 18 - Child mandible. Teeth removed and drill perforated

Burial 18 - Child mandible. 3D

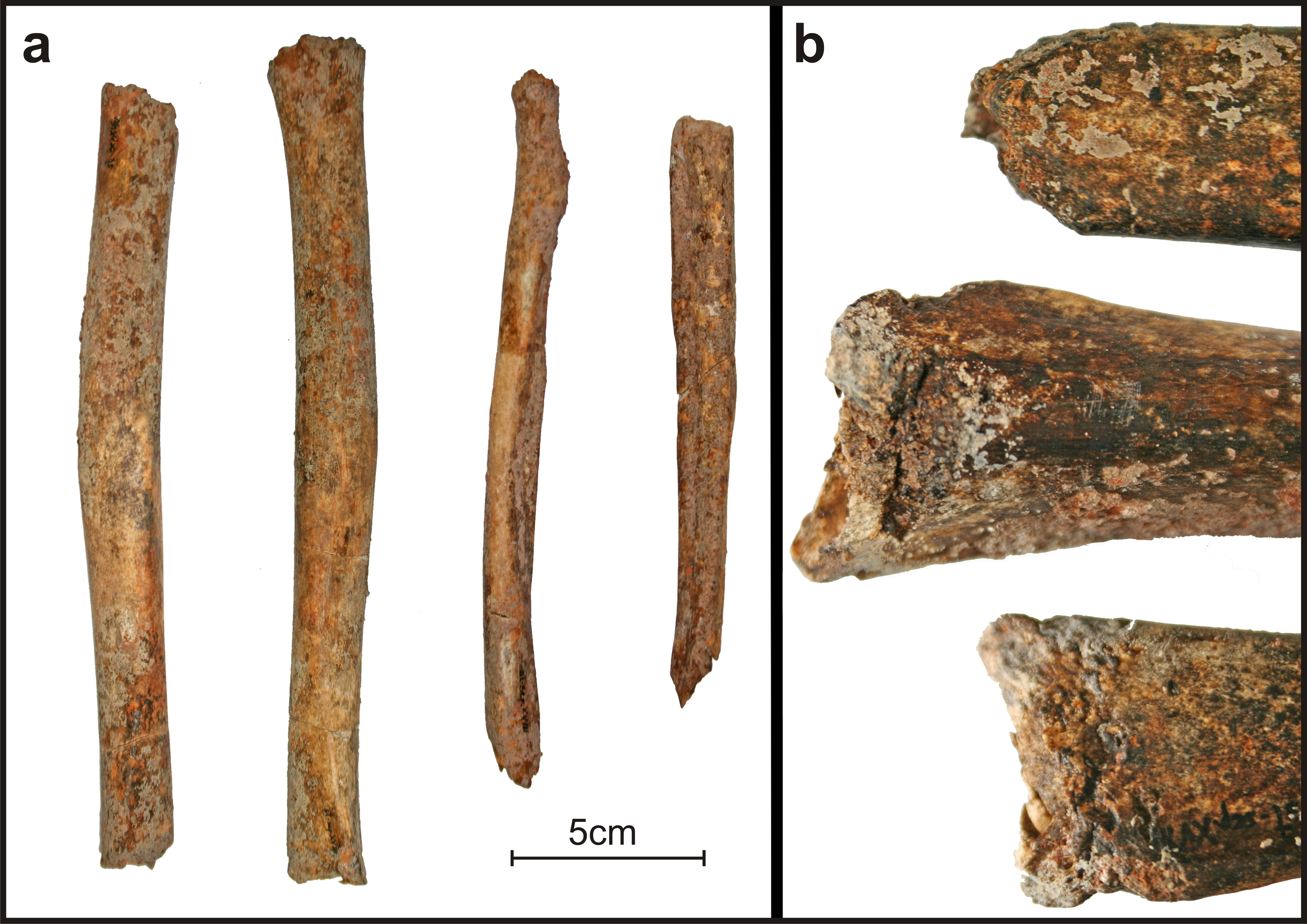
Burial 18 - Long bones had their extremities chopped off.

Burial 18 - Right humerus diaphysis. 3D.

Burial 18 - Left ulna diaphysis.

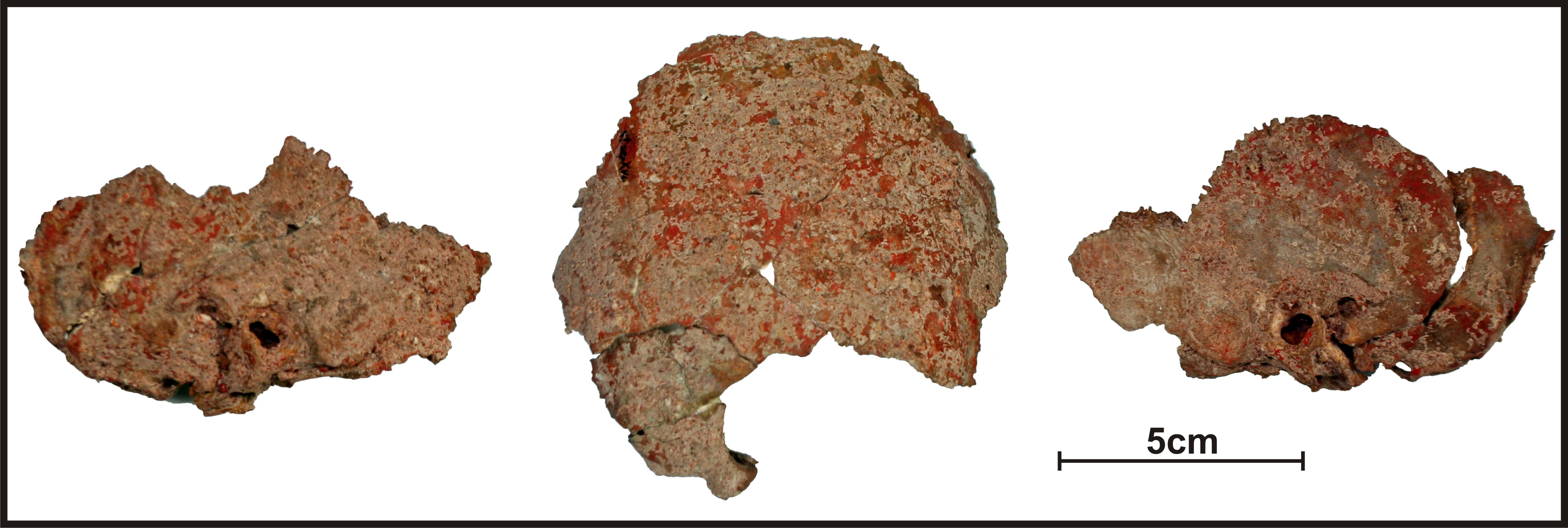
Burial 18 - Parts of the cranium were located near by.
Lapa do Santo - Burial 23

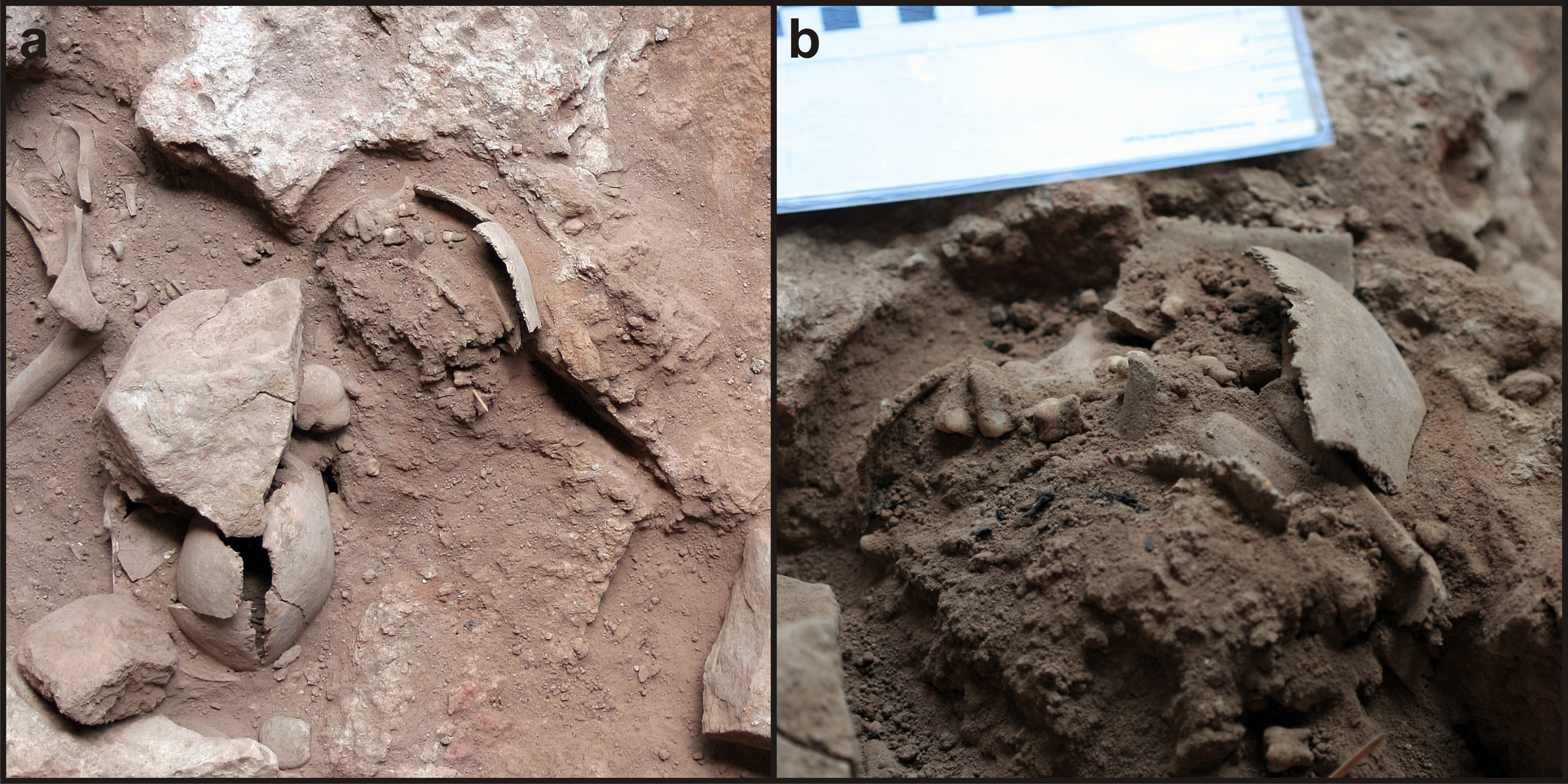
Burial 23 - A child's skullcap filled with 74 teeth, which was partially disturbed by the grave of Burial 21.

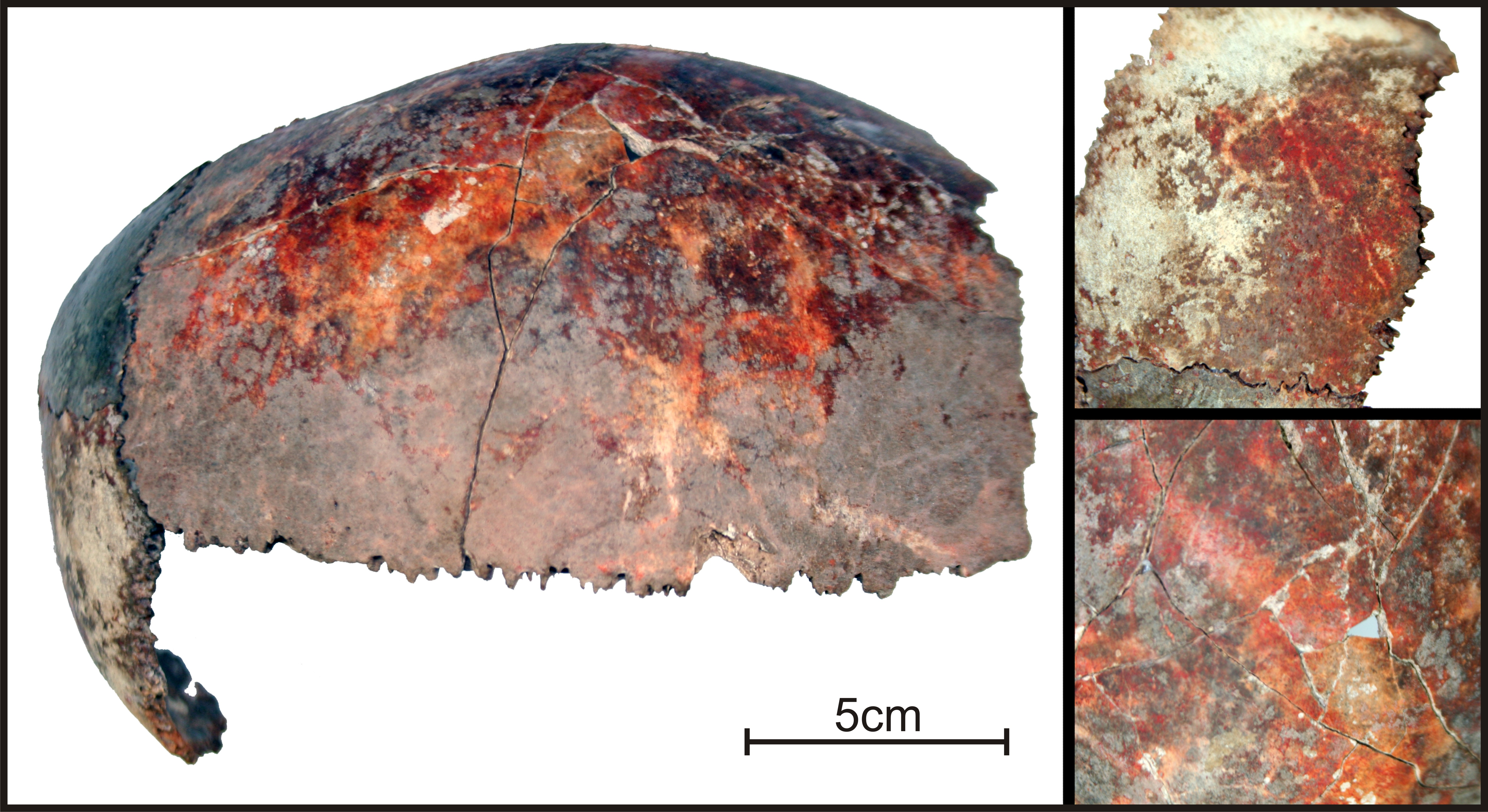
Burial 23 - The skullcap was painted red and used as funerary receptacle.

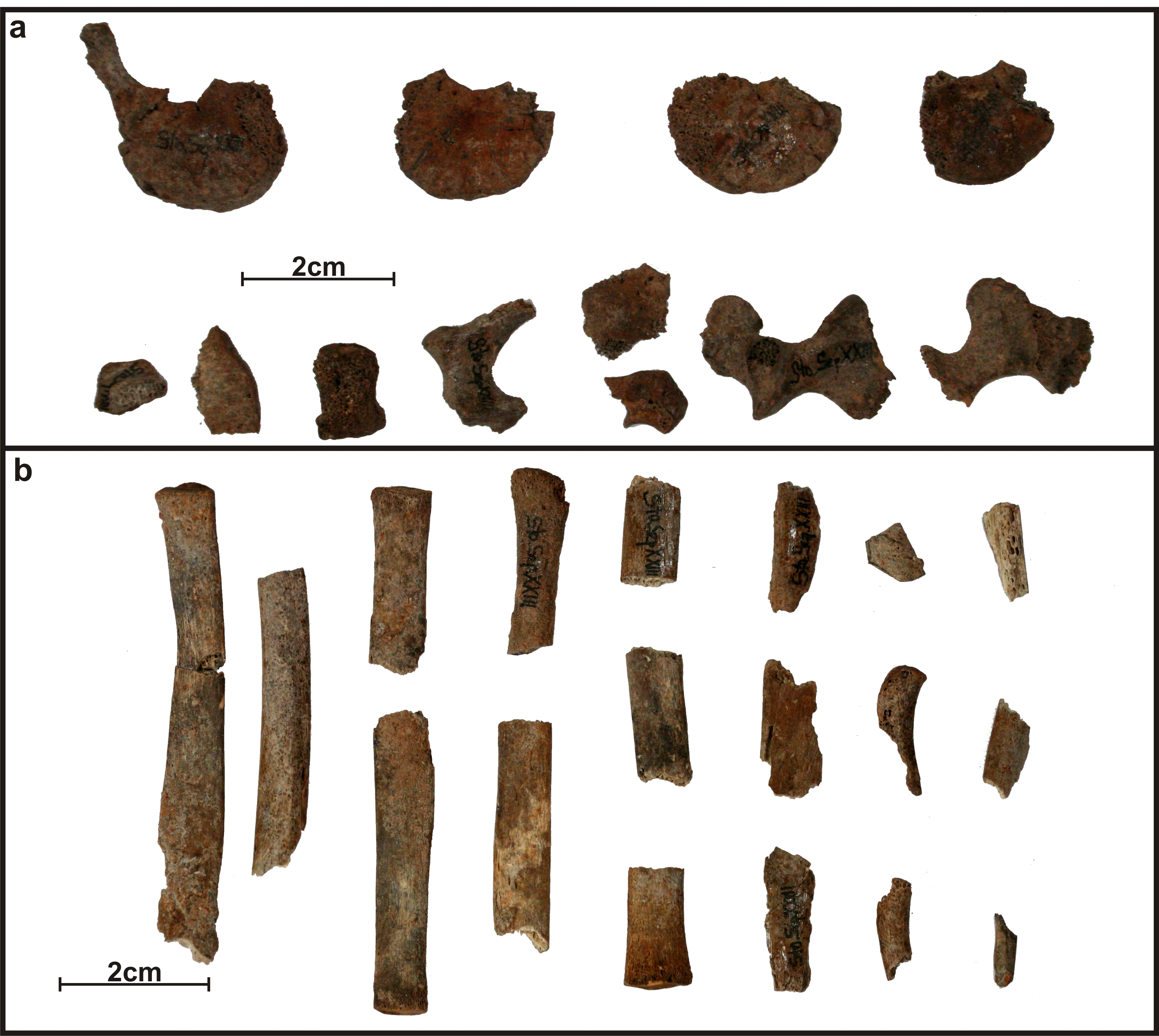
Burial 23 - Vertebrae and ribas were also within the skullcap.

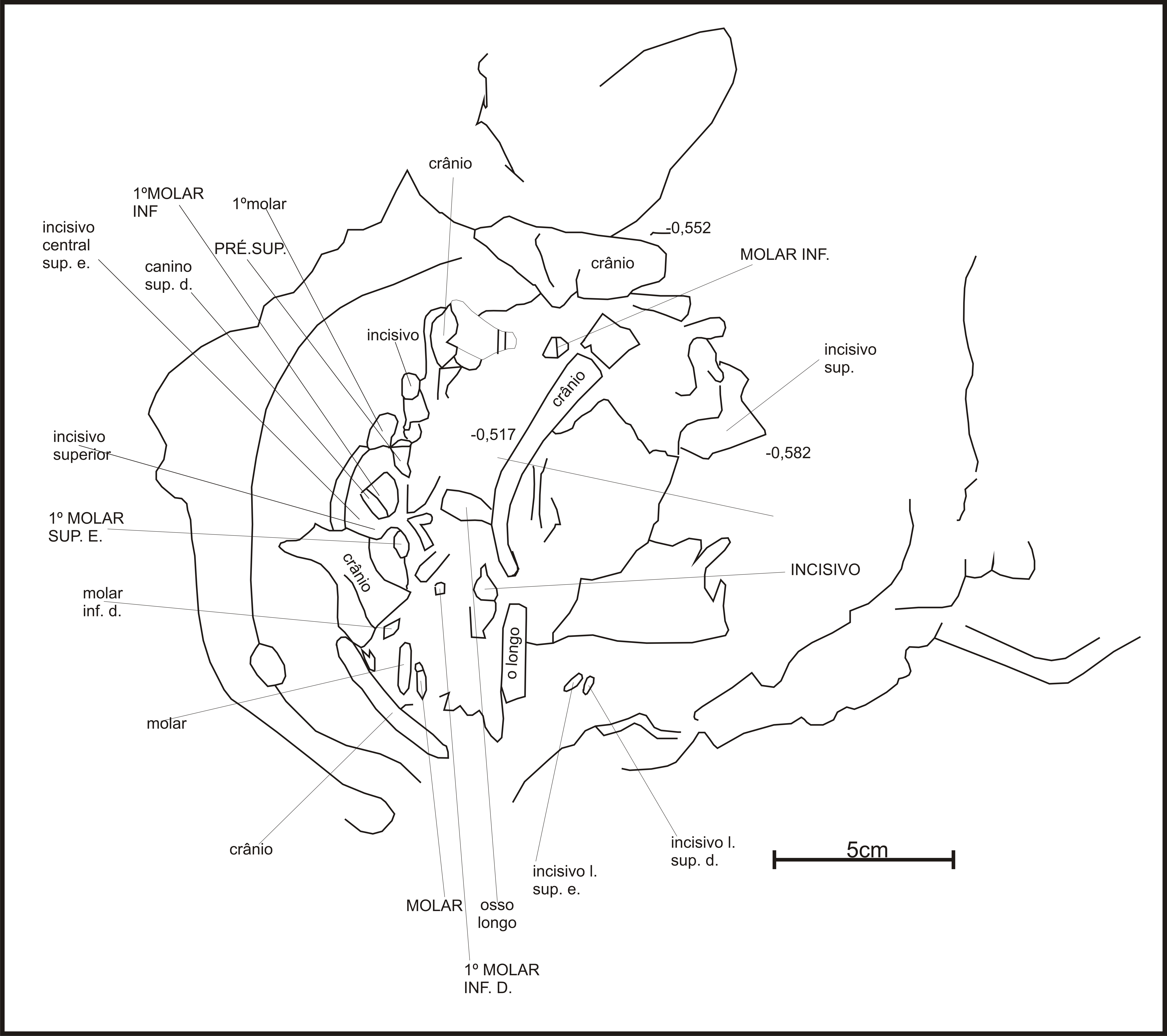
Burial 23 - Spatial distribution of the teeth within the skullcap (exposition 2)

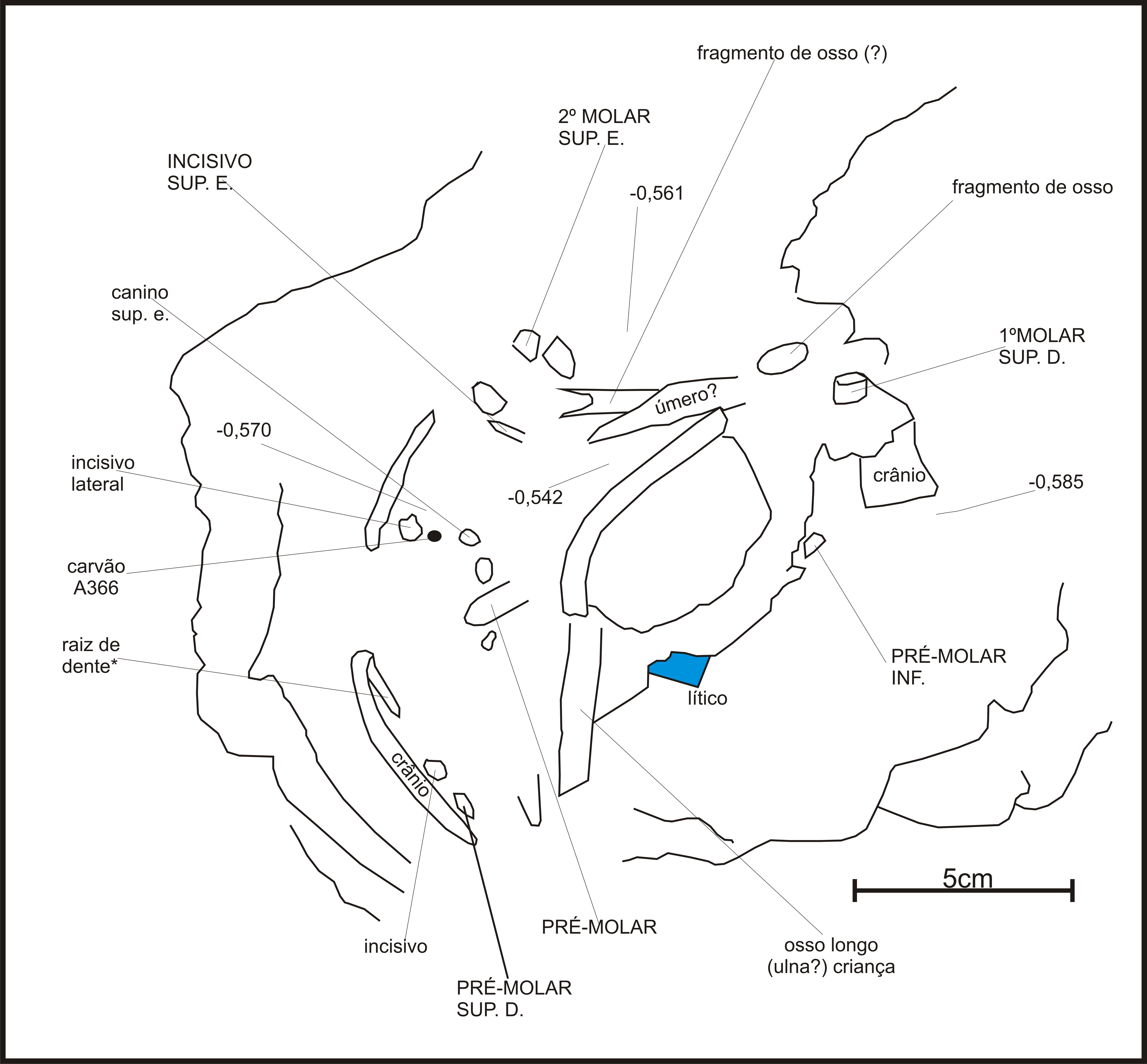
Burial 23 - Spatial distribution of the teeth within the skullcap (exposition 3)

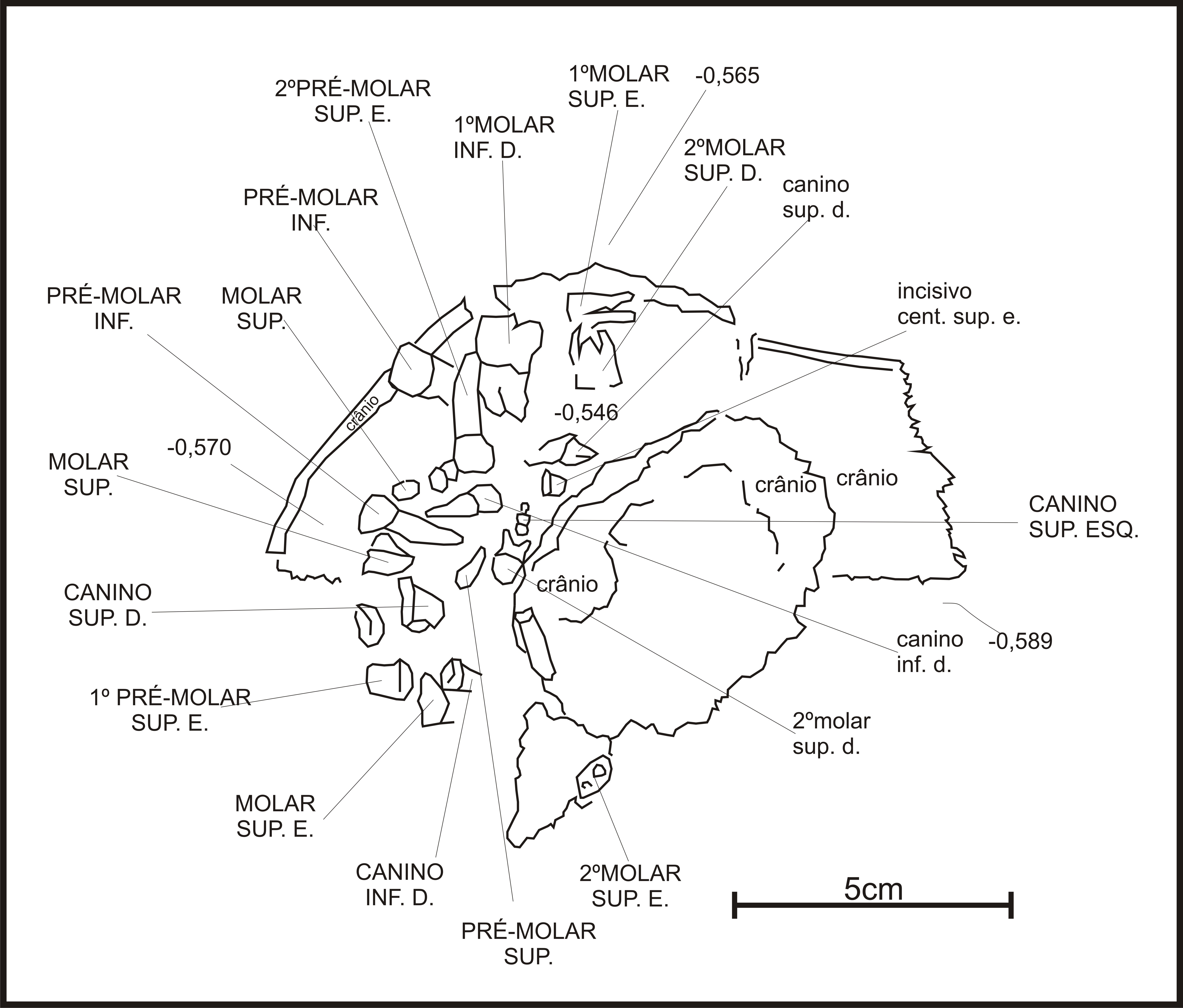
Burial 23 - Spatial distribution of the teeth within the skullcap (exposition 4)

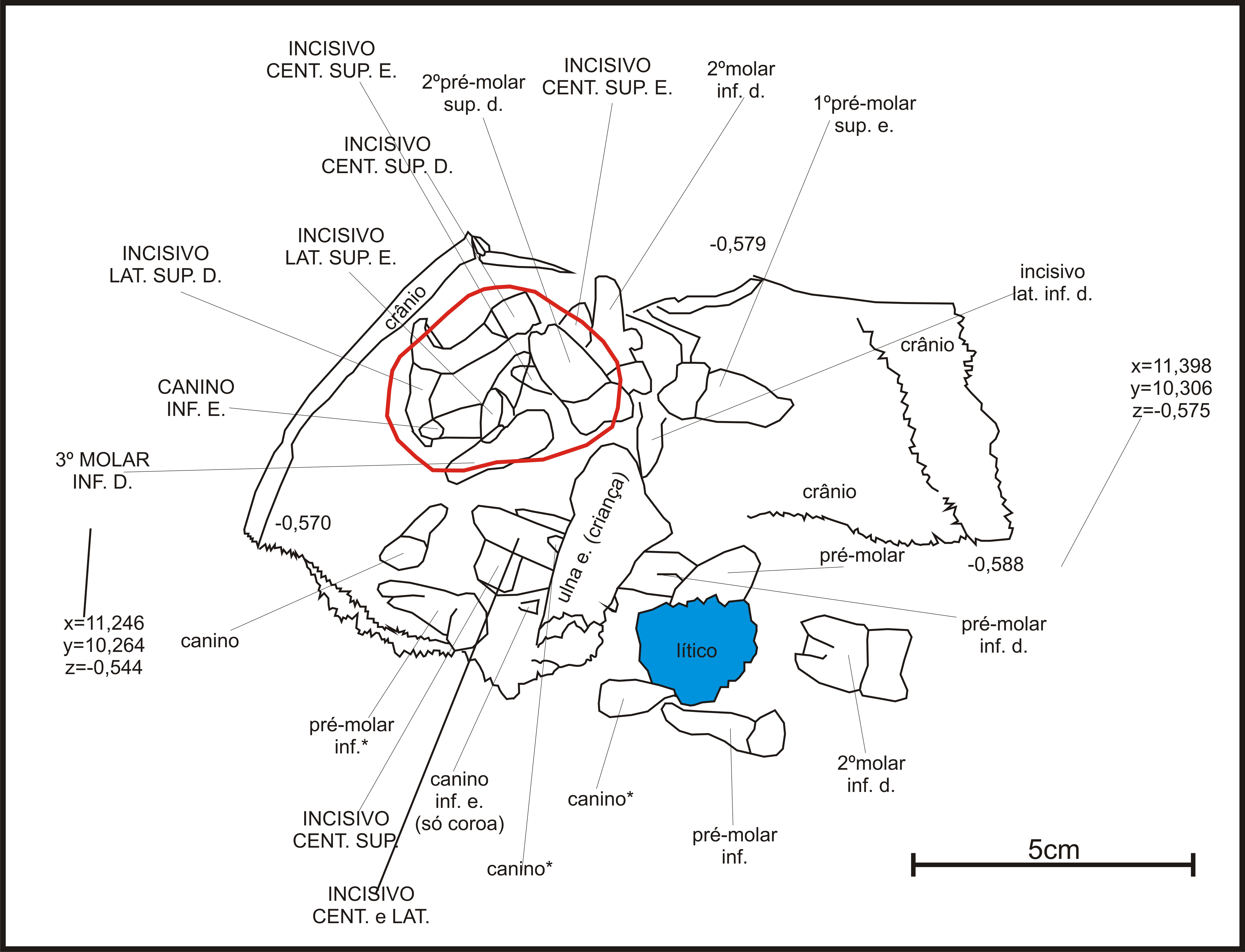
Burial 23 - Spatial distribution of the teeth within the skullcap (exposition 5)

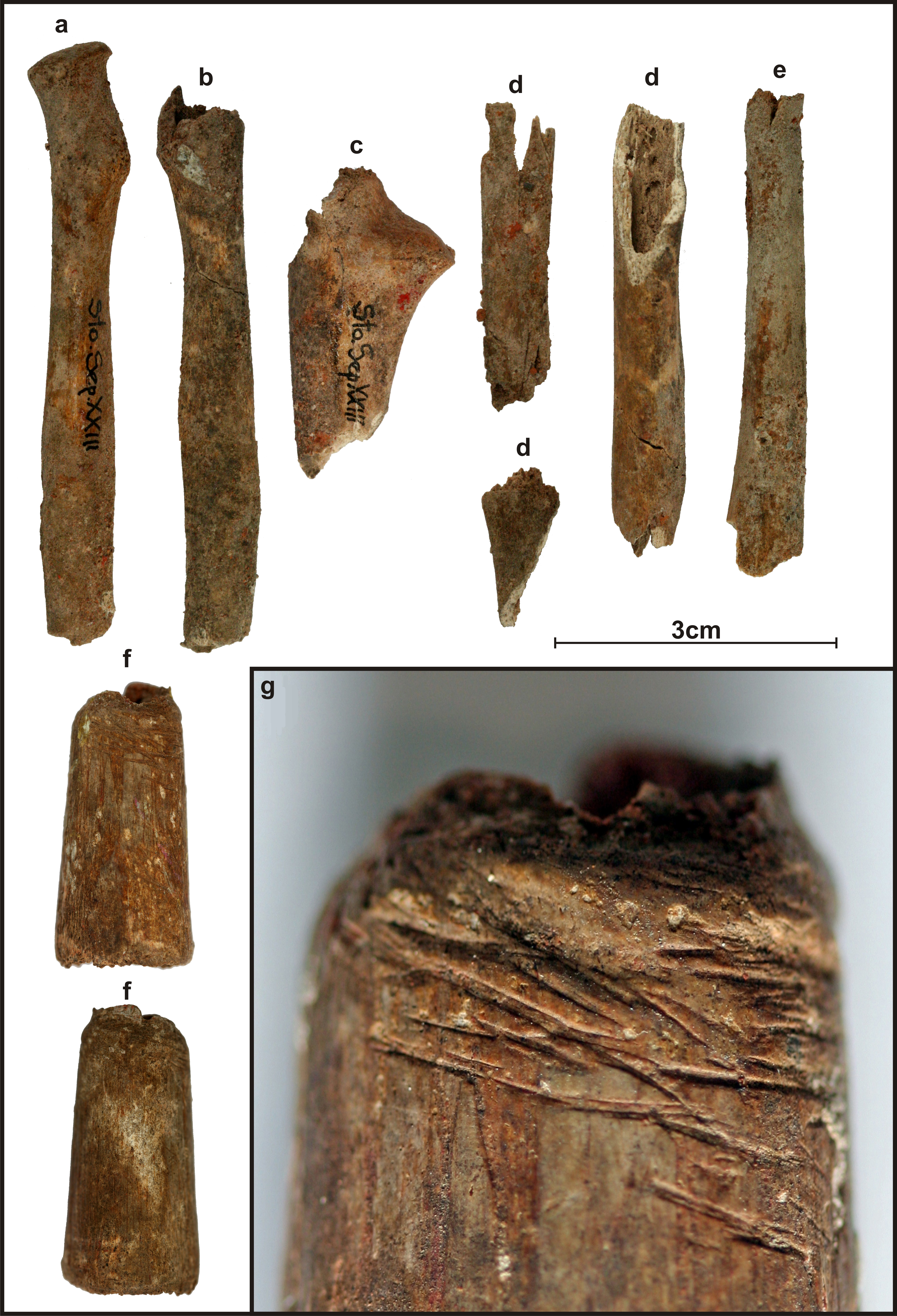
Burial 23 - Chopp human long bones were also present.
Lapa do Santo - Isolated bones

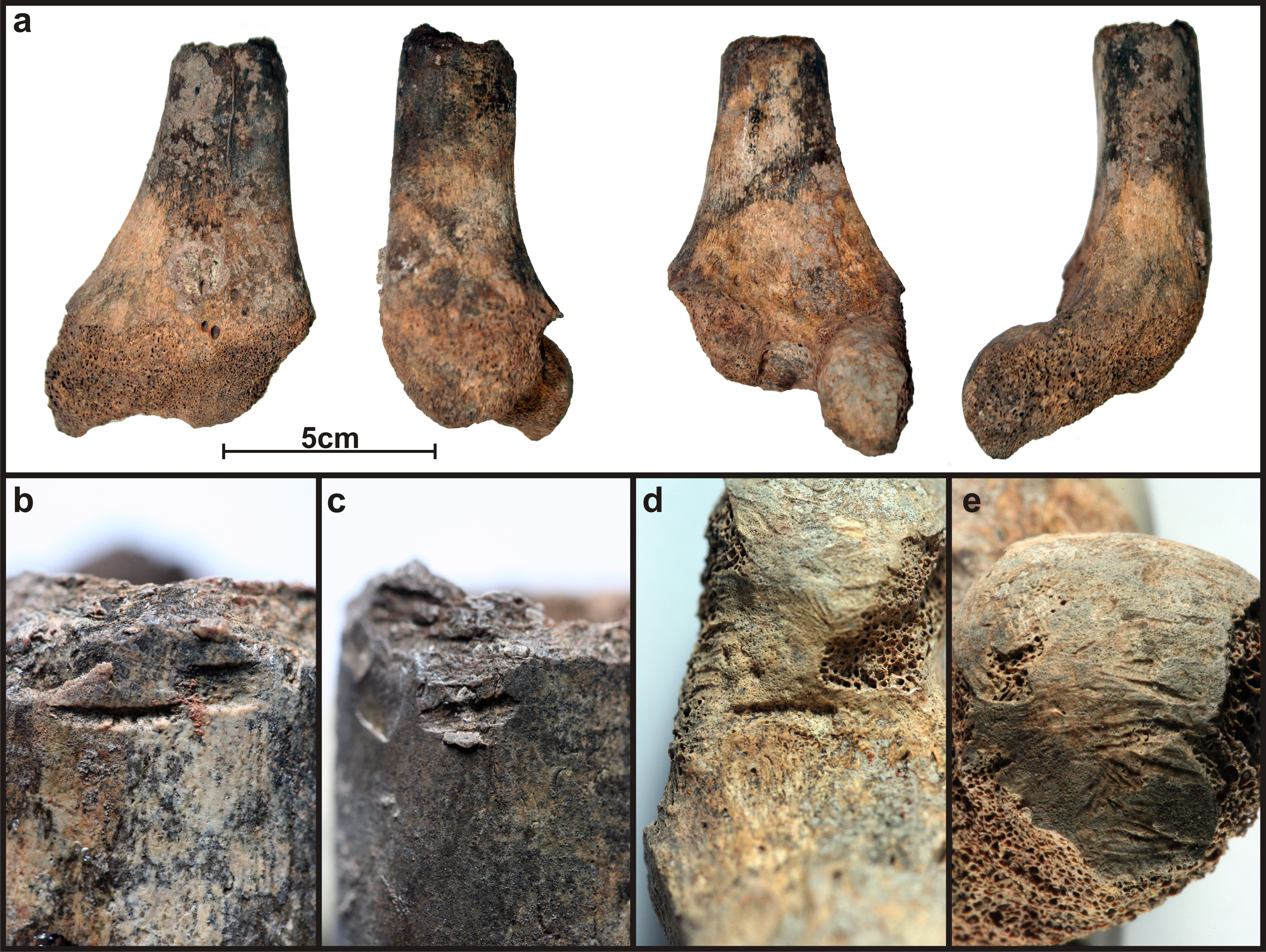
Isolated bone (PN3083) - Chopp distal femur with burning and gnawing marks

Isolated bone (PN3083) -3D

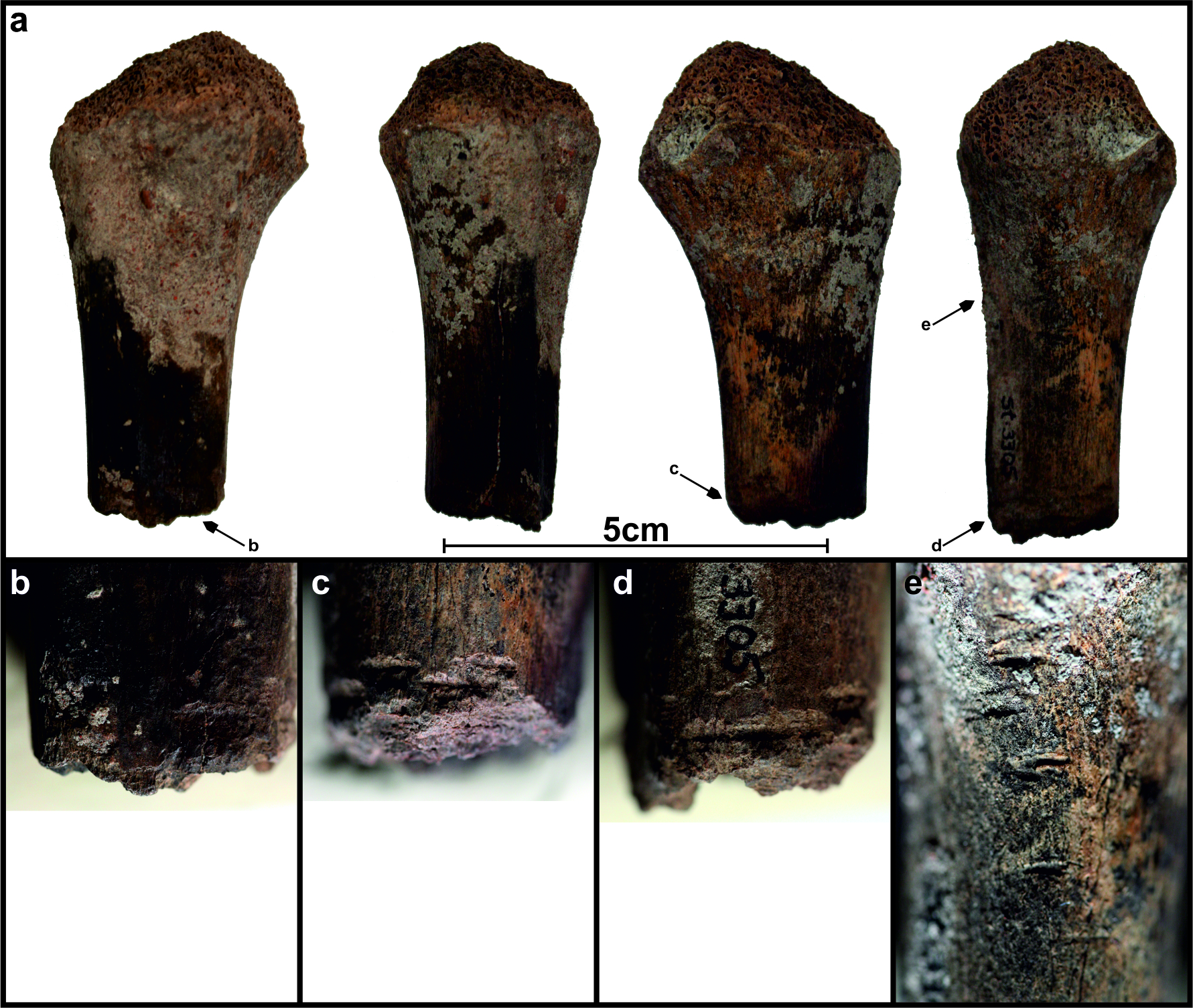
Isolated bone (PN3305) - Chopp proximal humerus with burning and gnawing marks.

Isolated bone (PN3305) - 3D

=== Lapa do Santo Mortuary Pattern 3 ===
Lapa do Santo Mortuary Pattern 3 (LSMP-3) is dated to 8.2-8.6 cal kyBP and includes nine burials: 6, 7, 10, 11, 12, 13, 15, 19 and 22. Burials are characterized by shallow circular pits completely filled with mostly disarticulated bones of single individuals of various ages and sexes. Circular stone structures covered some of the burials, but also occur independently of them. Anatomical selection was not observed and, with the exception of some small bones, most elements of the skeleton were present. The midshafts of long bones of adult individuals were in some cases intentionally broken in the central region before deposition, resulting in butterfly fractures with impact points indicating the use of some percussion instrument. The burials belonging to LSMP-3 are very similar to each other, contrasting the larger variability observed within LSMP-2. Furthermore, characteristic elements of the latter, such as cut-marks, chop-marks, absence of dentition, red pigment, and burnt marks are not present in the former.

Lapa do Santo - Burial 6

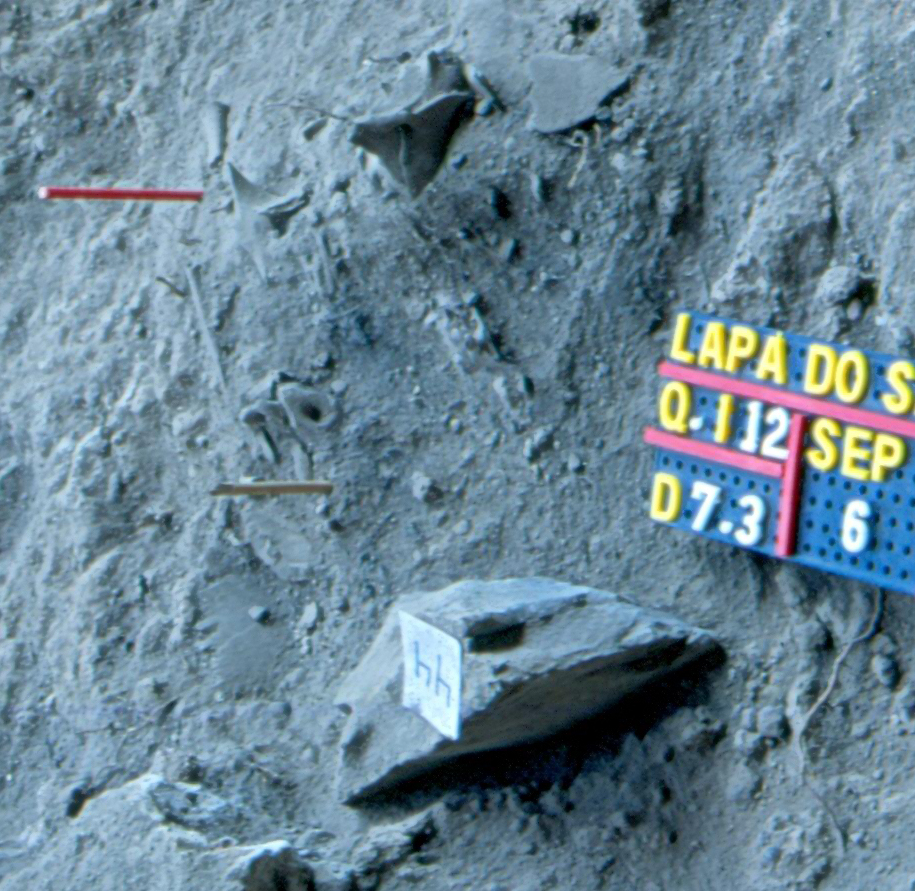
Burial 6. Excavation at exposition 1.

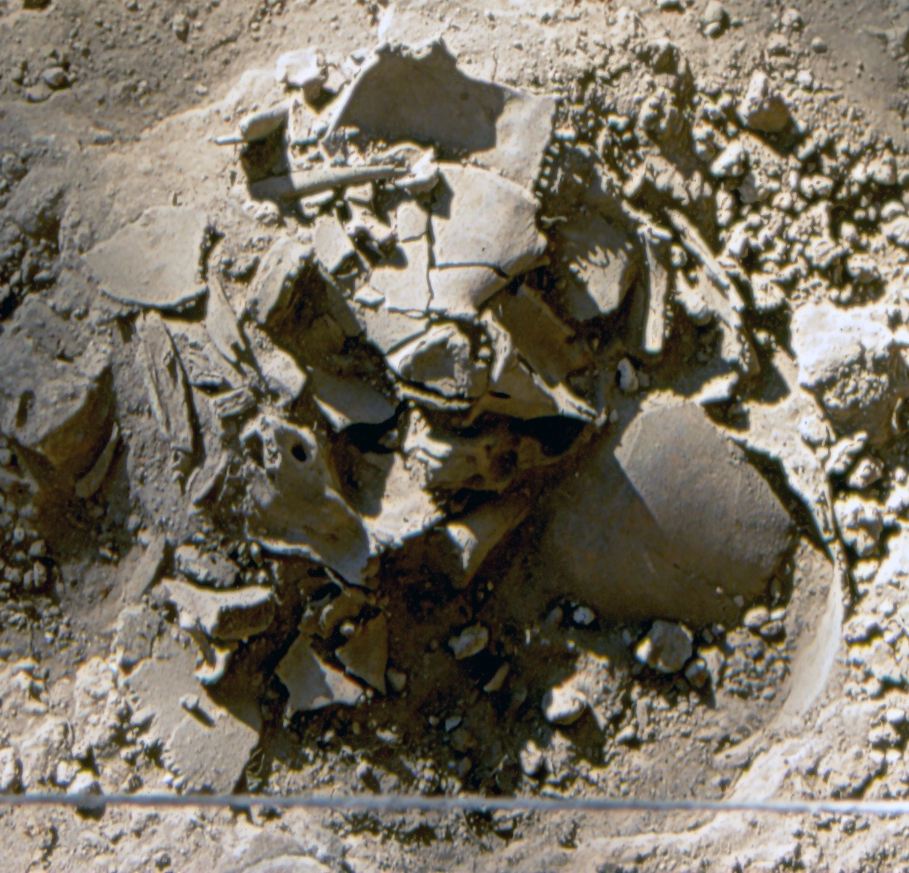
Burial 6. Excavation at exposition 3.

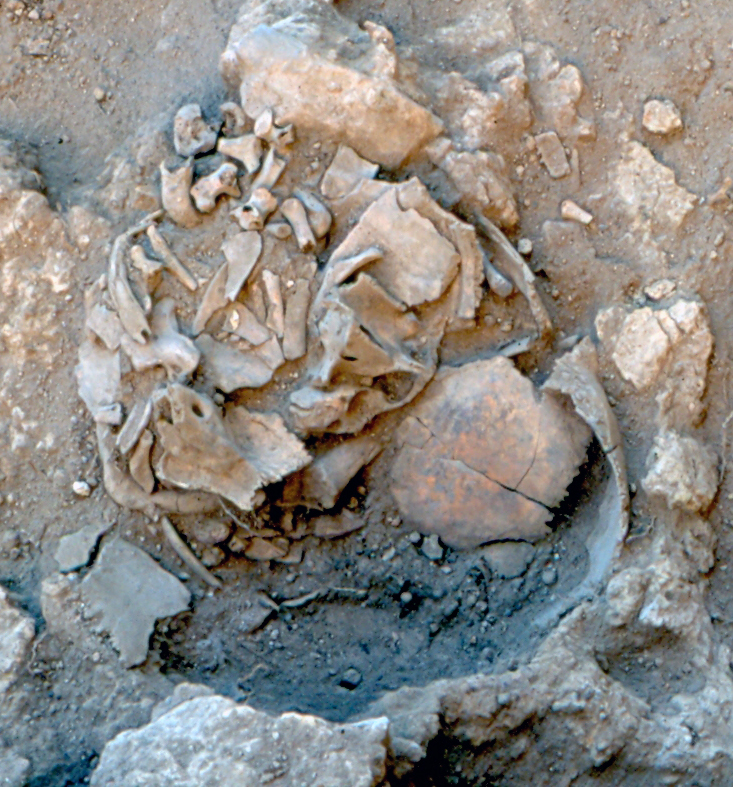
Burial 6. Excavation at exposition 4.

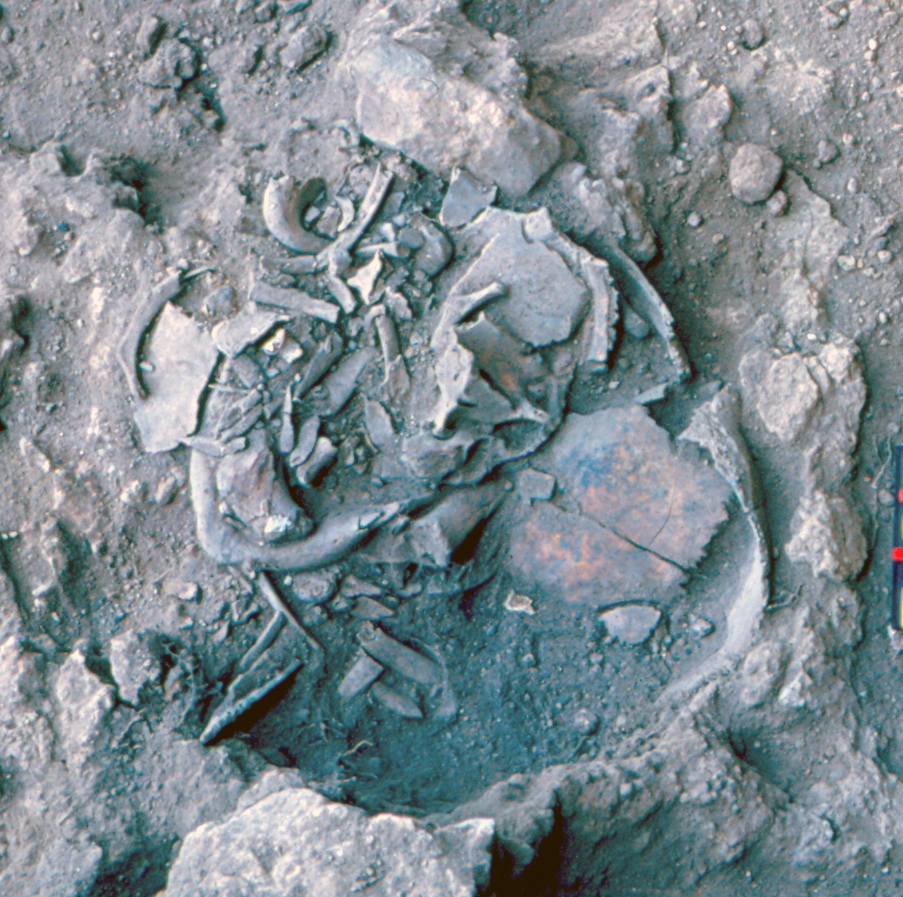
Burial 6. Excavation at exposition 5.

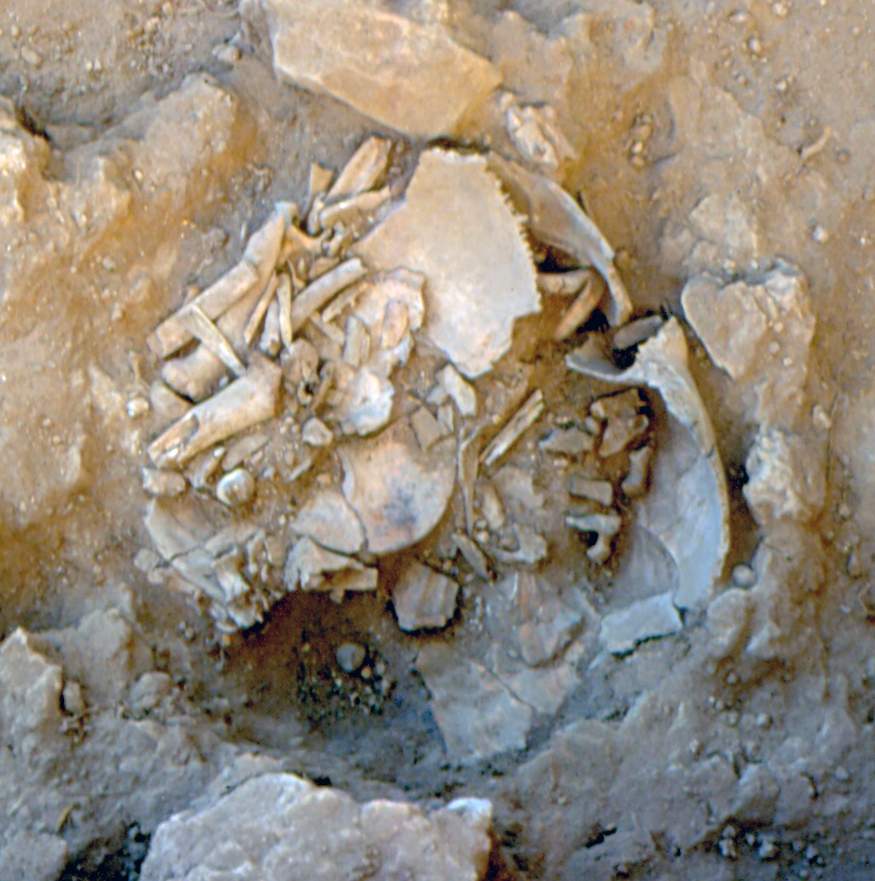
Burial 6. Excavation at exposition 10.

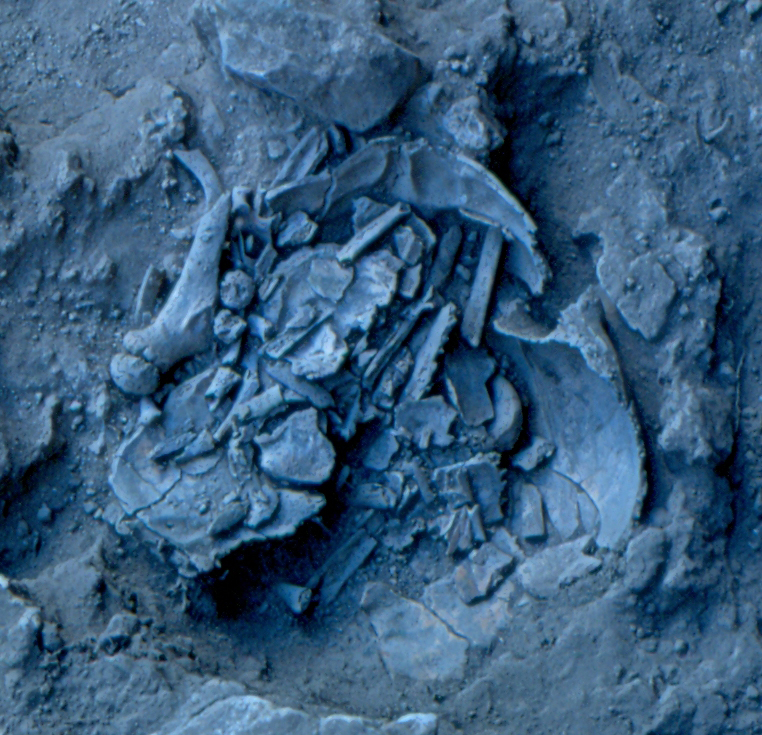
Burial 6. Excavation at exposition 11.

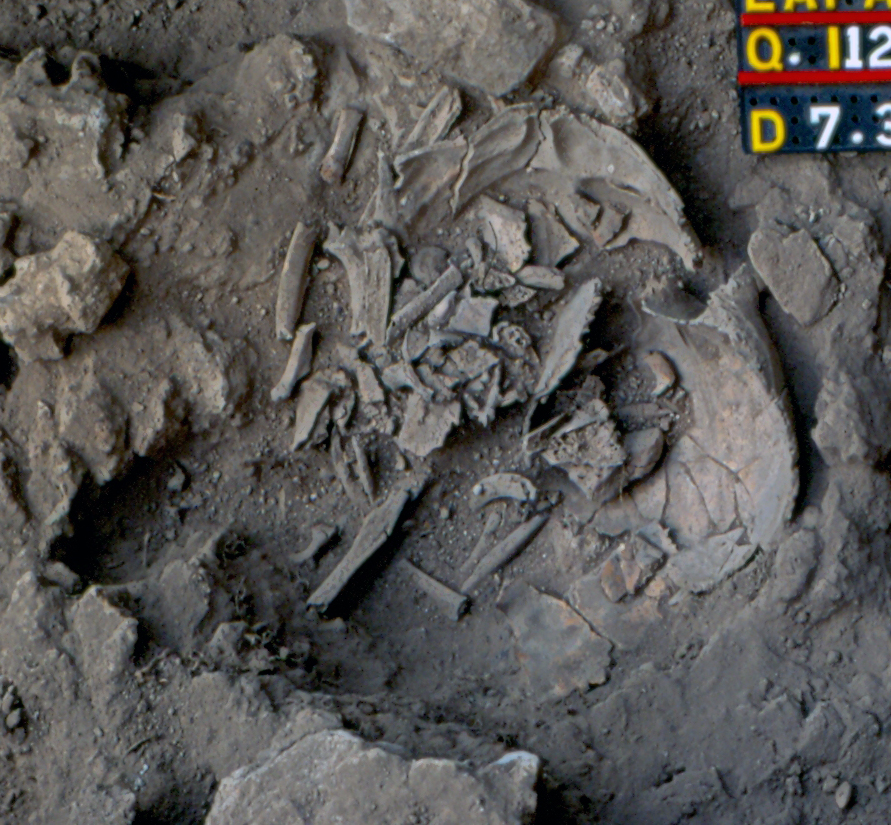
Burial 6. Excavation at exposition 12.

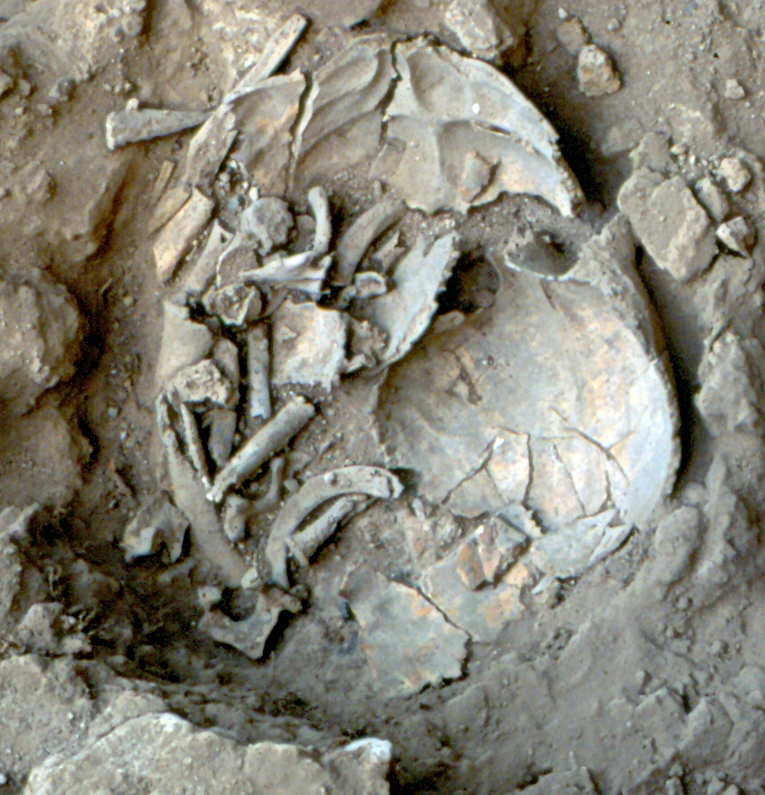
Burial 6. Excavation at exposition 13.

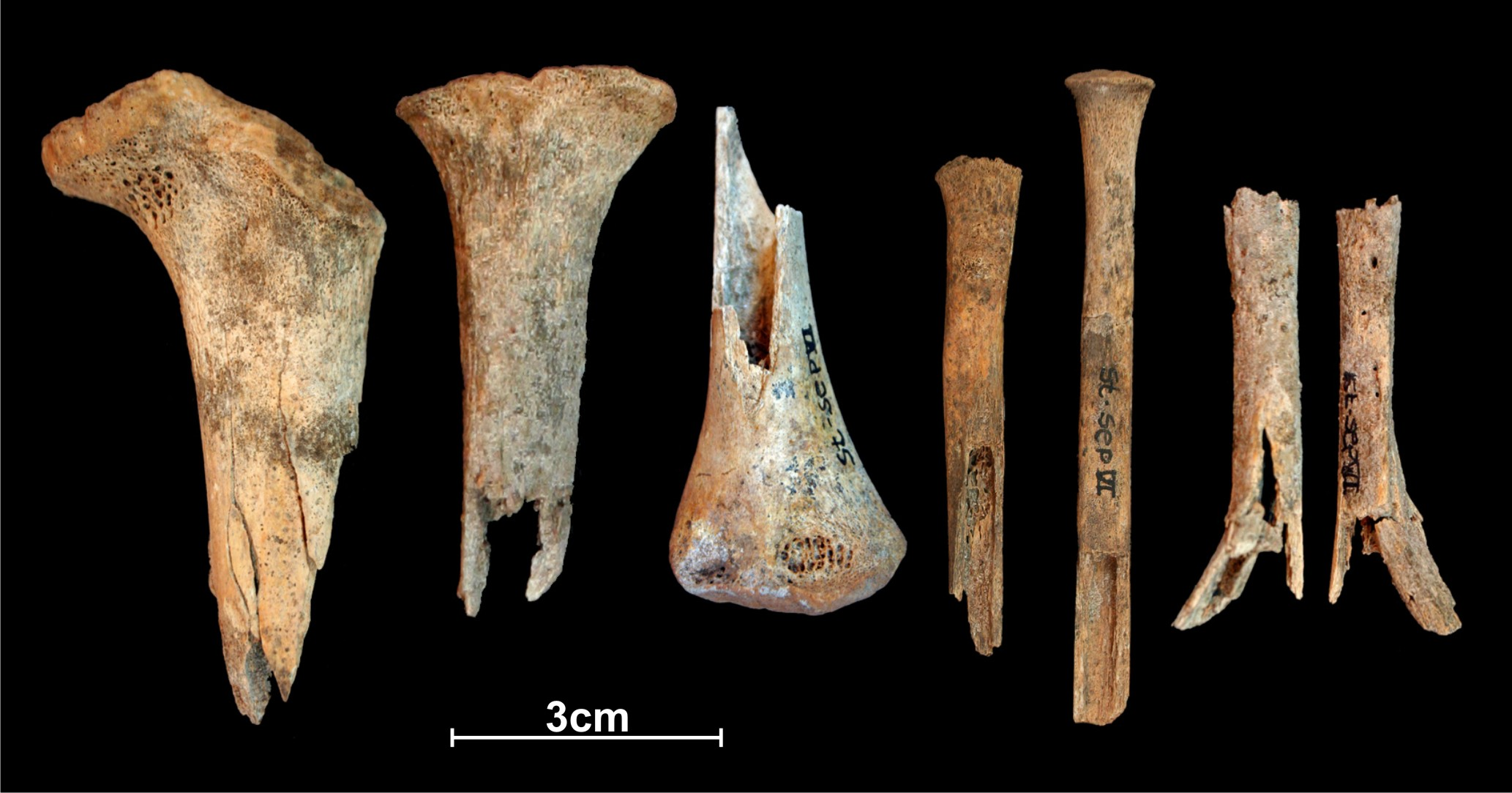
Burial 6. Perimortem fracture on long bones
Lapa do Santo - Burial 7

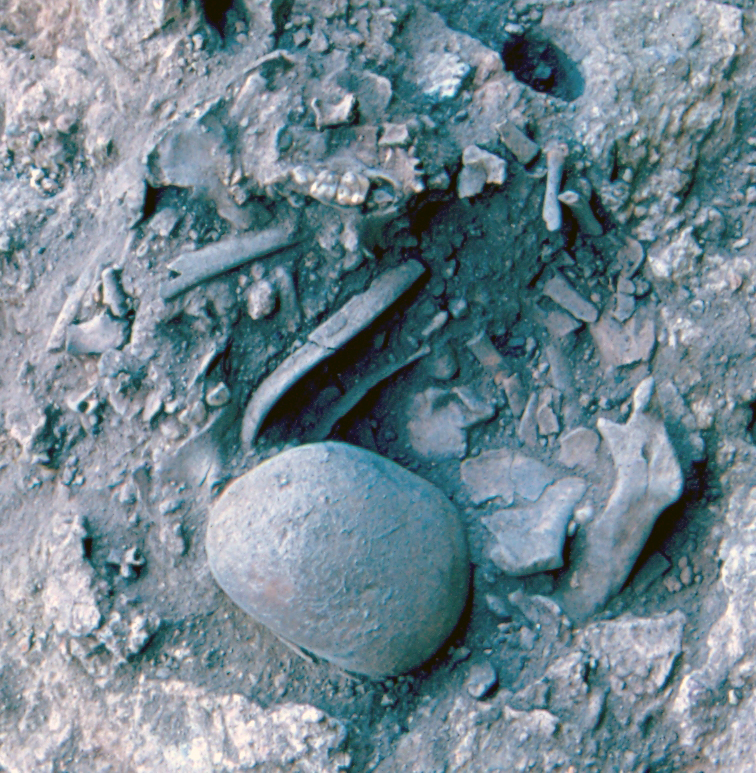
Burial 7. Excavation at exposition 2.

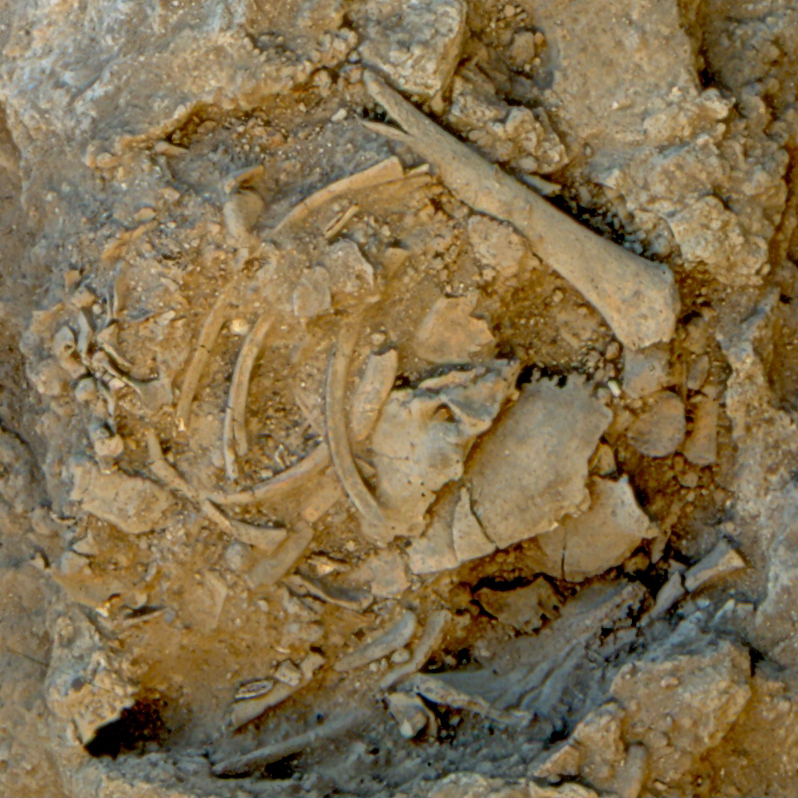
Burial 7. Excavation at exposition 7.

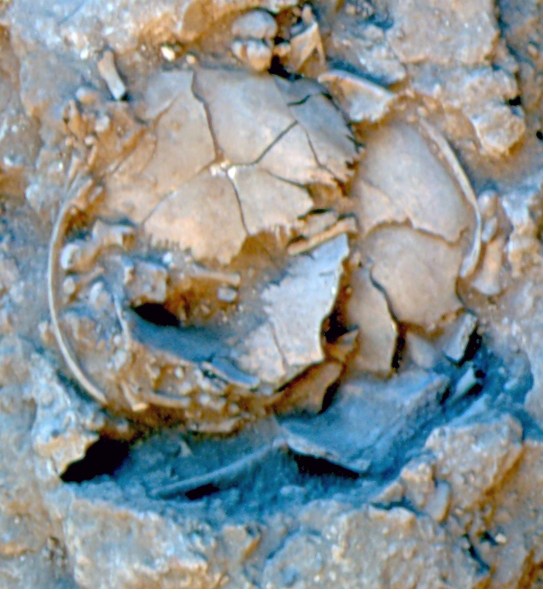
Burial 7. Excavation at exposition 9.

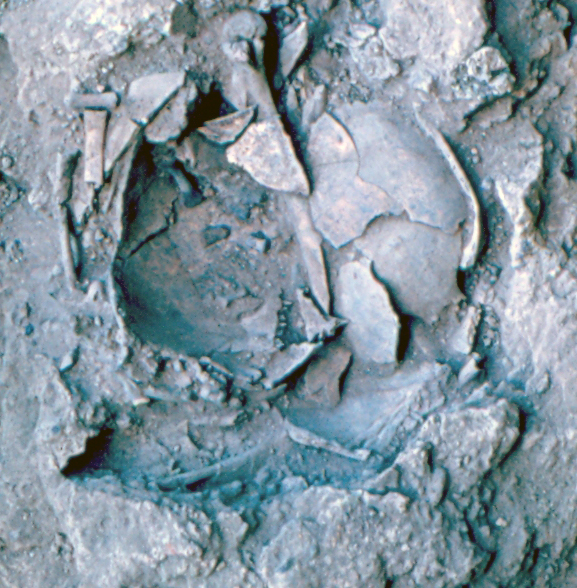
Burial 7. Excavation at exposition 10.

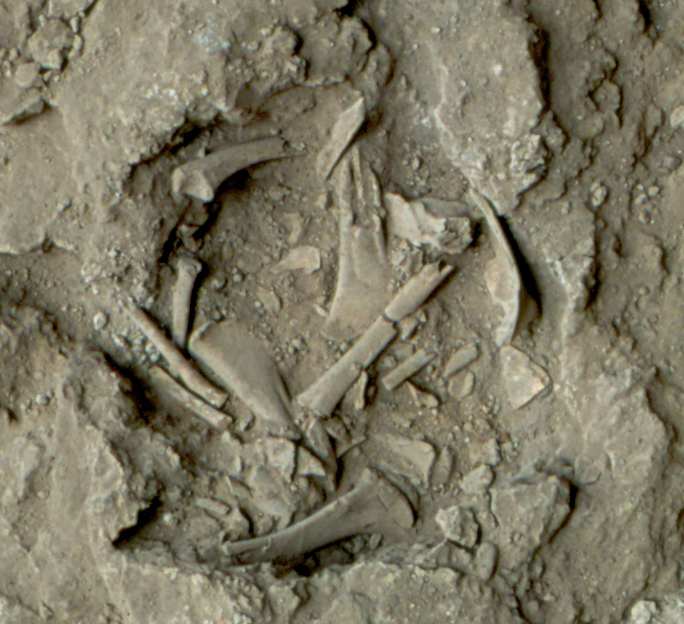
Burial 7. Excavation at exposition 12.

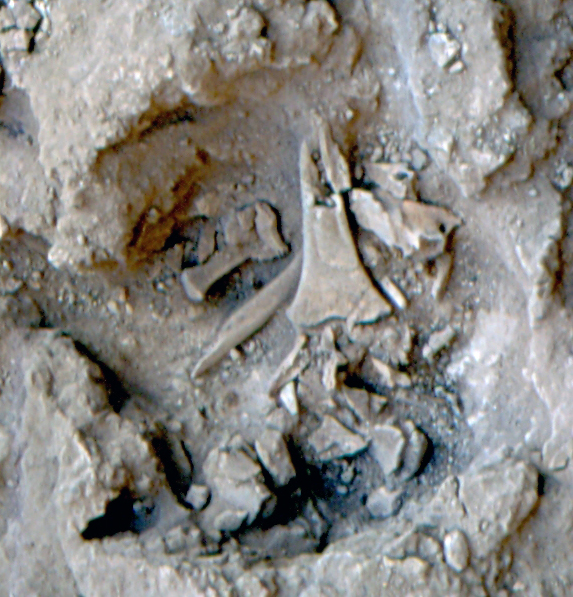
Burial 7. Excavation at exposition 13.

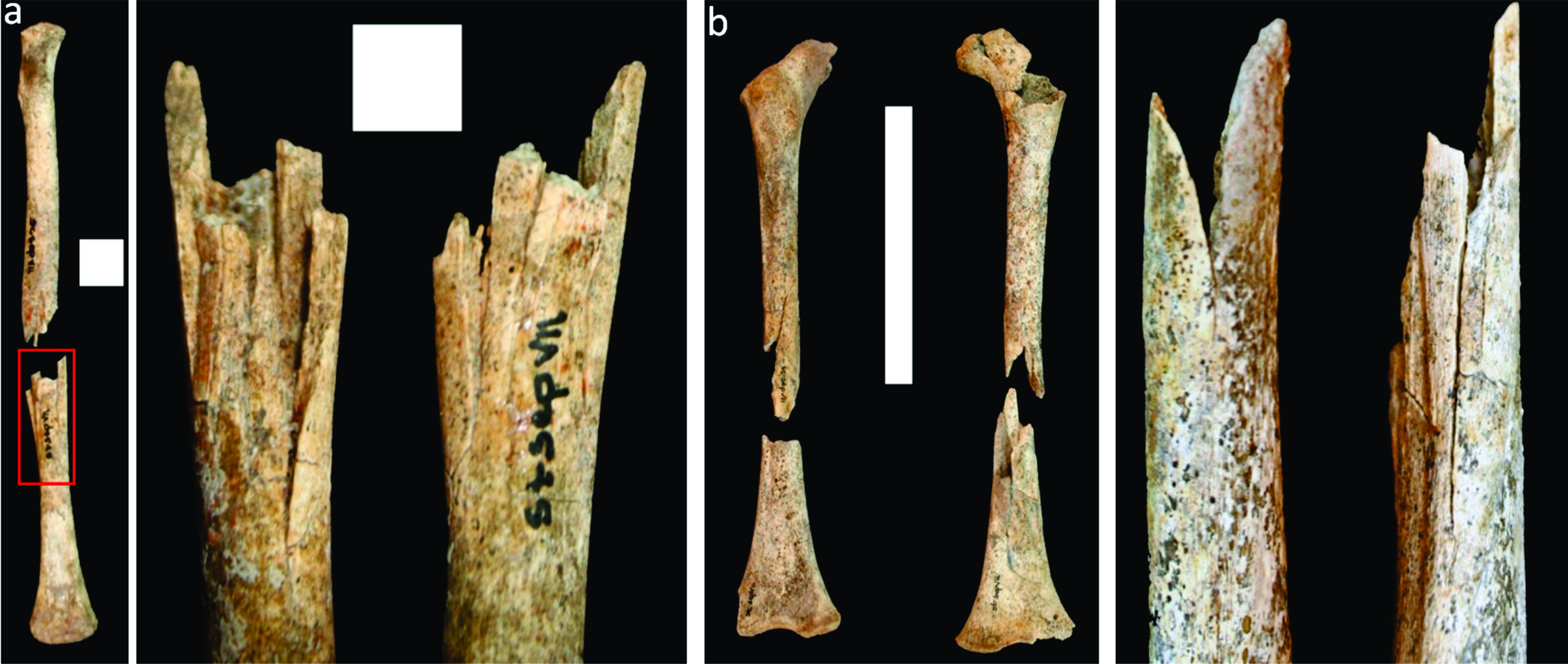
Burial 7. Perimortem fractures on long bones.
Lapa do Santo - Burial 10

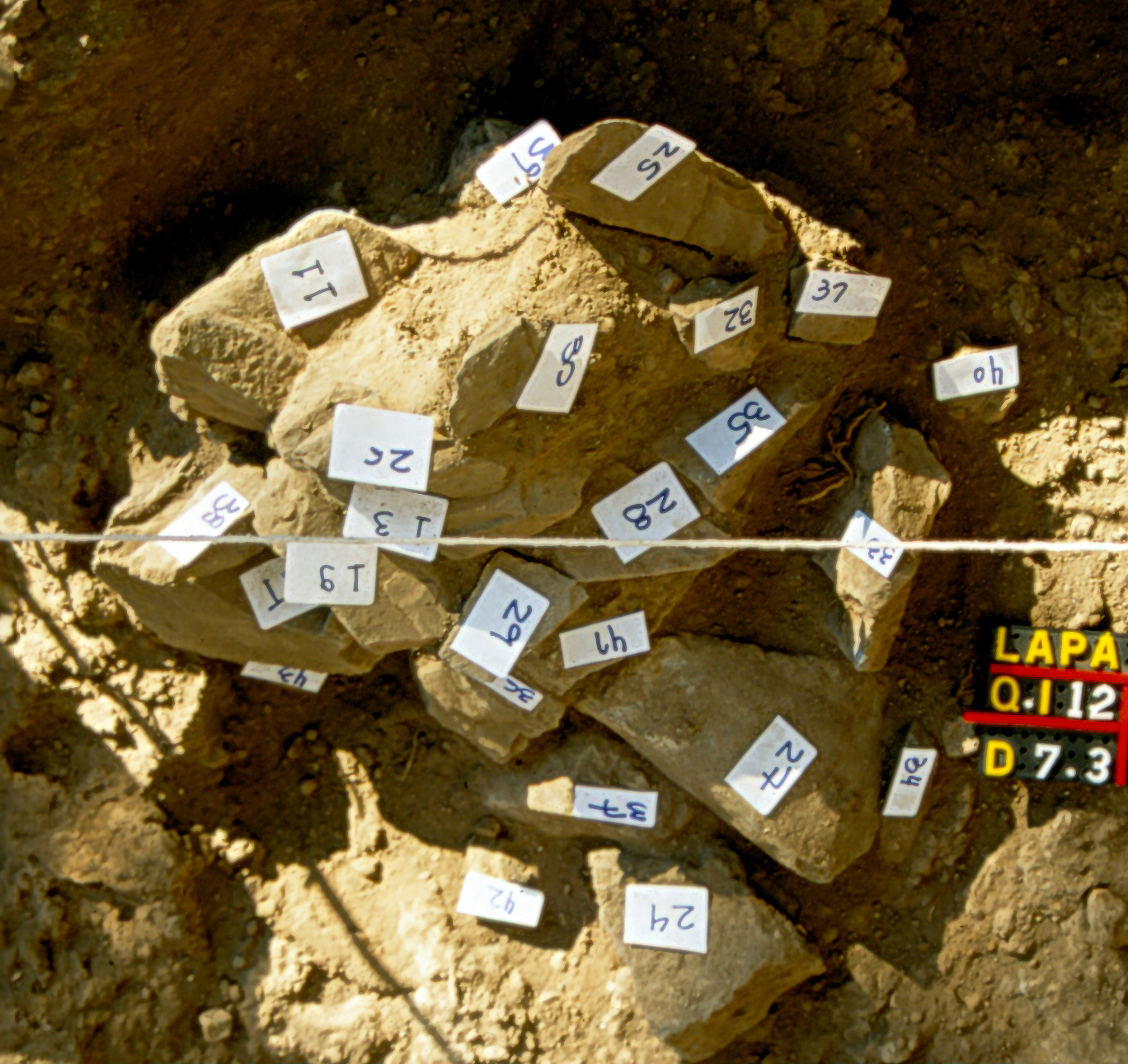
Burial 10 - Limestone blocks were on top

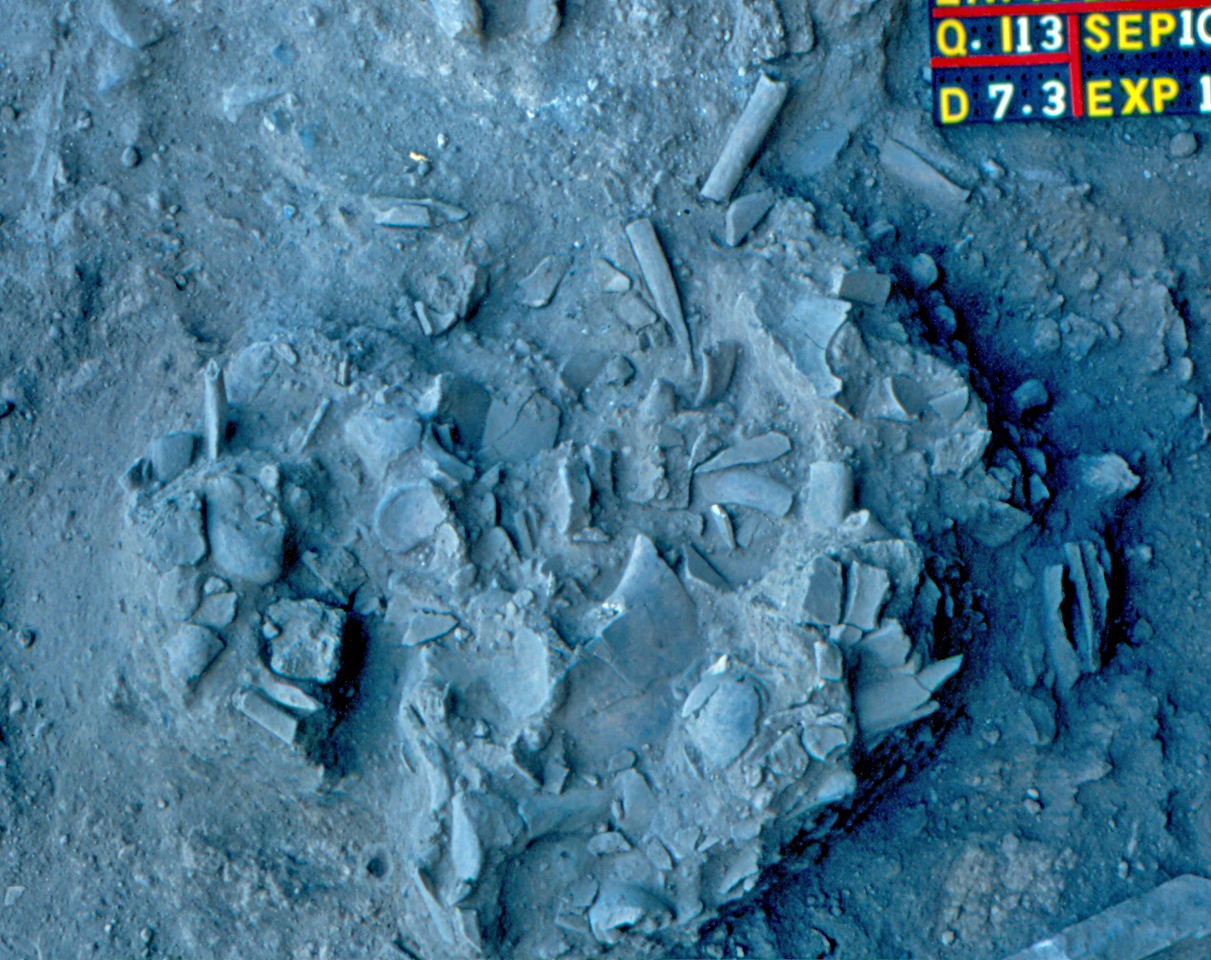
Burial 10. Excavation phase 1.

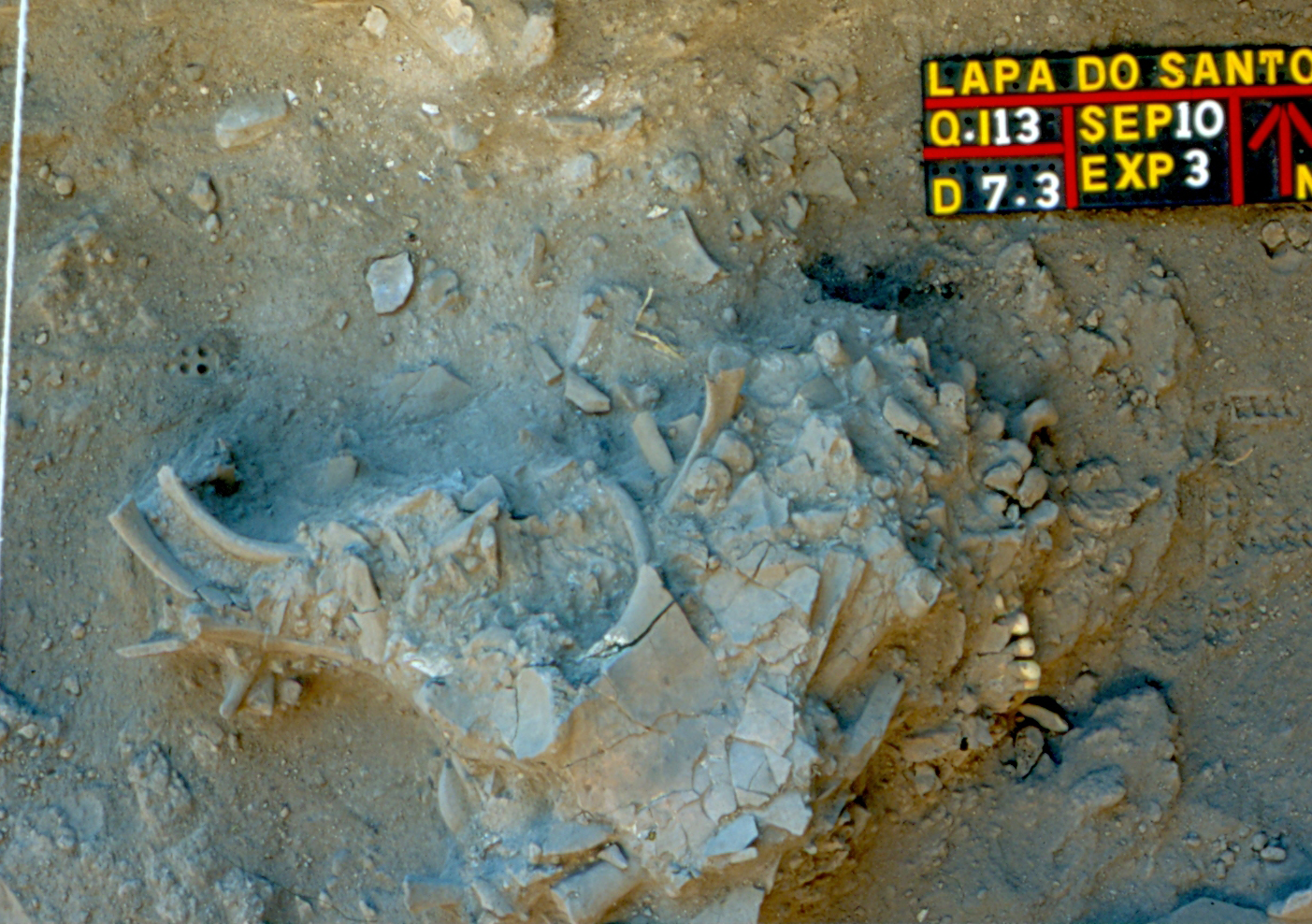
Burial 10. Excavation phase 3.

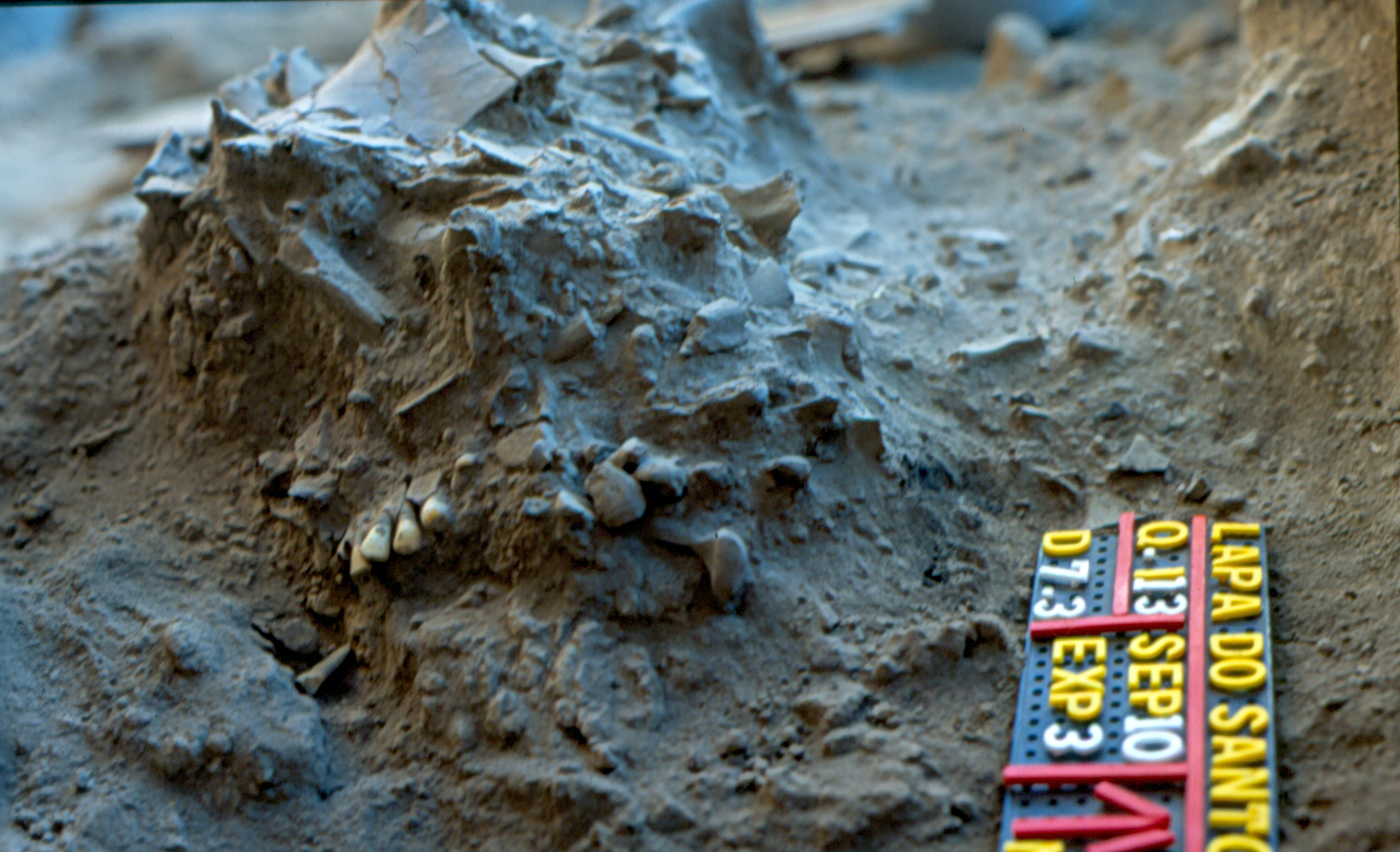
Burial 10. Excavation phase 3.

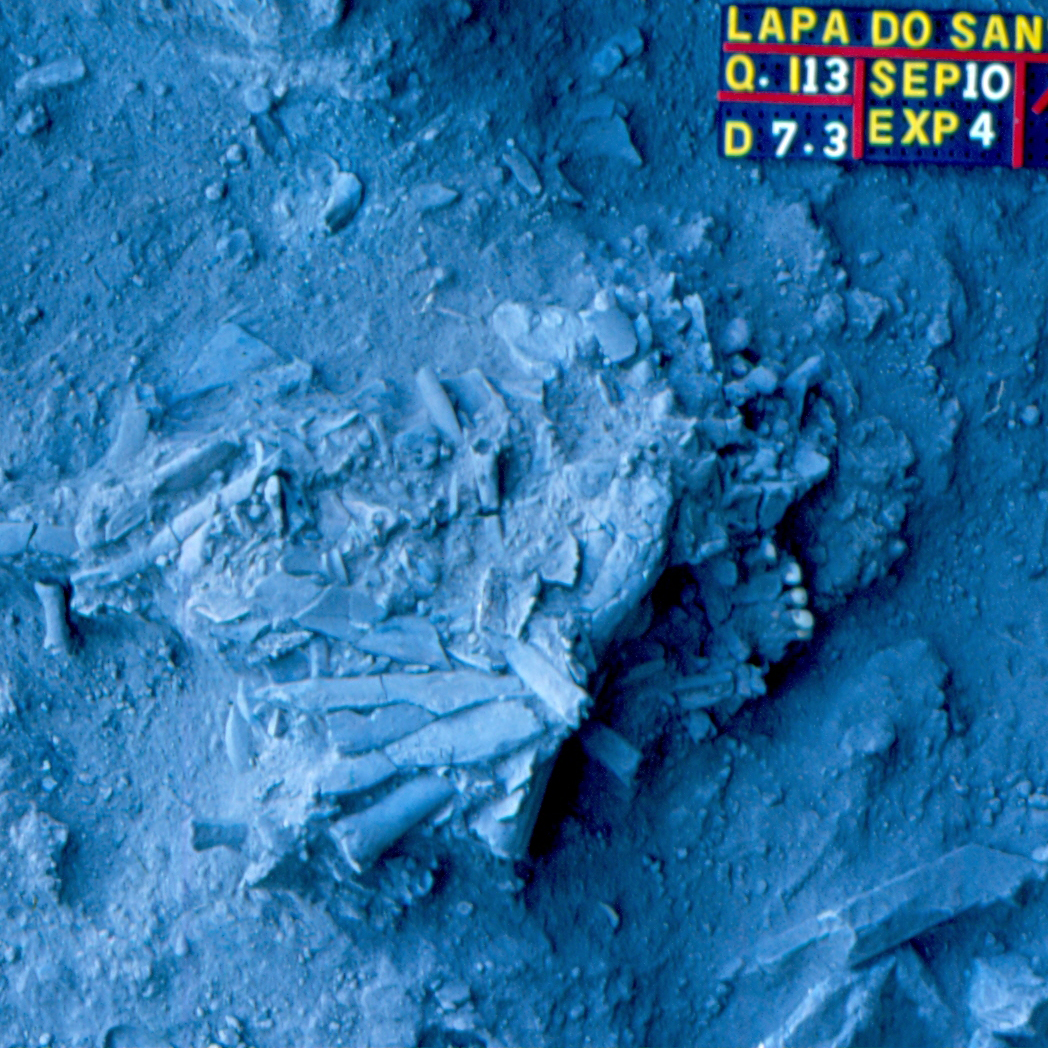
Burial 10. Excavation phase 4.

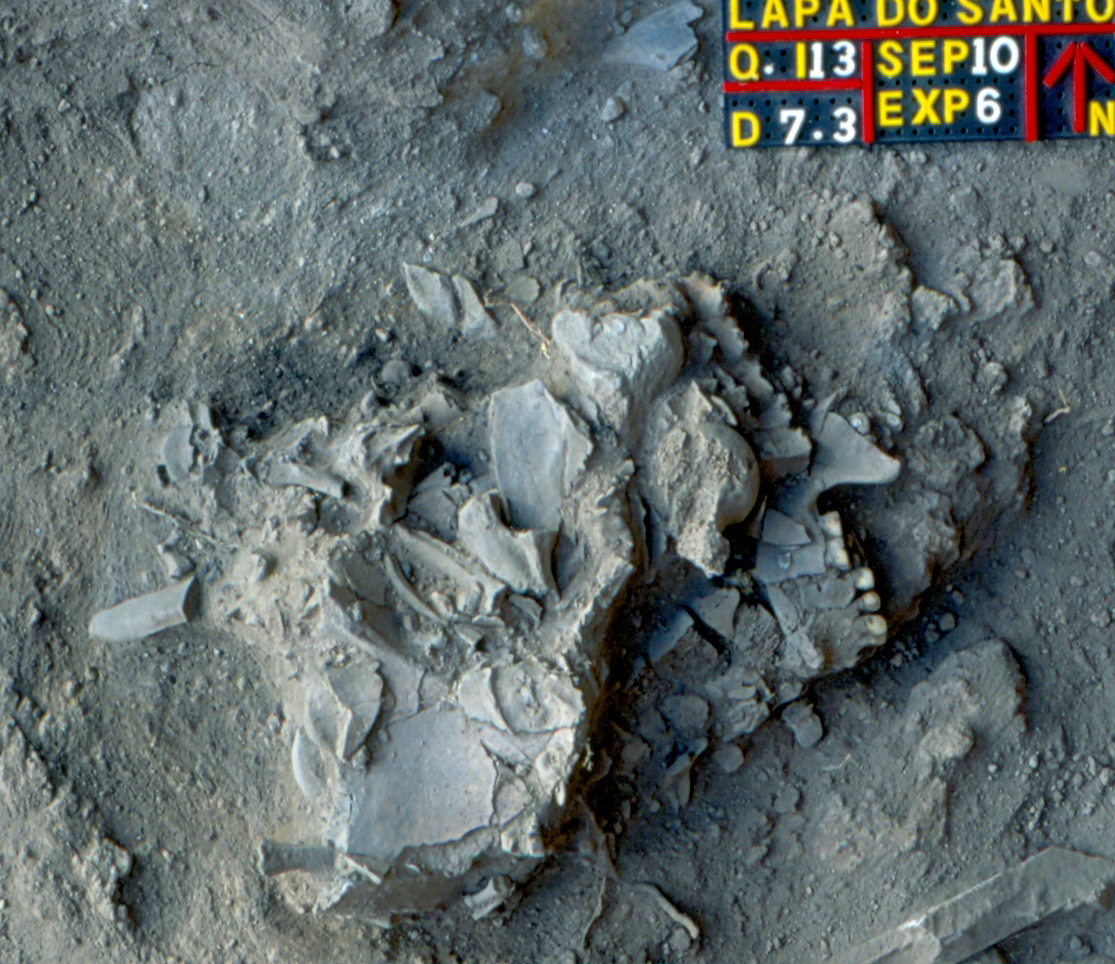
Burial 10. Excavation phase 6.

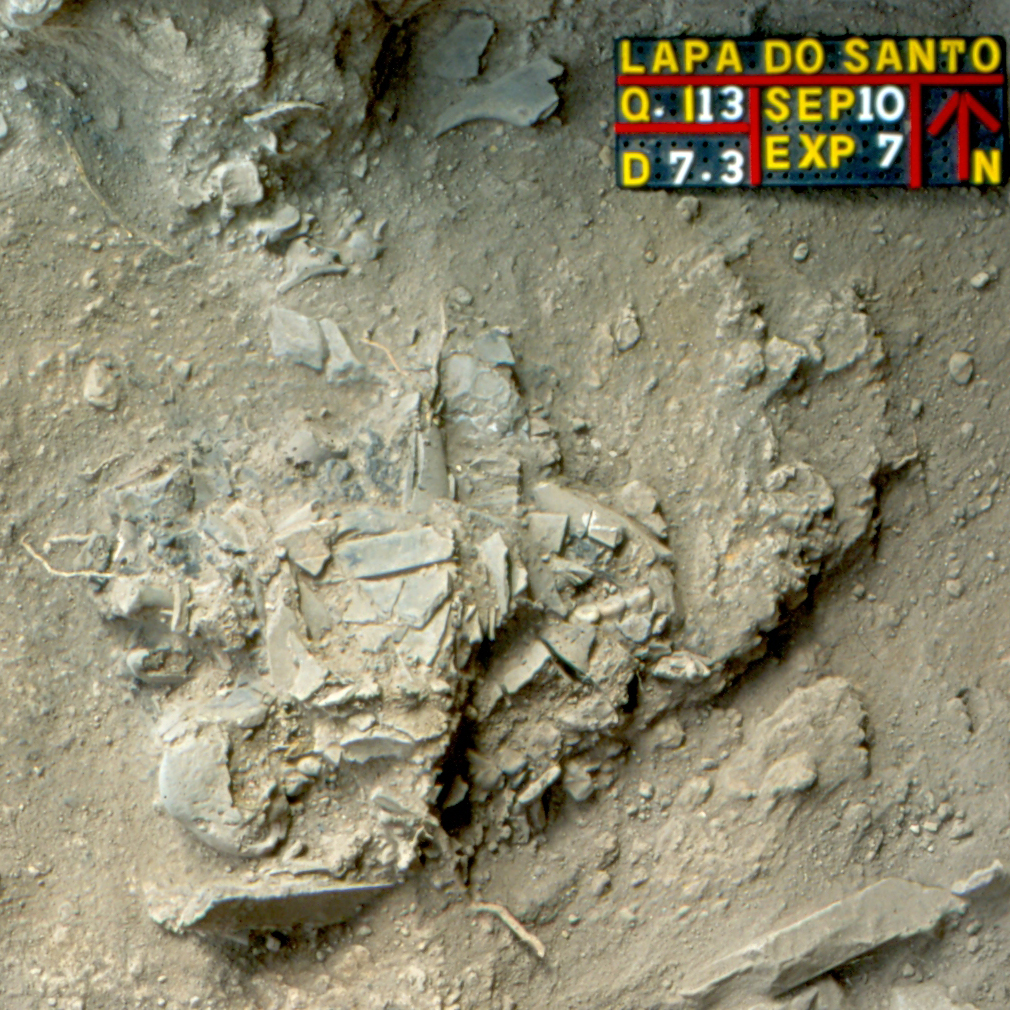
Burial 10. Excavation phase 7.

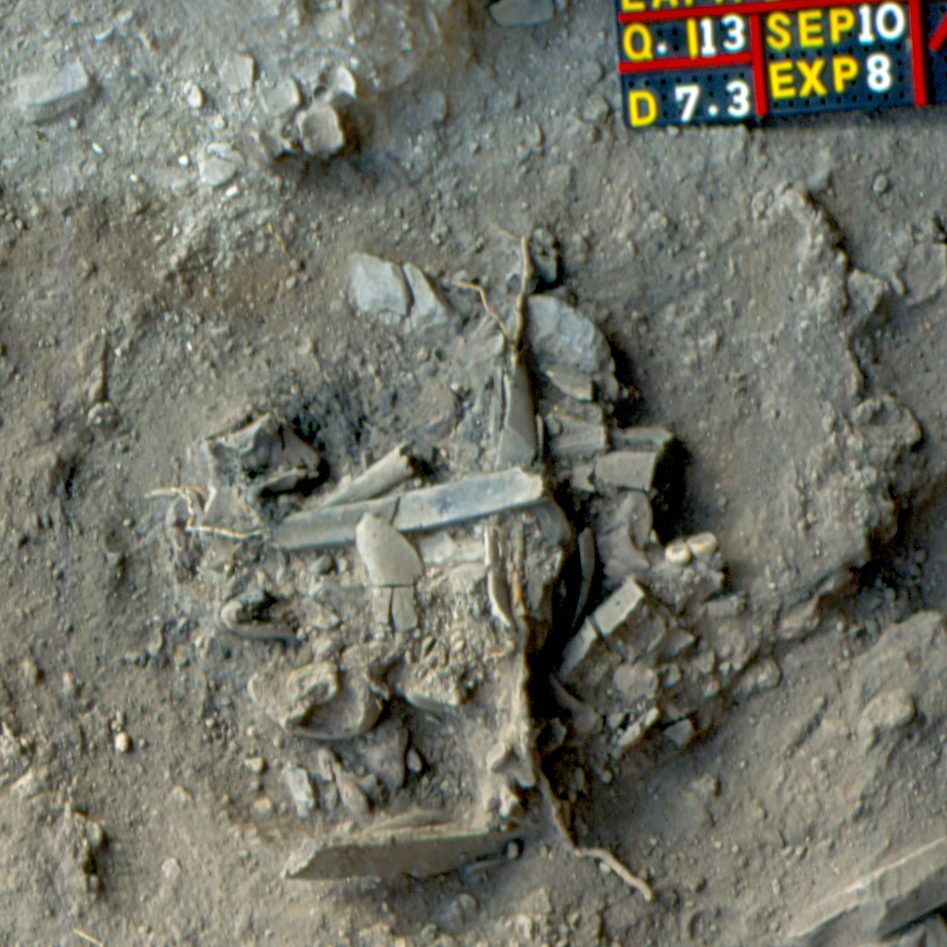
Burial 10. Excavation phase 8.

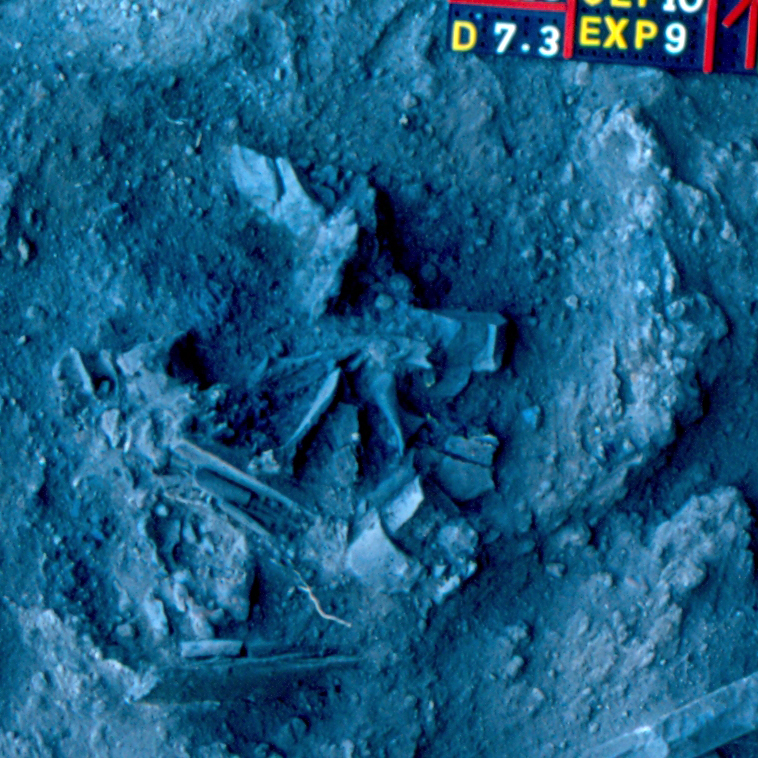
Burial 10. Excavation phase 9.

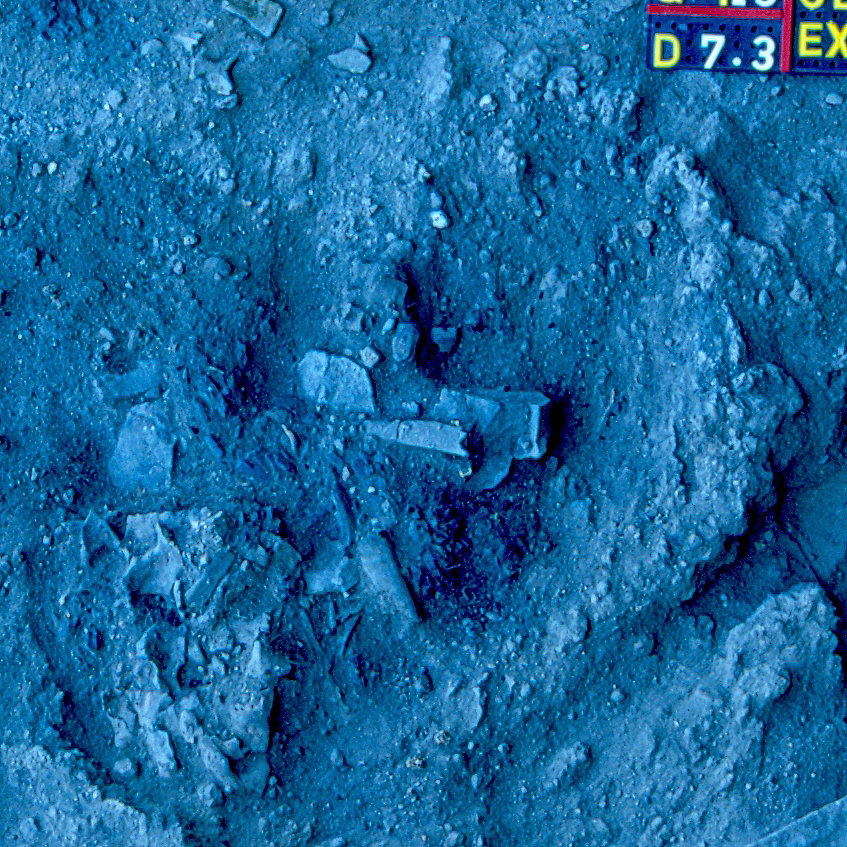
Burial 10. Excavation phase 10.

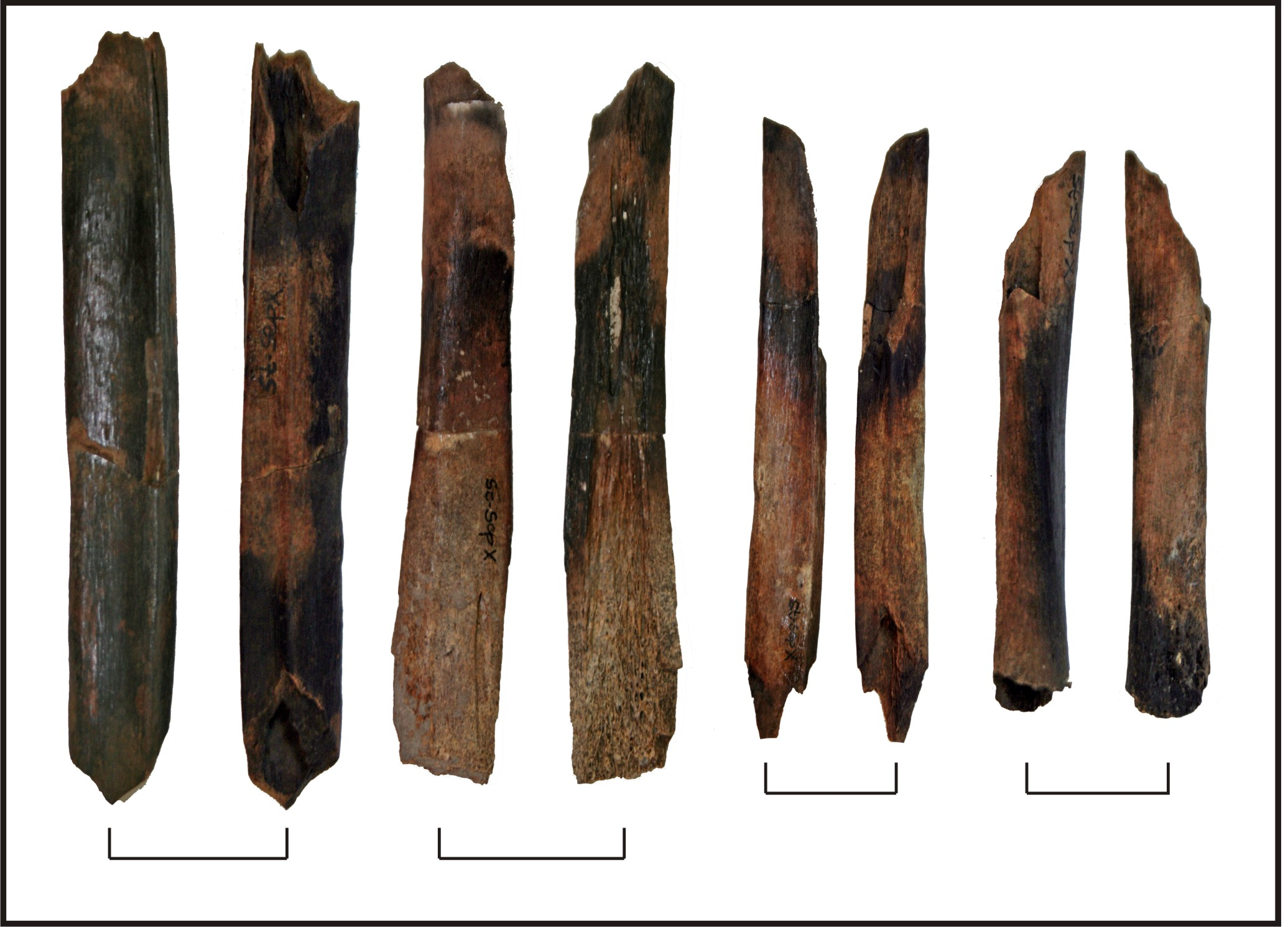
Burial 10. Long bones presenting dark burning marks.
Lapa do Santo - Burial 11

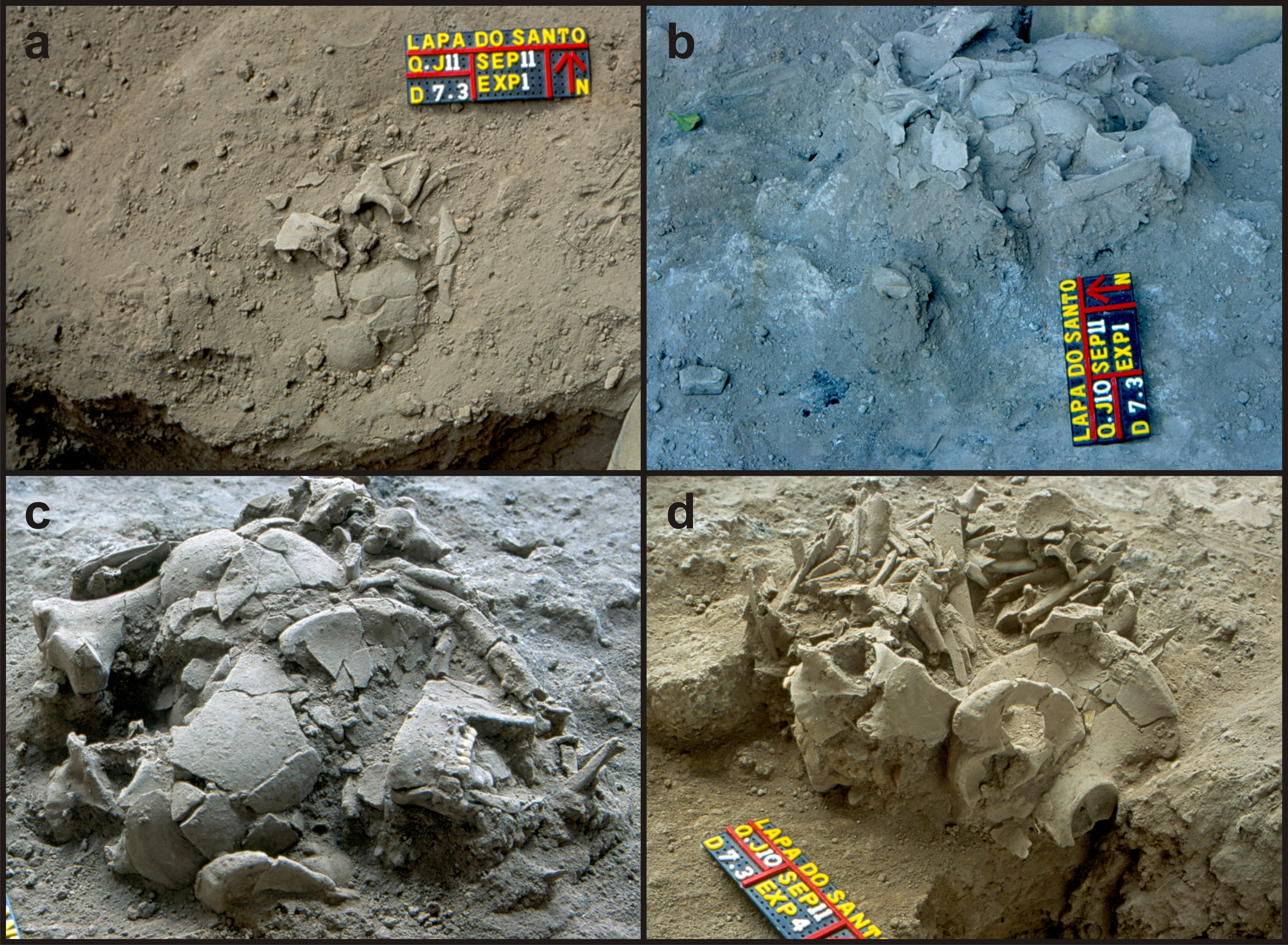
Burial 11 - Field pictures.

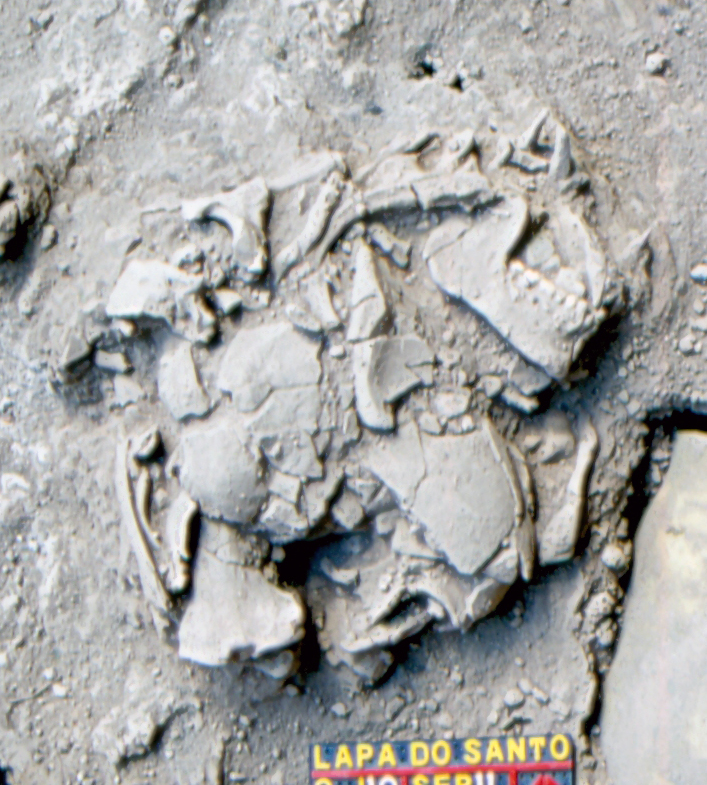
Burial 11 - Excavation at exposition 1.

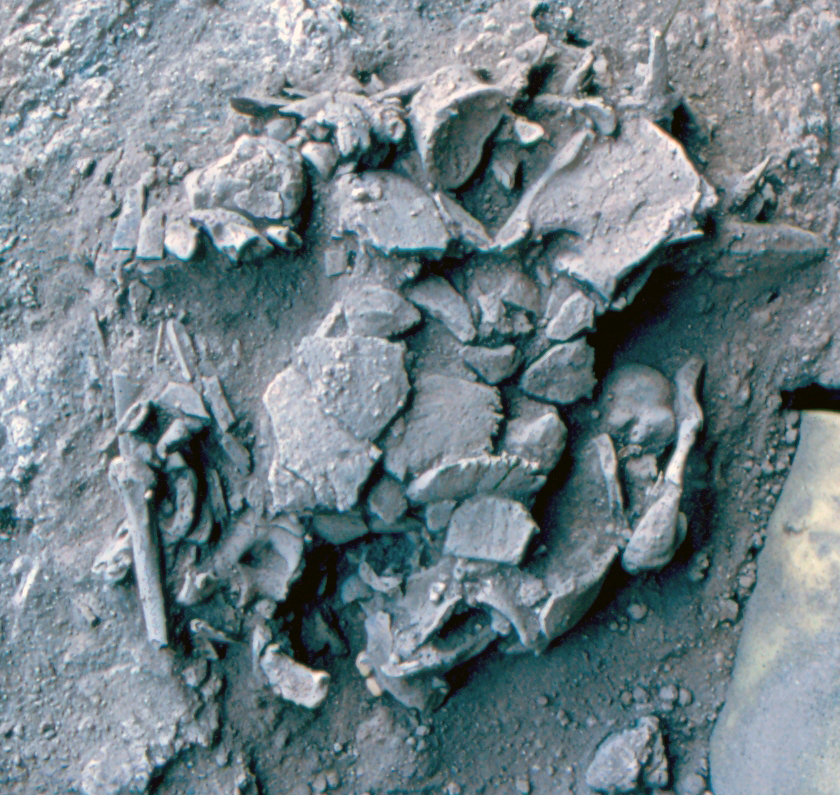
Burial 11 - Excavation at exposition 2.

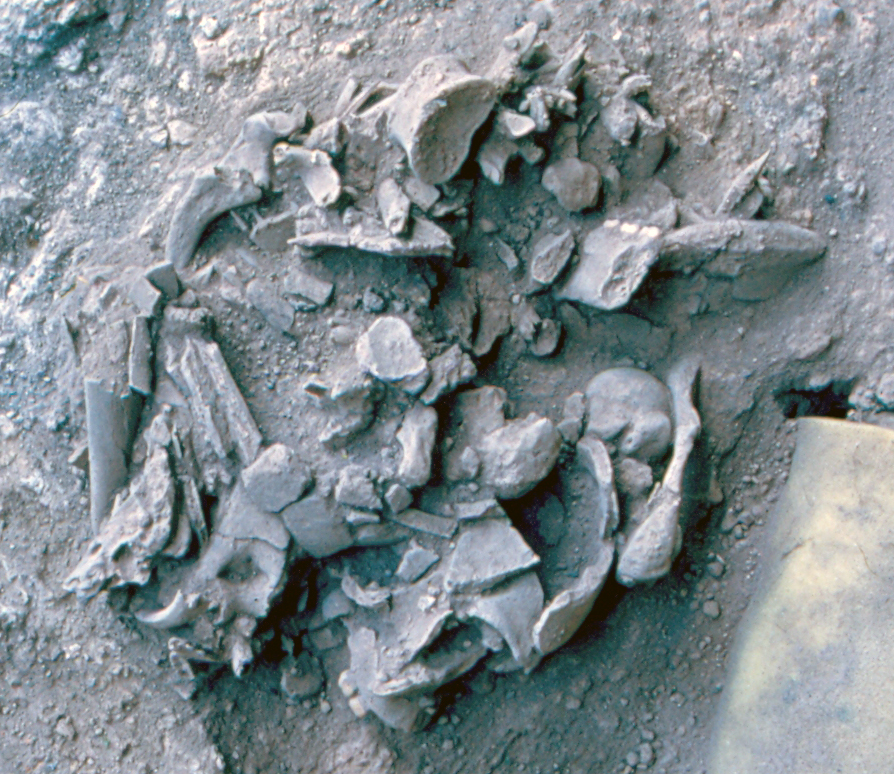
Burial 11 - Excavation at exposition 3.

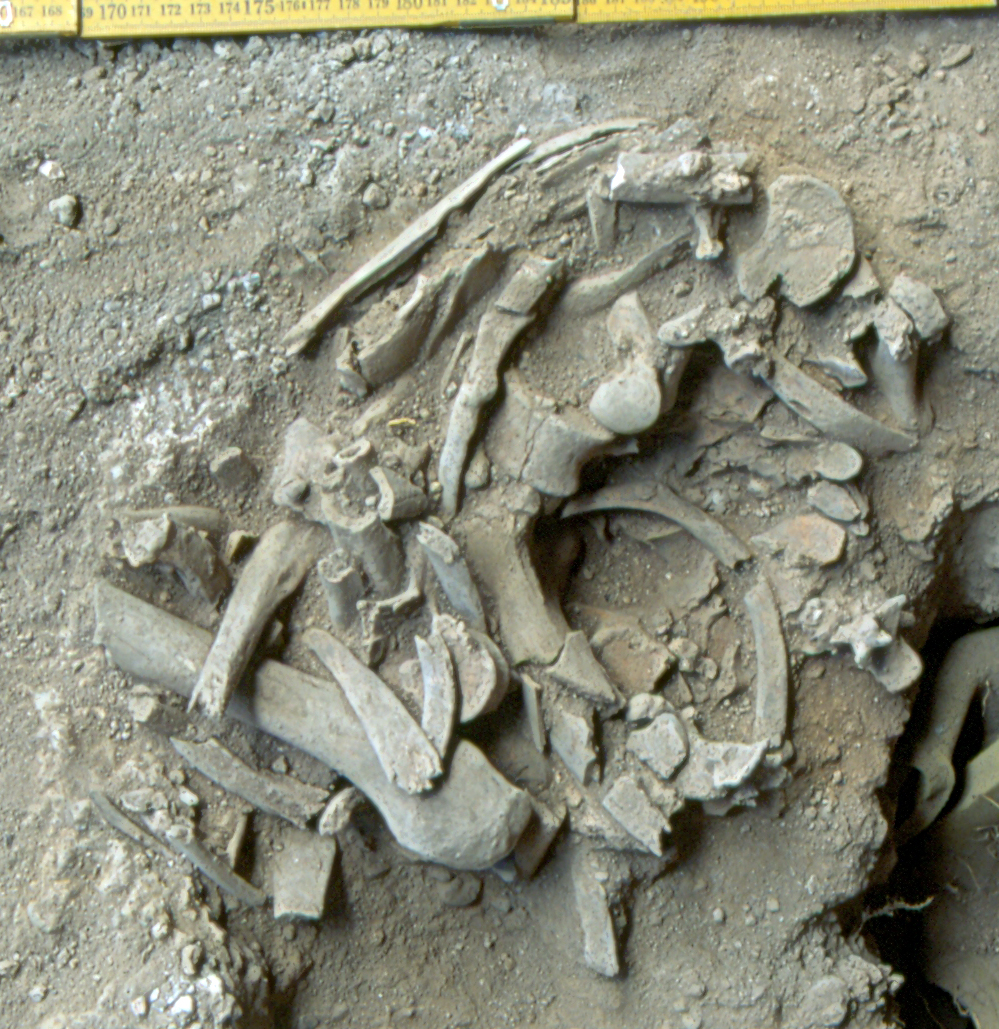
Burial 11 - Excavation at exposition 6.

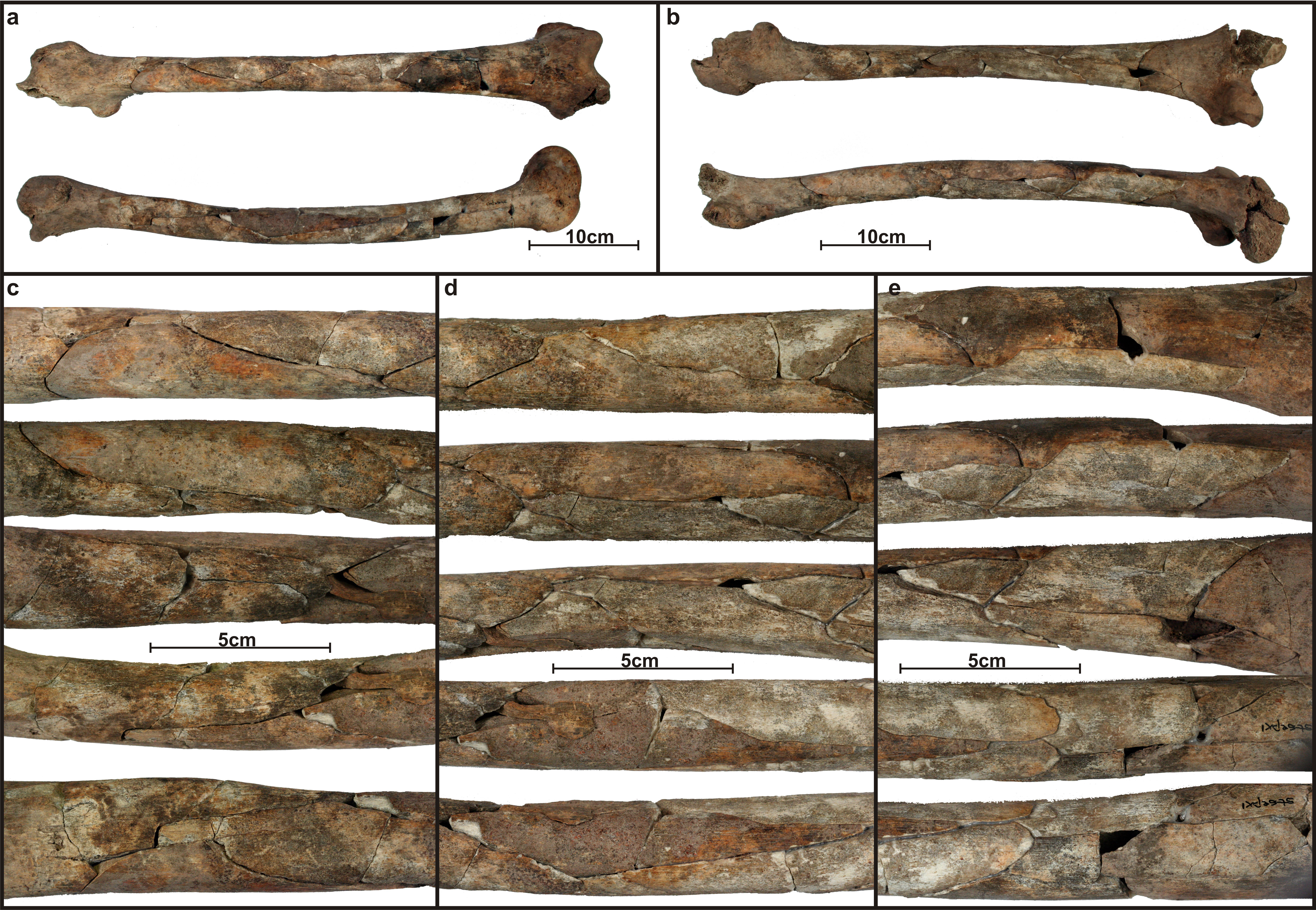
Burial 11 - Perimortem fracture of femur.

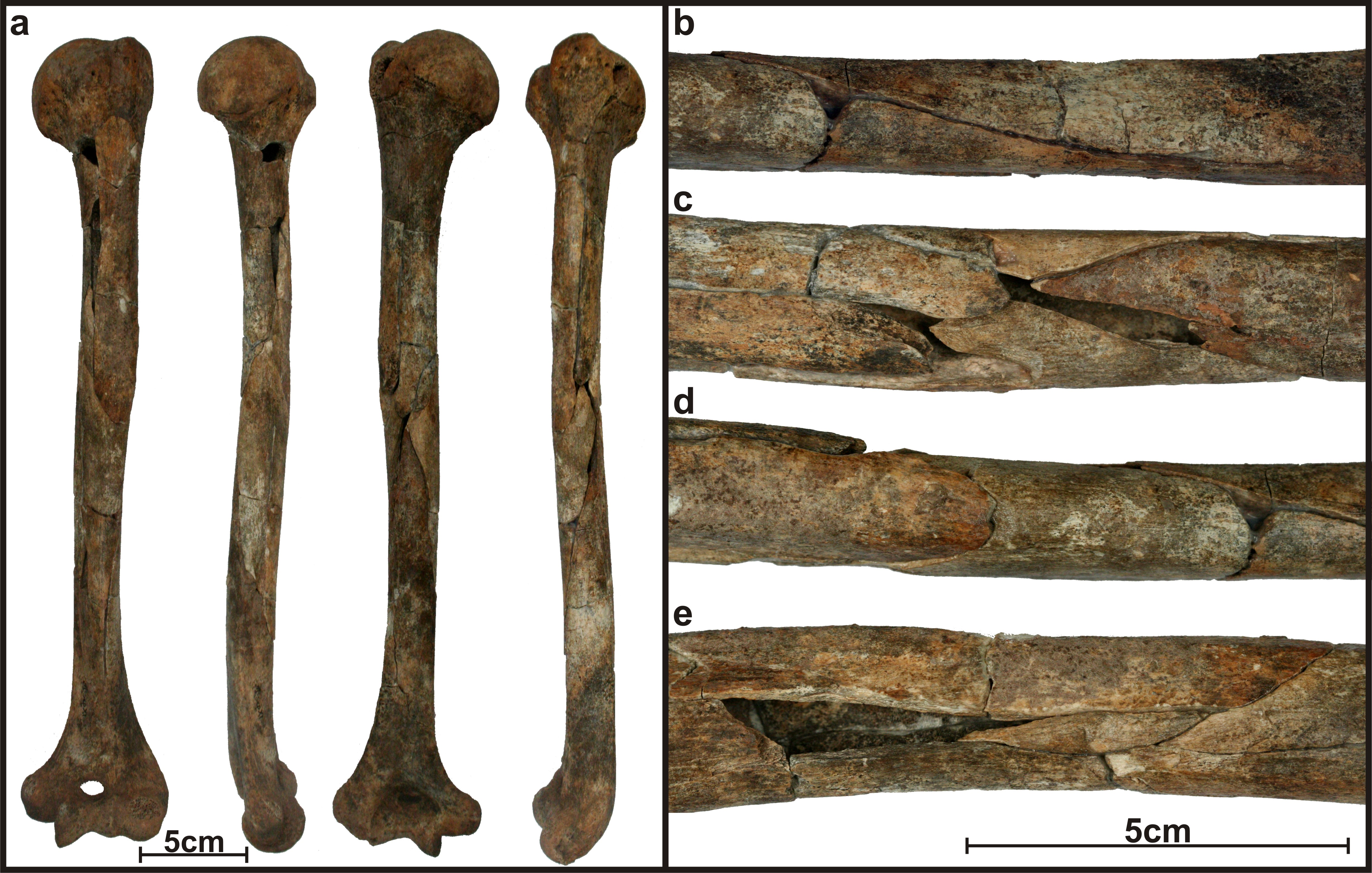
Burial 11 - Perimortem fracture of humerus

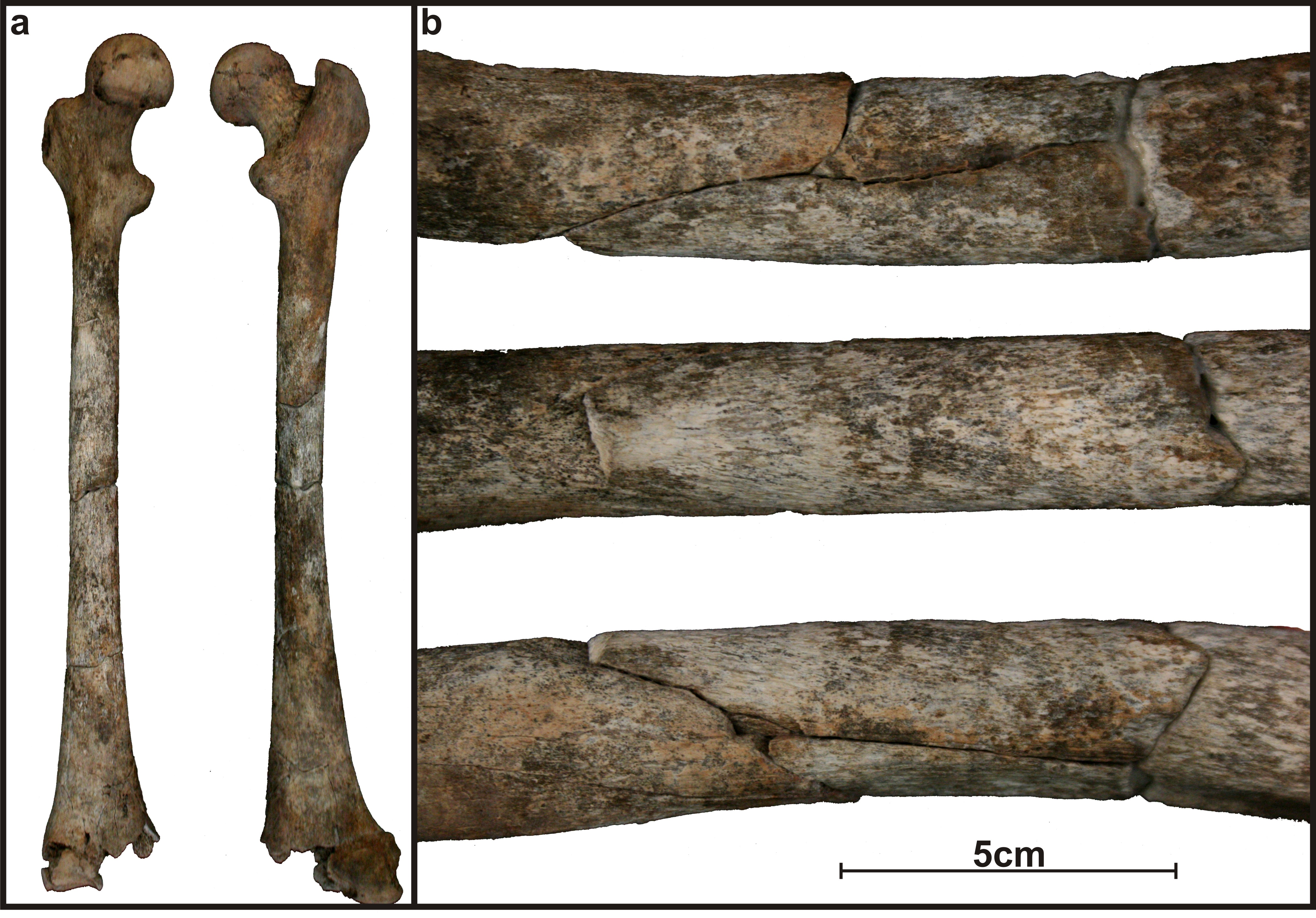
Burial 11 - Perimortem fracture of femur
Lapa do Santo - Burial 12

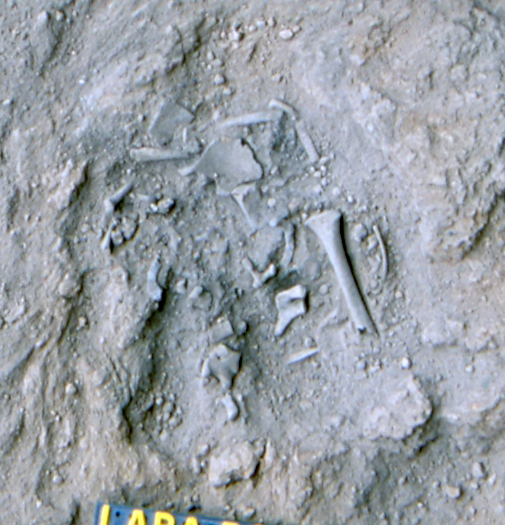
Burial 12. Excavation at phase 1.

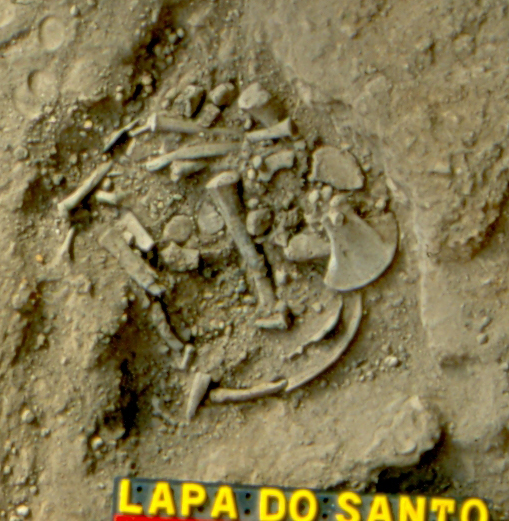
Burial 12. Excavation at phase 2.

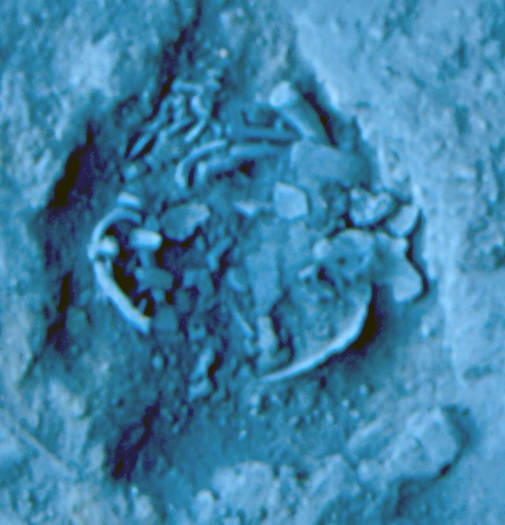
Burial 12. Excavation at phase 3.

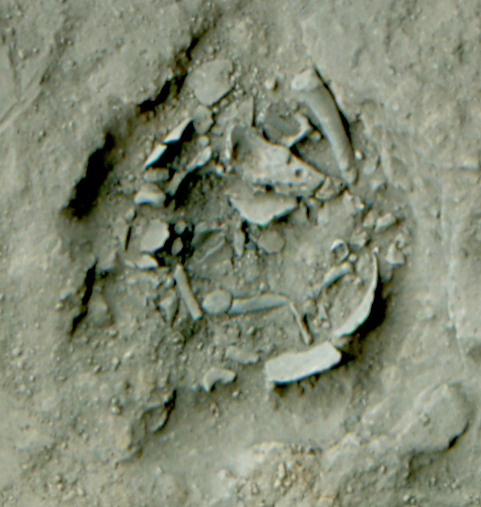
Burial 12. Excavation at phase 4.

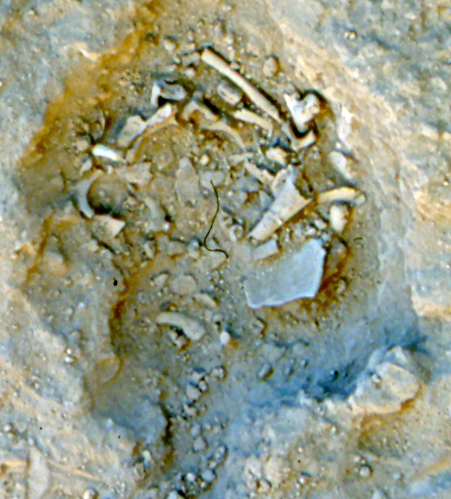
Burial 12. Excavation at phase 5.

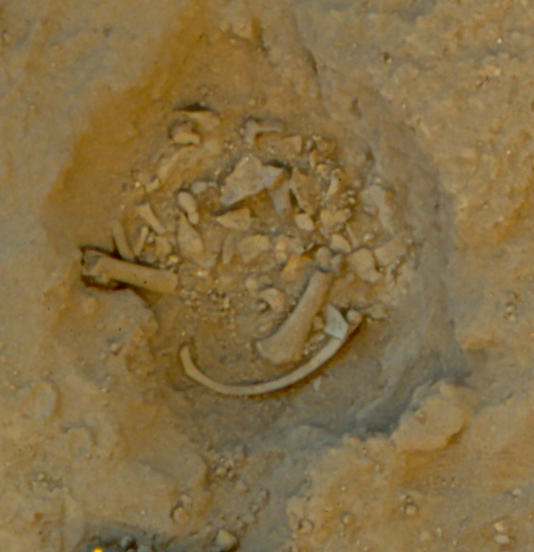
Burial 12. Excavation at phase 6.

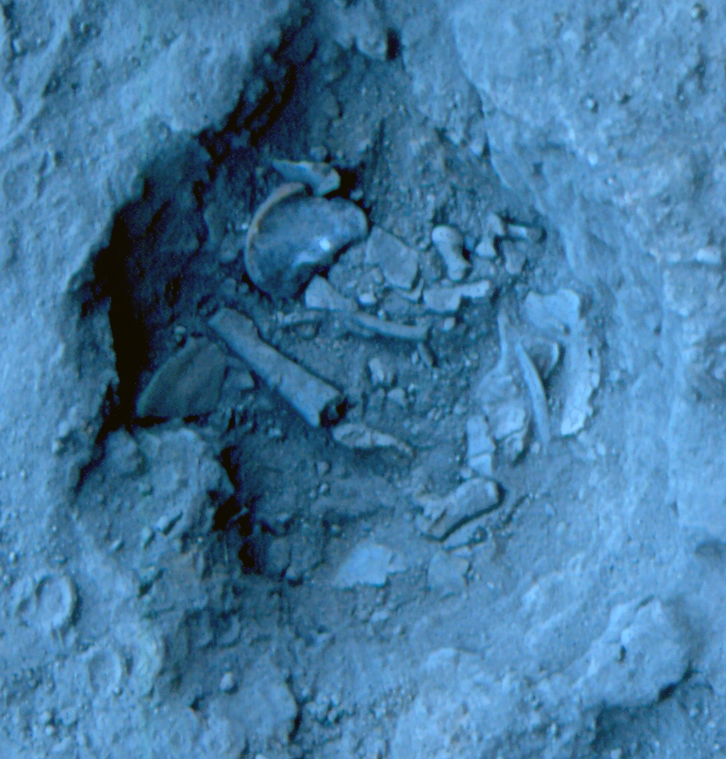
Burial 12. Excavation at phase 7.

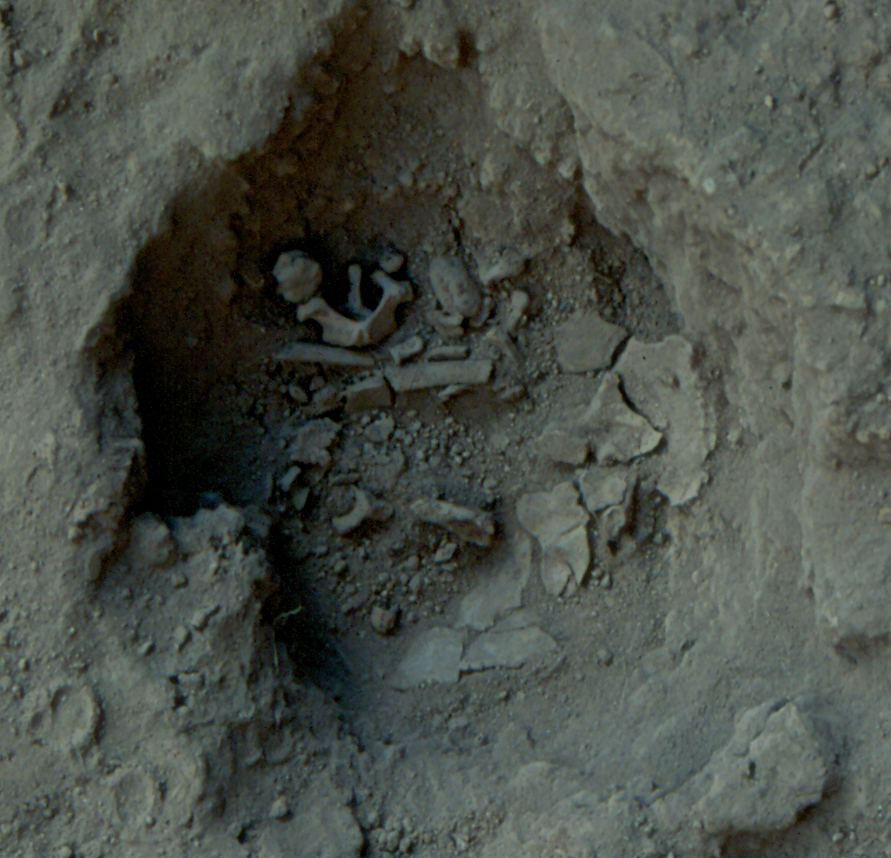
Burial 12. Excavation at phase 8.

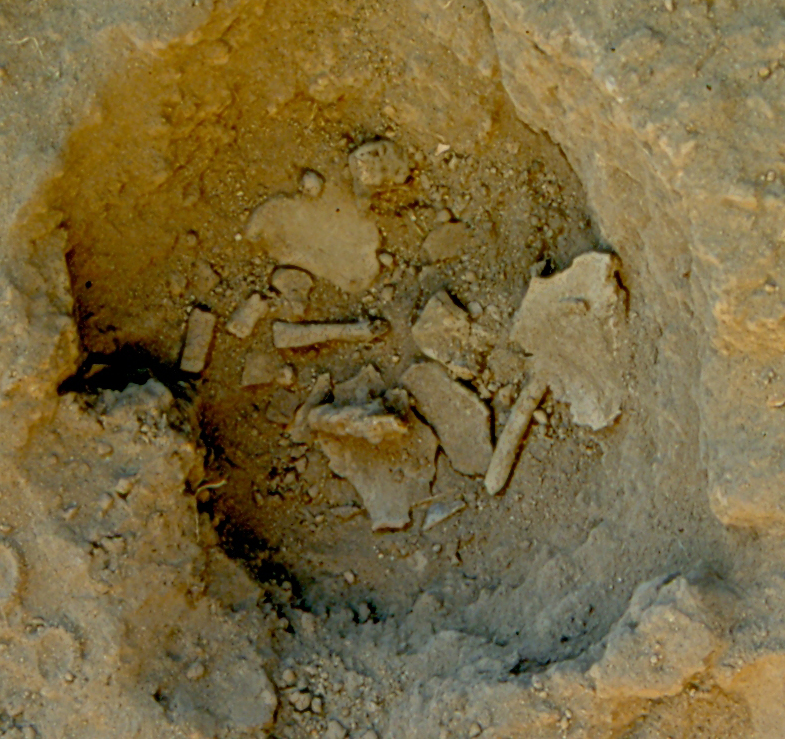
Burial 12. Excavation at phase 9.

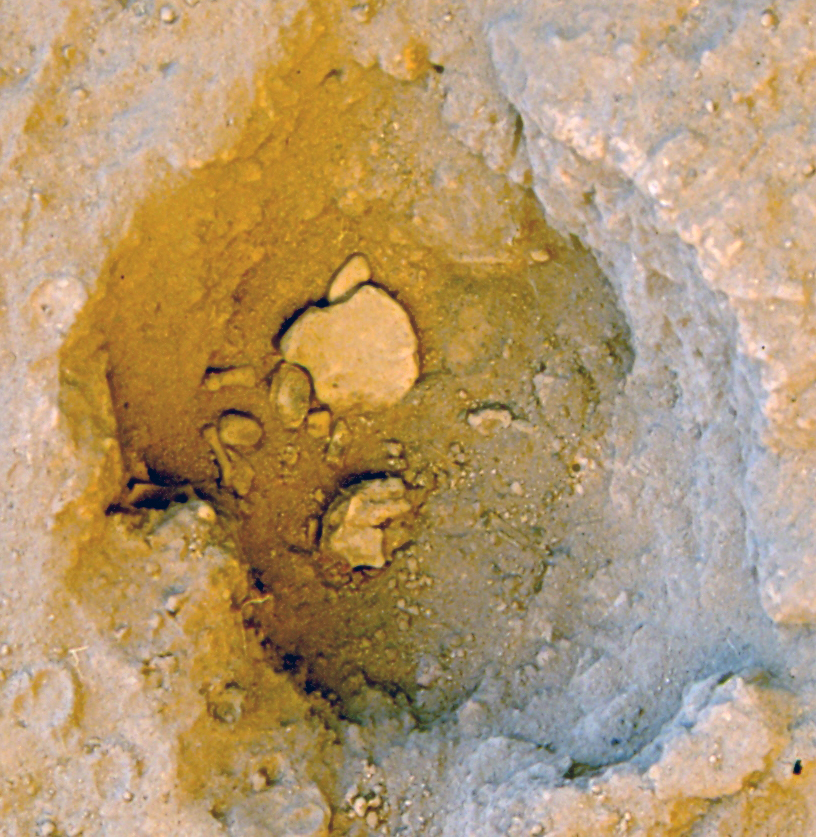
Burial 12. Excavation at phase 10.
Lapa do Santo - Burial 13

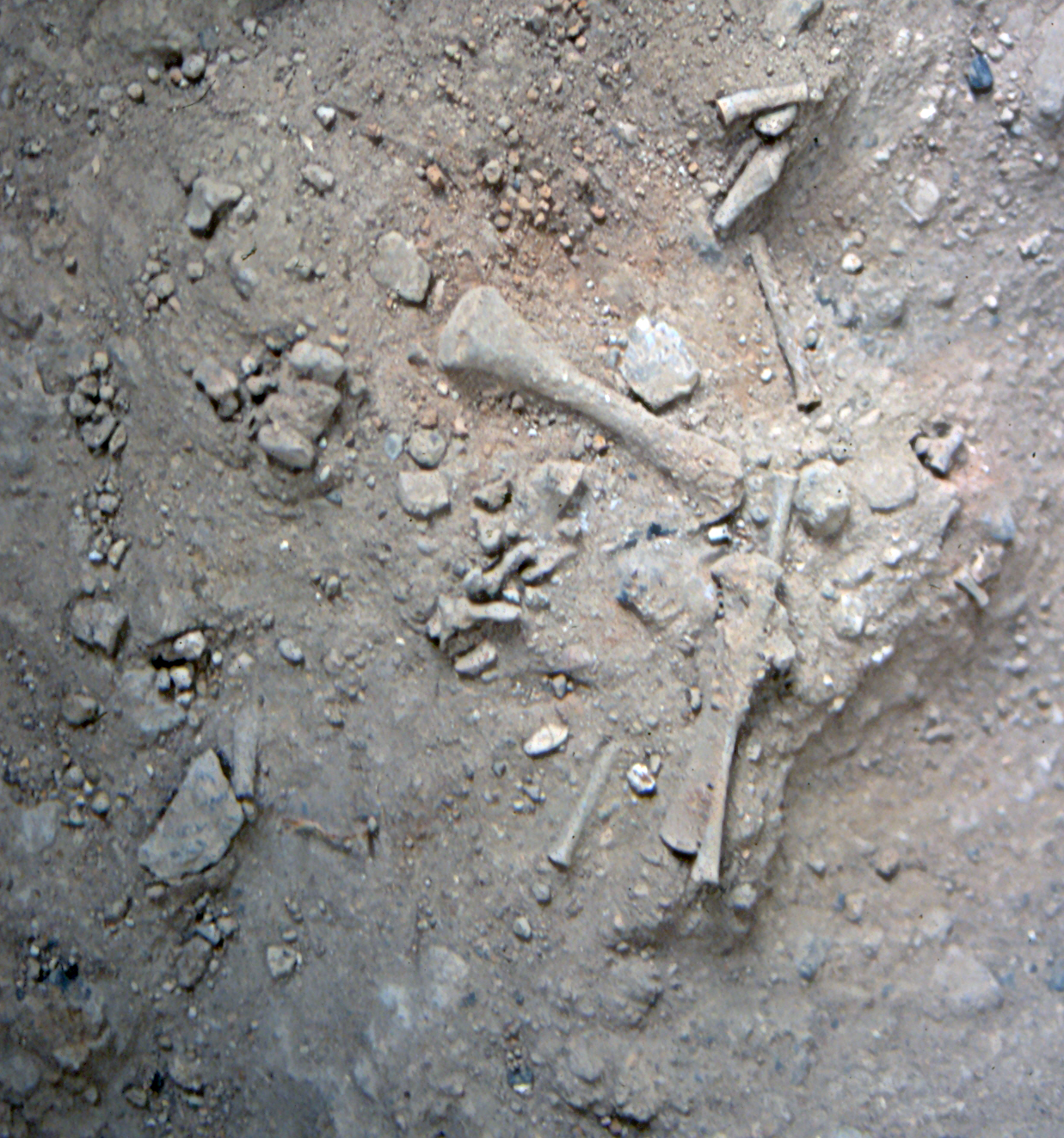
Burial 13. Excavation at phase 1.

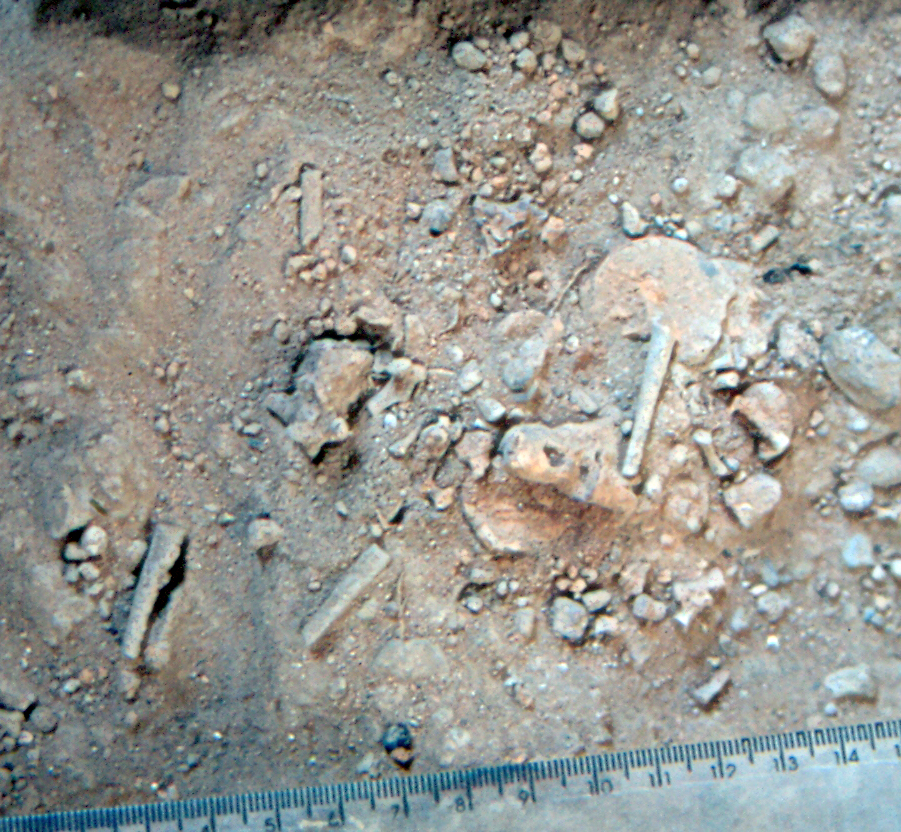
Burial 13. Excavation at phase 3.

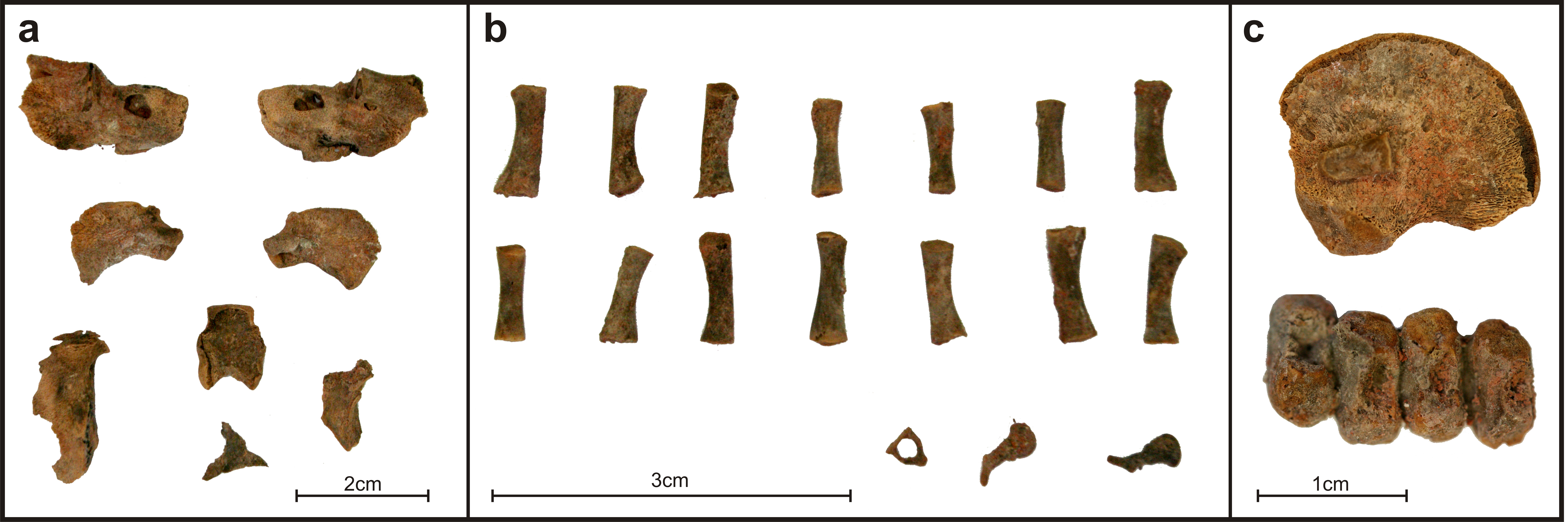
Burial 14. Bones of a baby.
Lapa do Santo - Burial 15

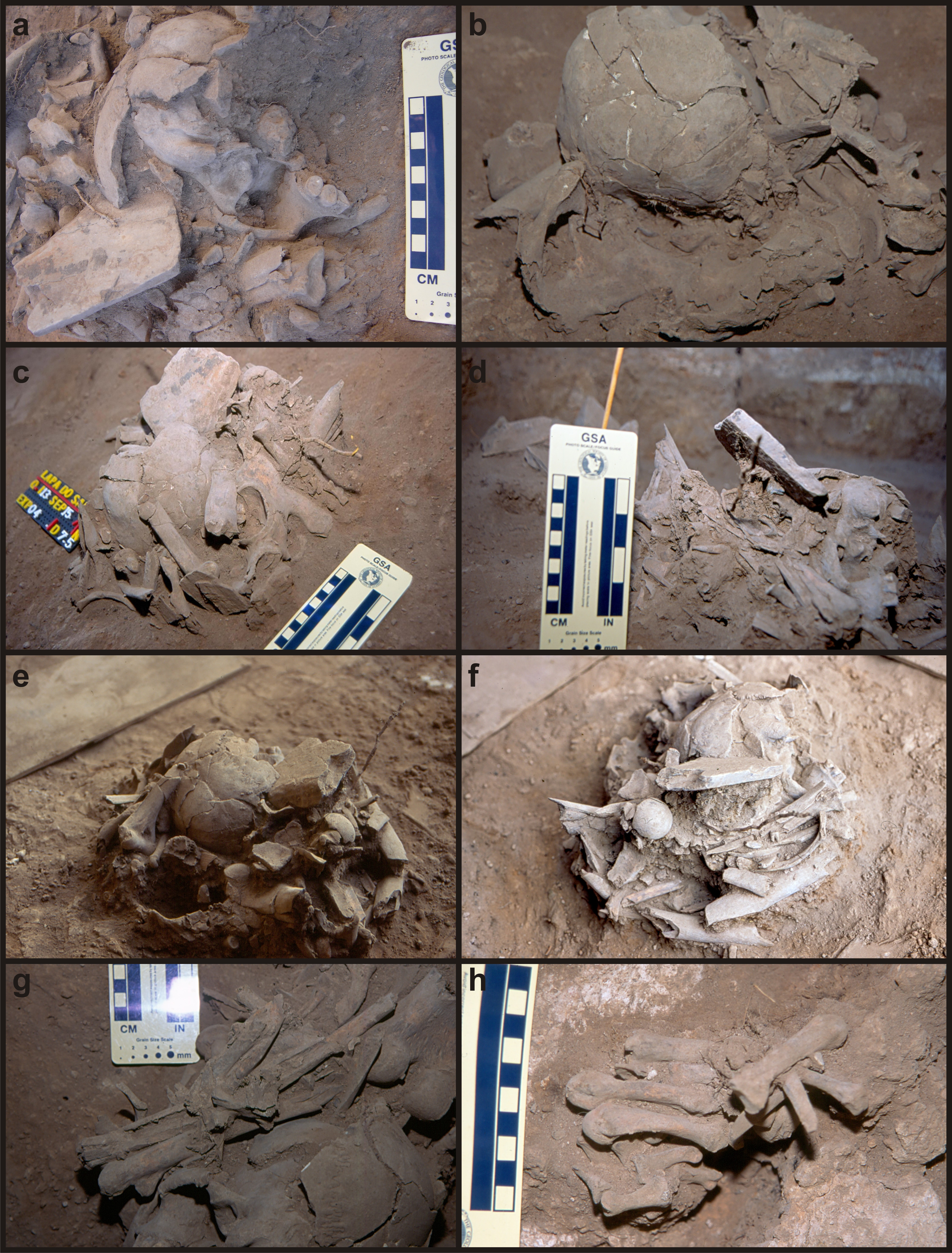
Burial 15. Multiple views of the excavation process.

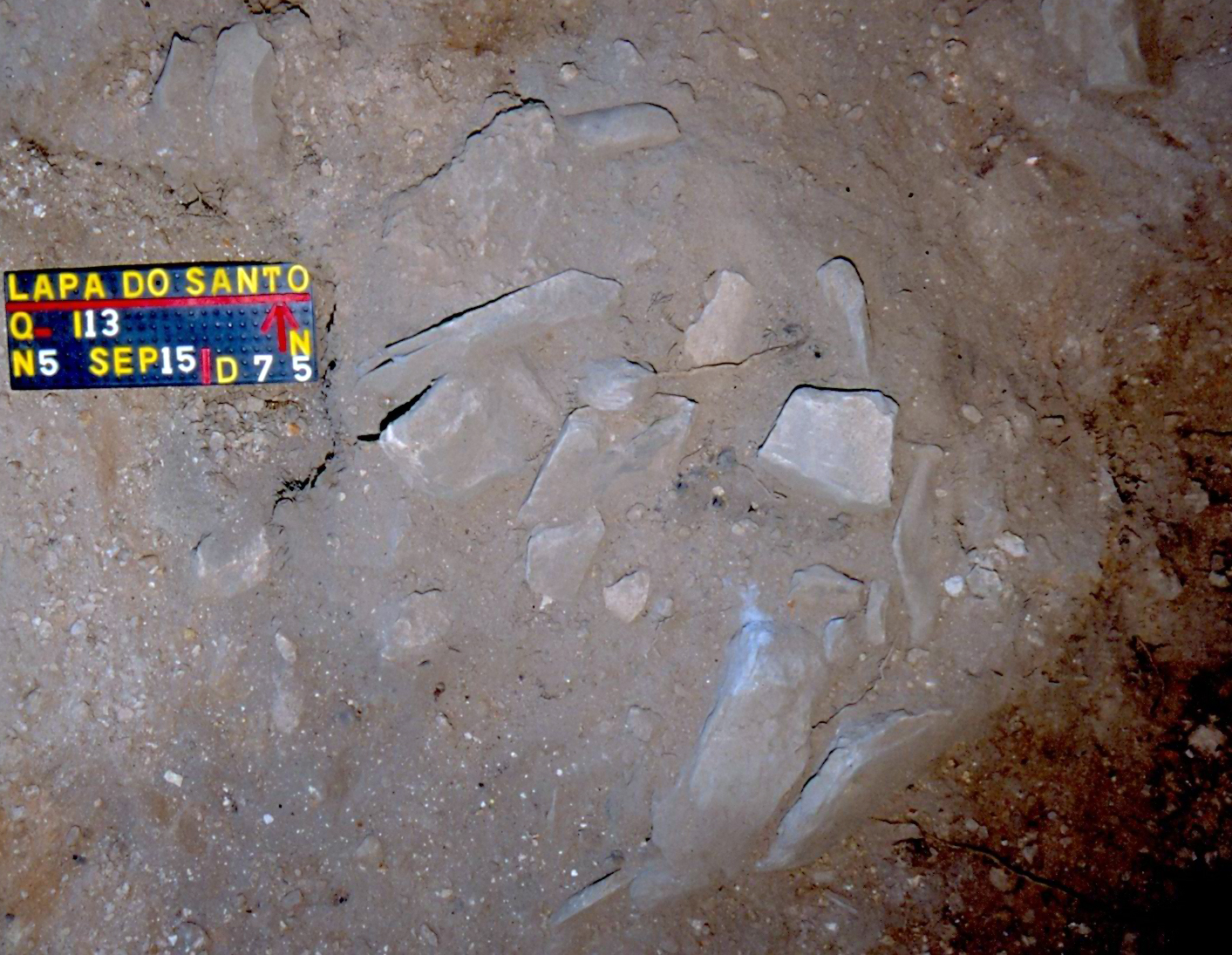
Burial 15. Excavation at exposition 1.

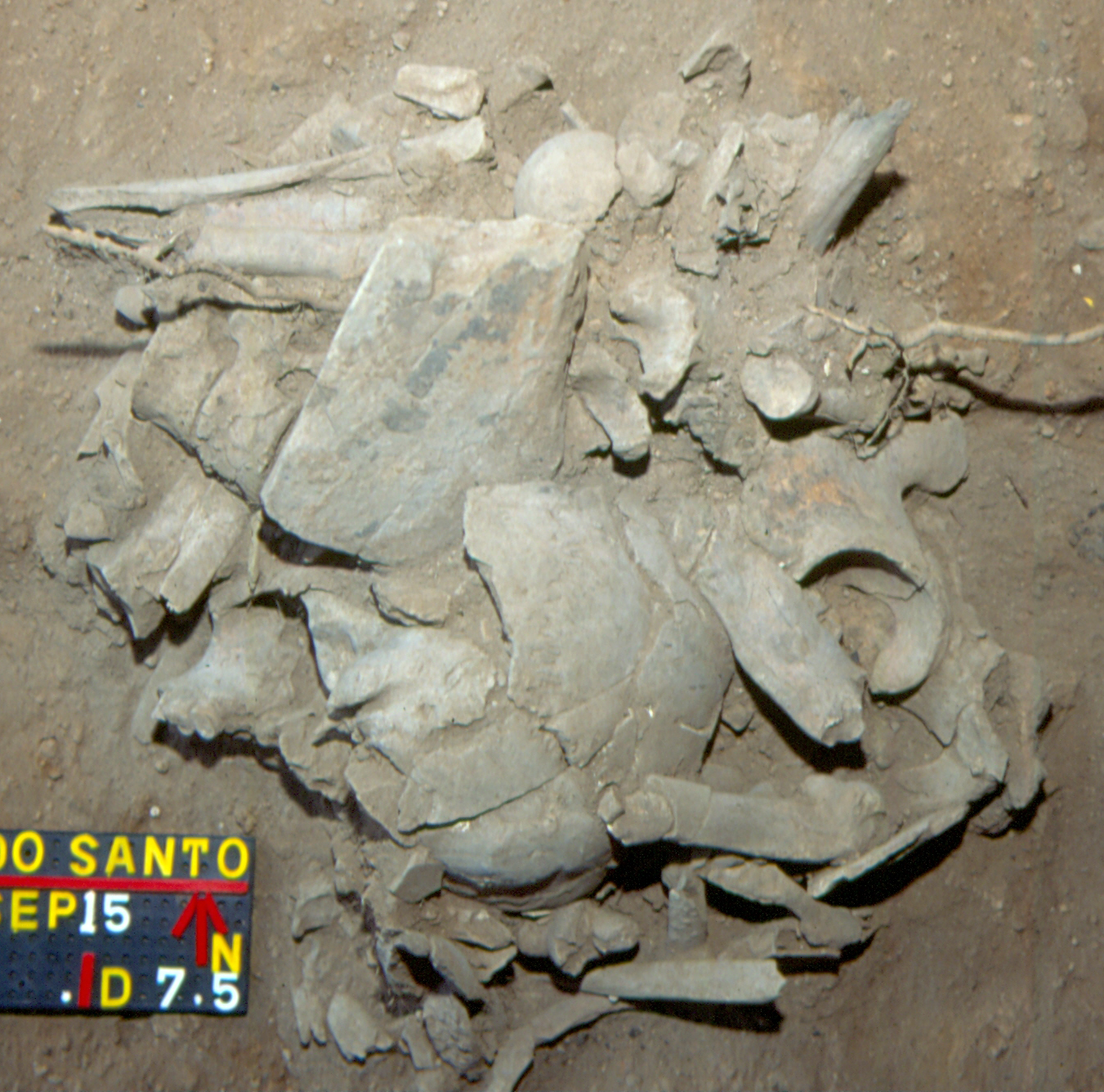
Burial 15. Excavation at exposition 4.

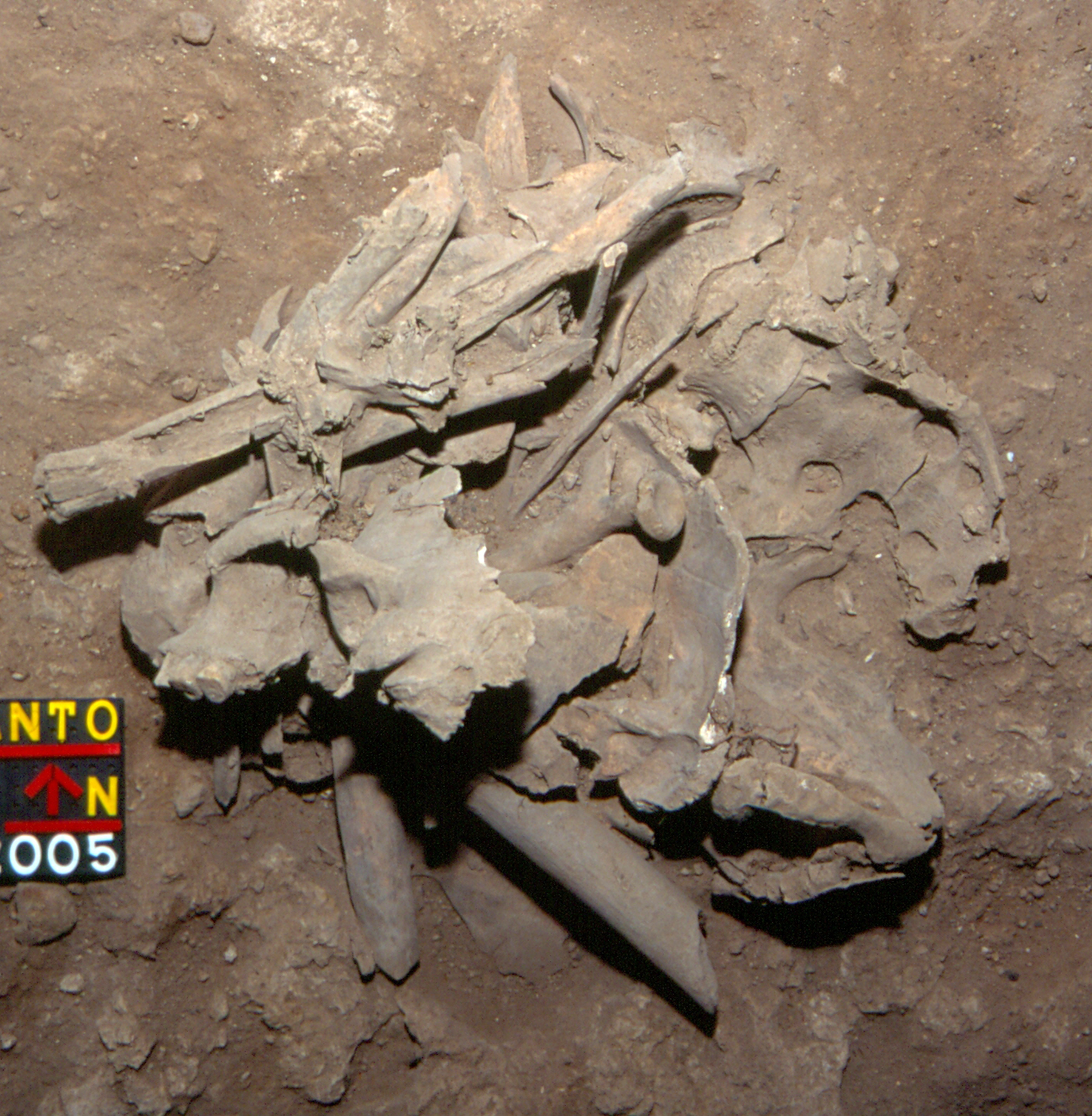
Burial 15. Excavation at exposition 8.

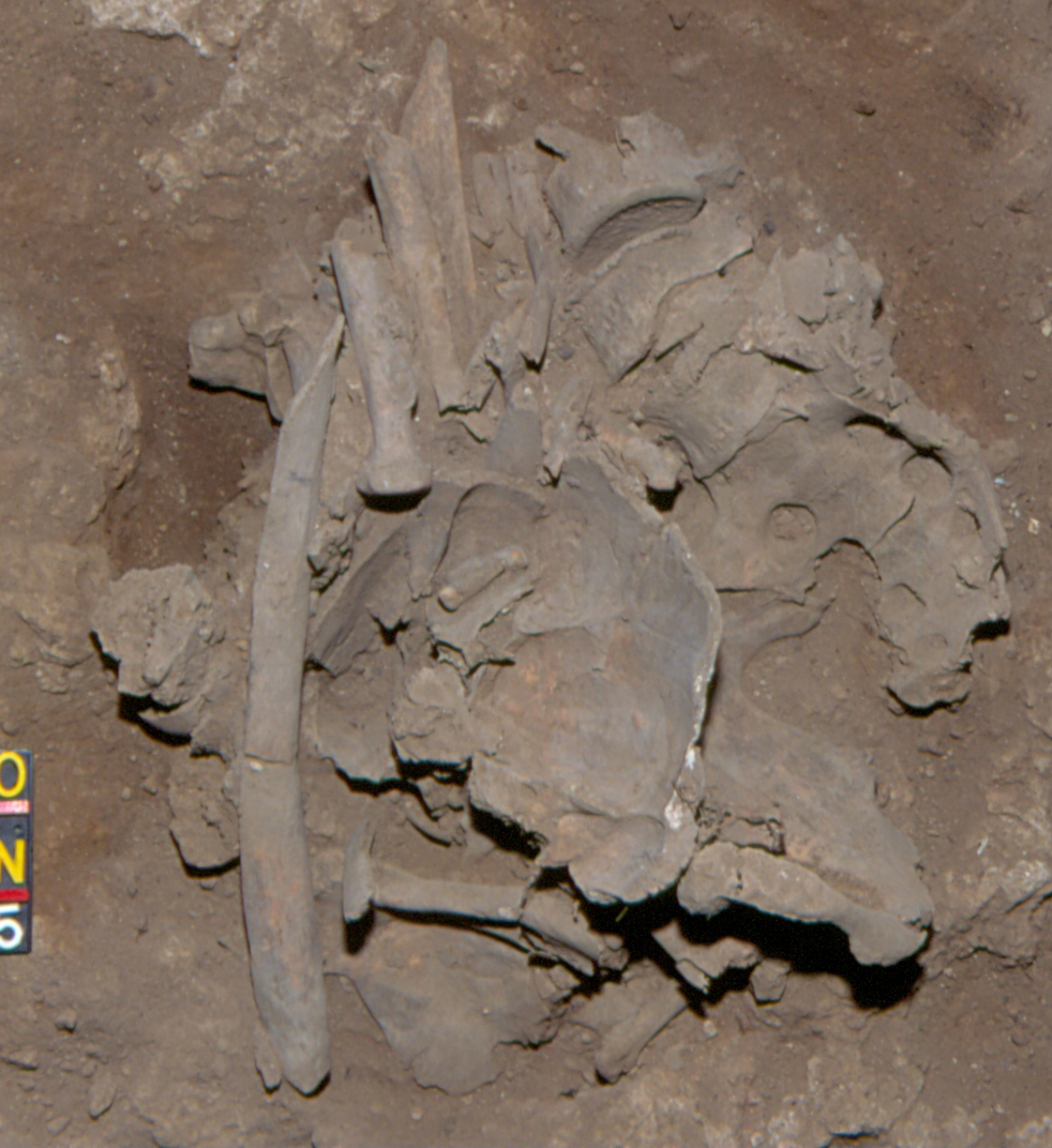
Burial 15. Excavation at exposition 9.

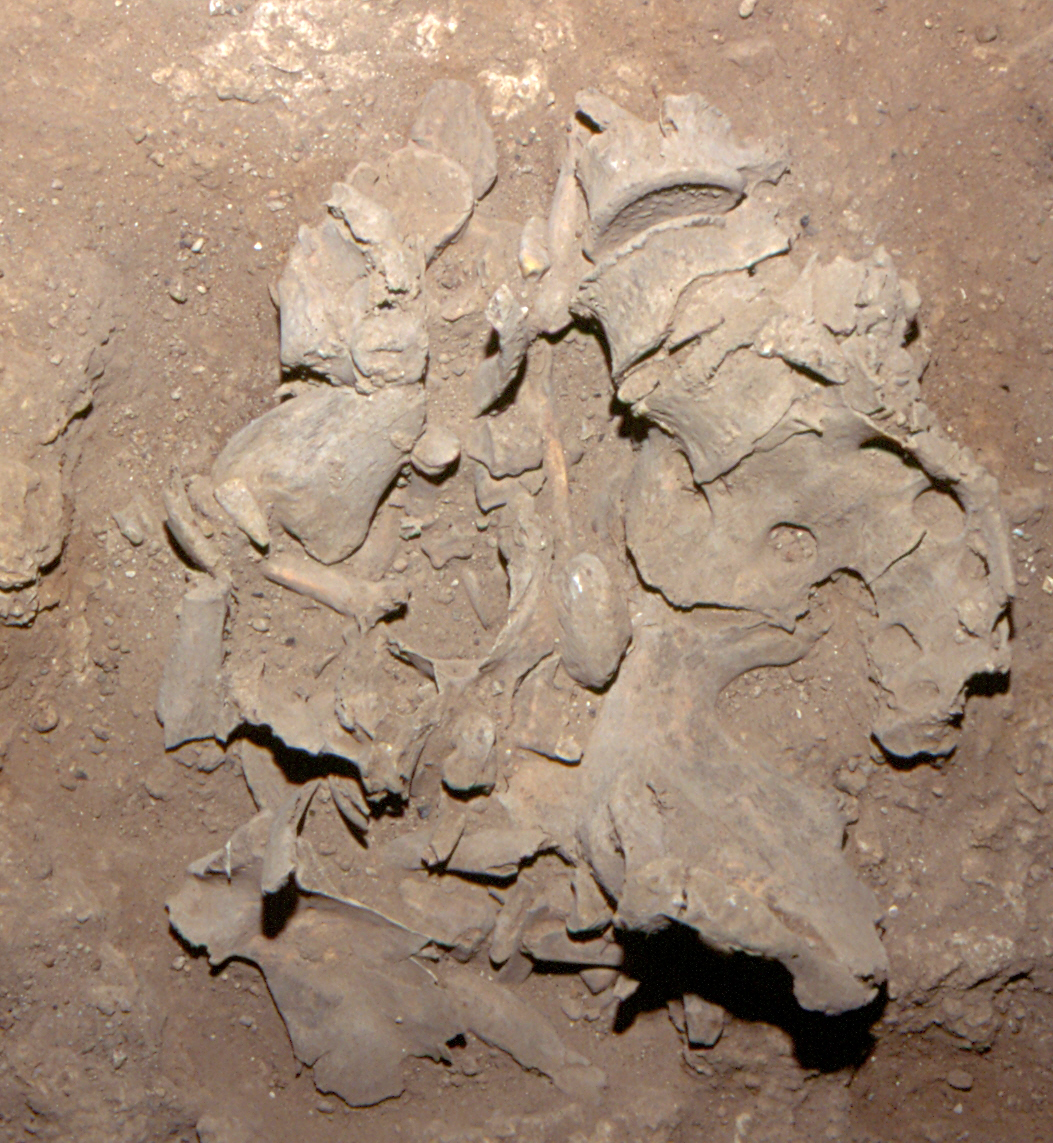
Burial 15. Excavation at exposition 10.

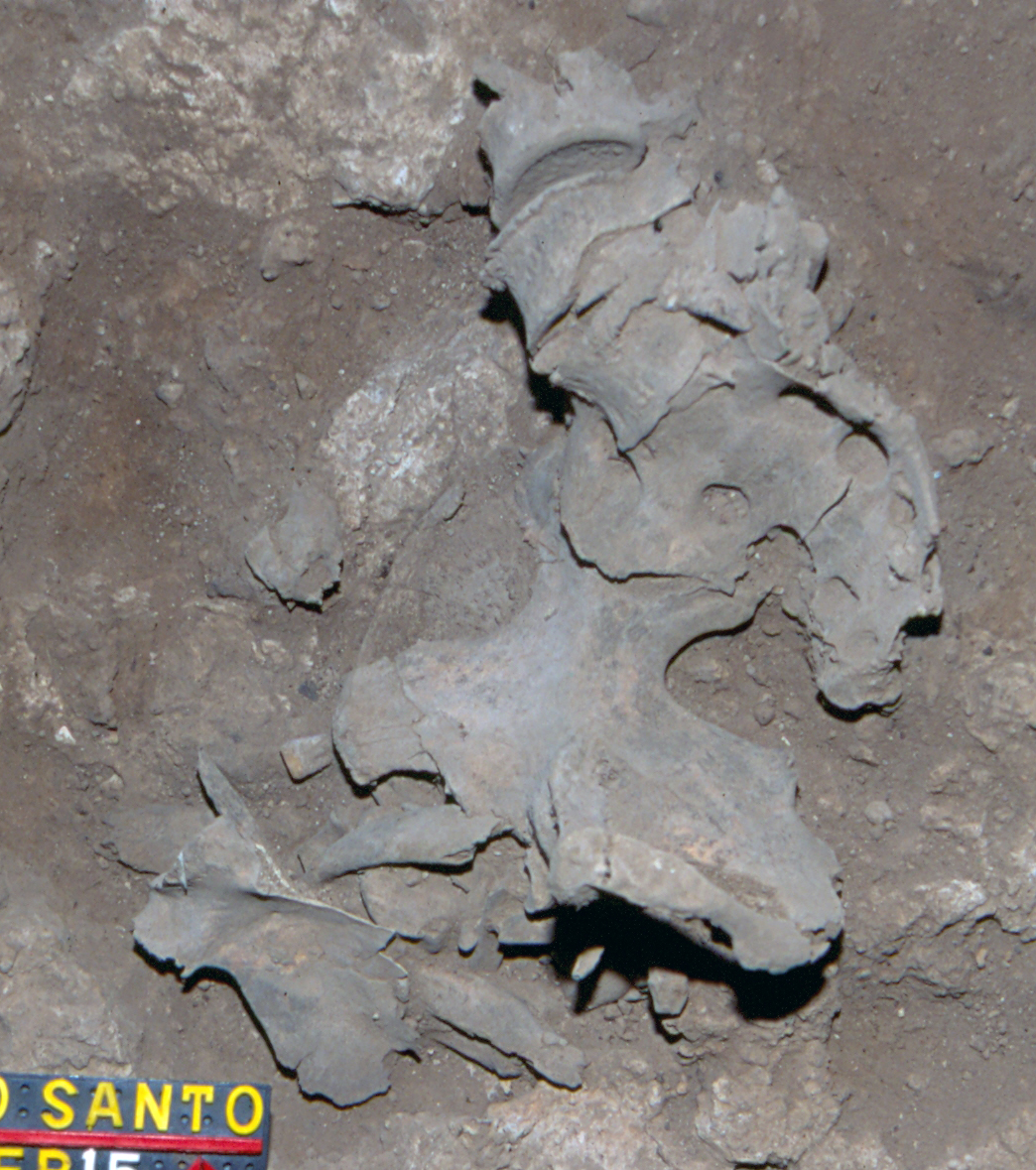
Burial 15. Excavation at exposition 11.

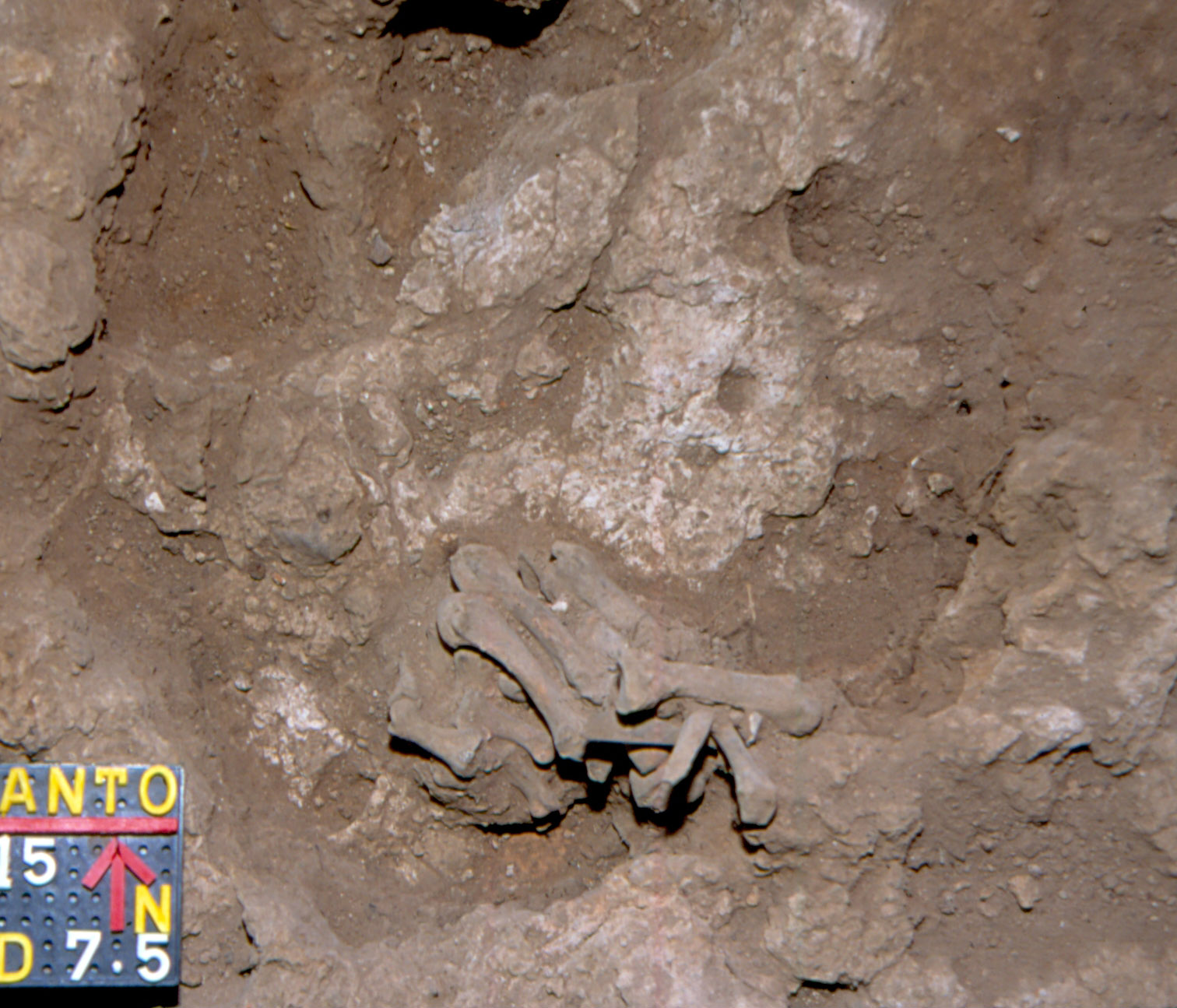
Burial 15. Excavation at exposition 12.

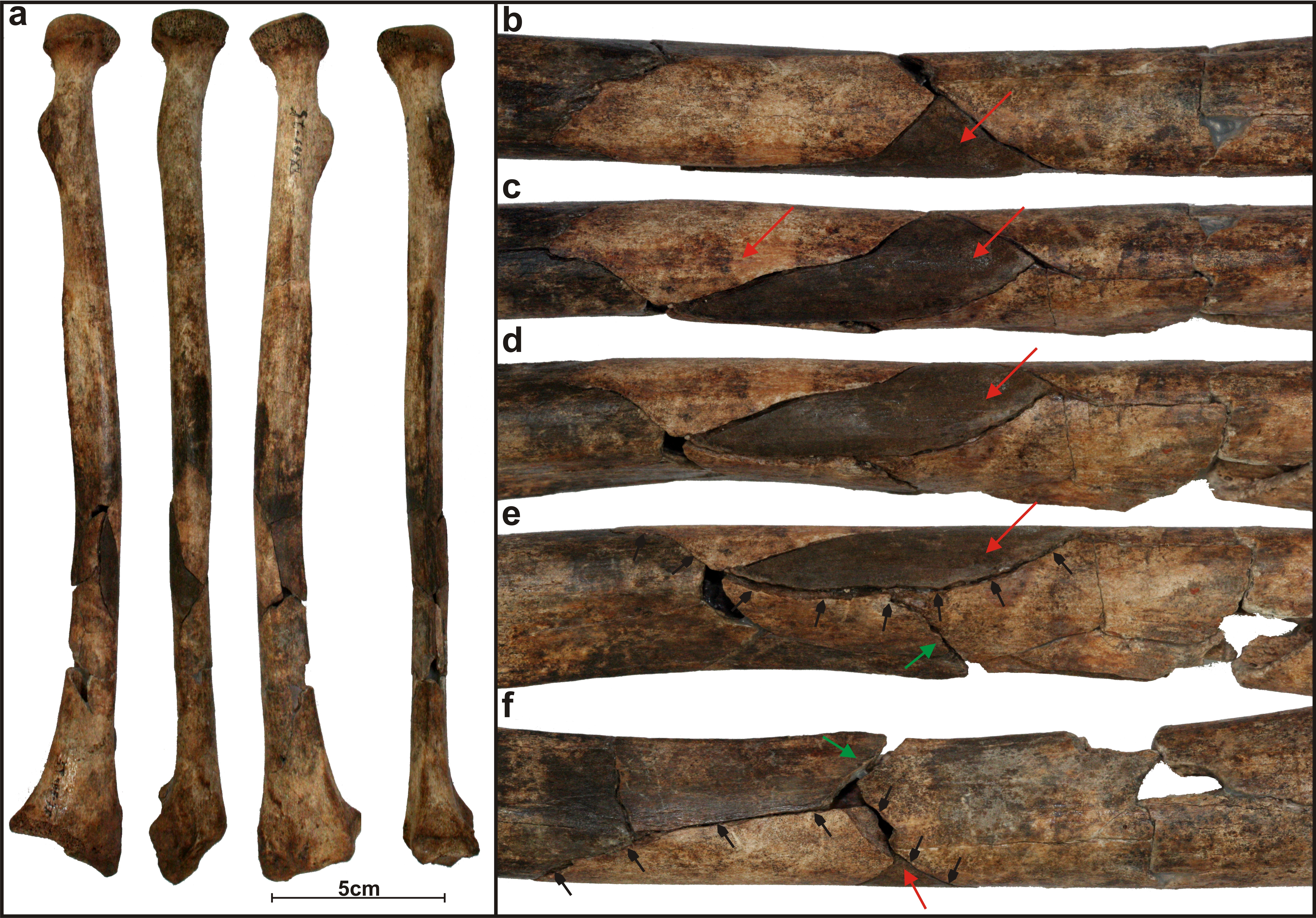
Burial 15. Perimortem fractures on the left radius

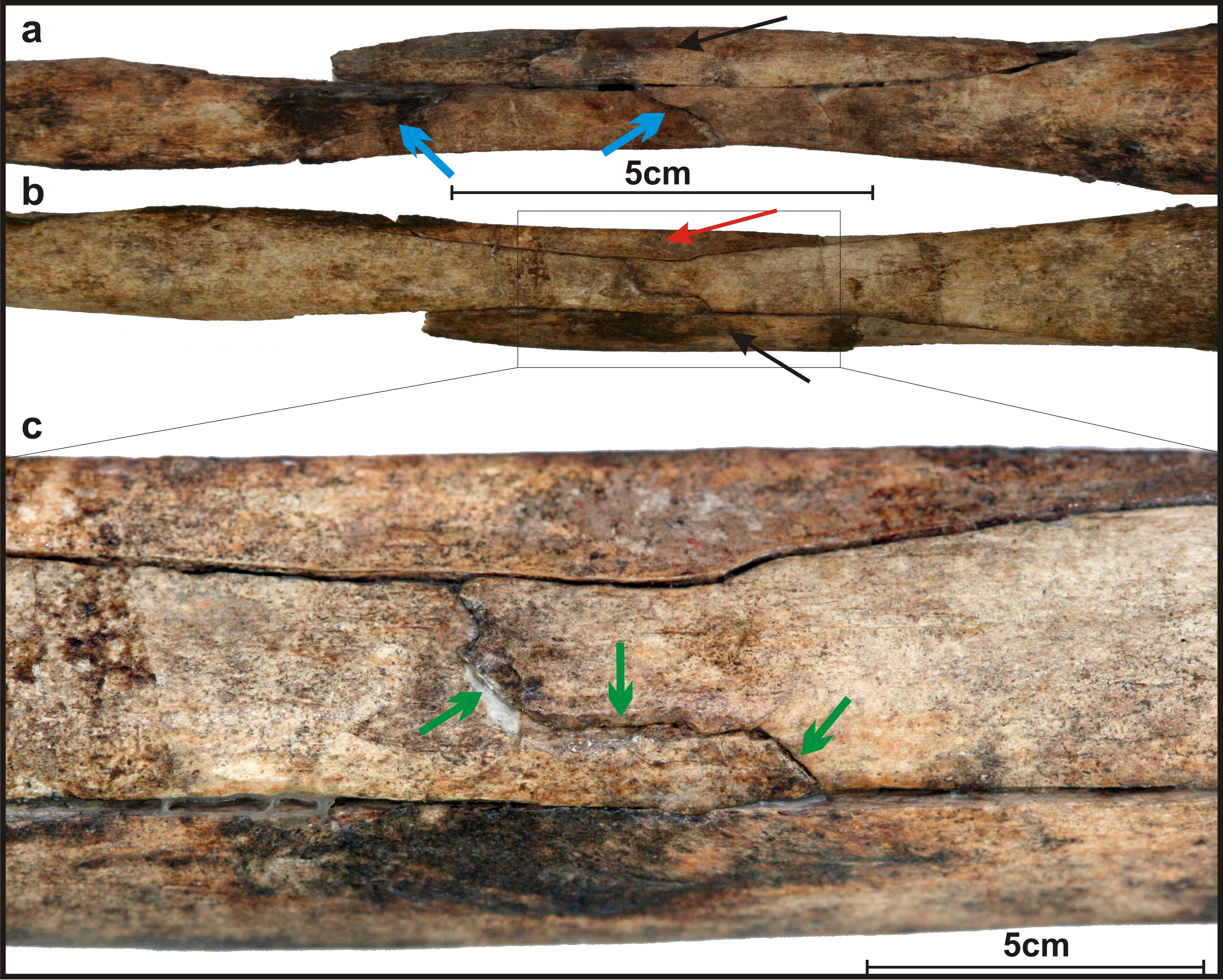
Burial 15. Perimortem fractures on the right radius

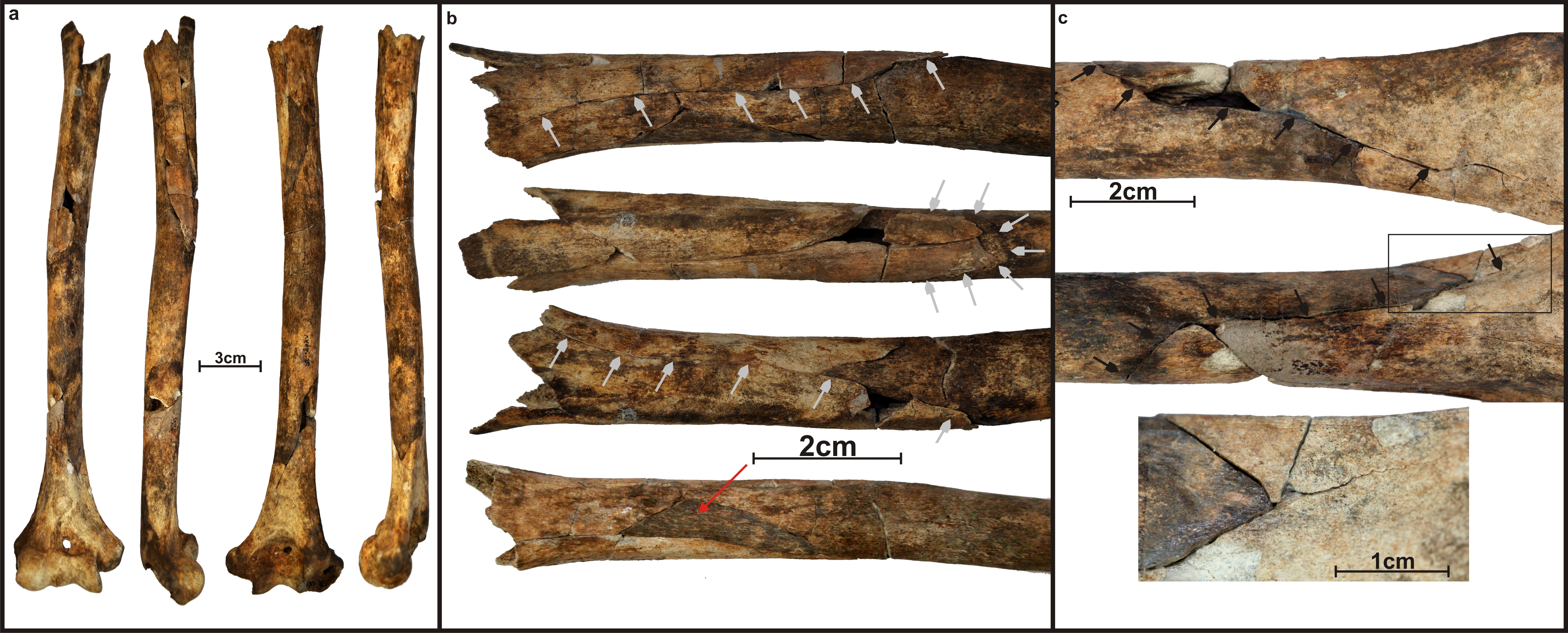
Burial 15. Perimortem fracture on the right humerus.

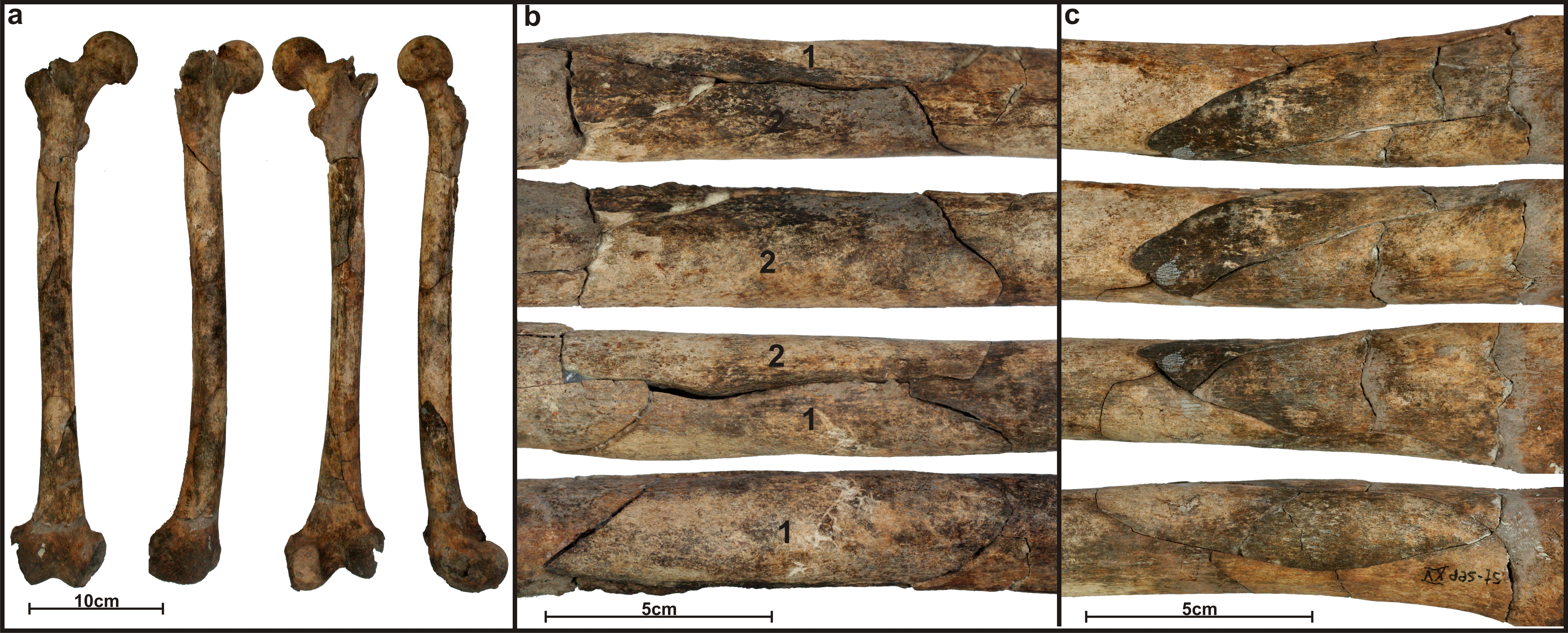
Burial 15. Perimortem fractures on the right femur

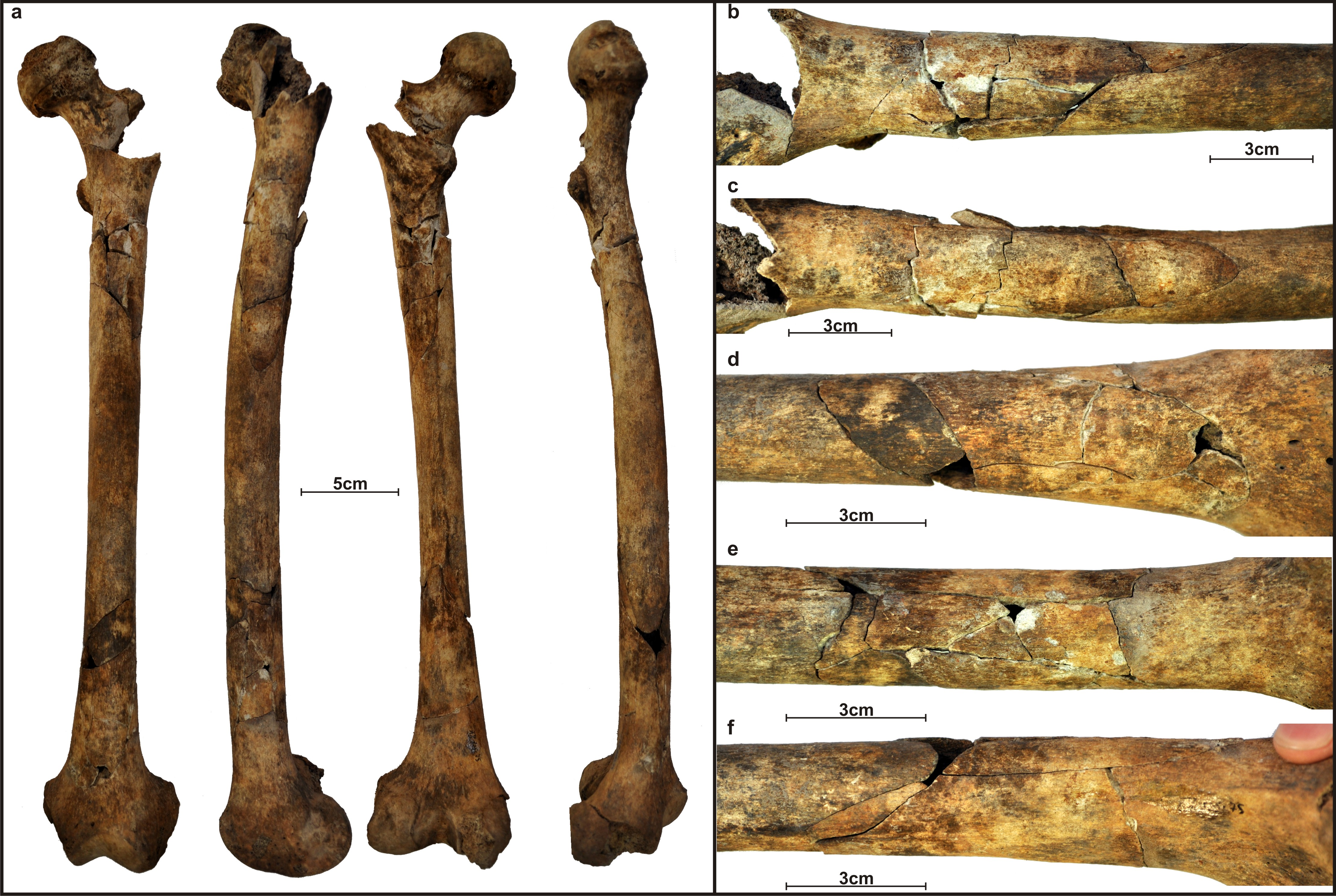
Burial 15. Perimortem fractures on the left femur.

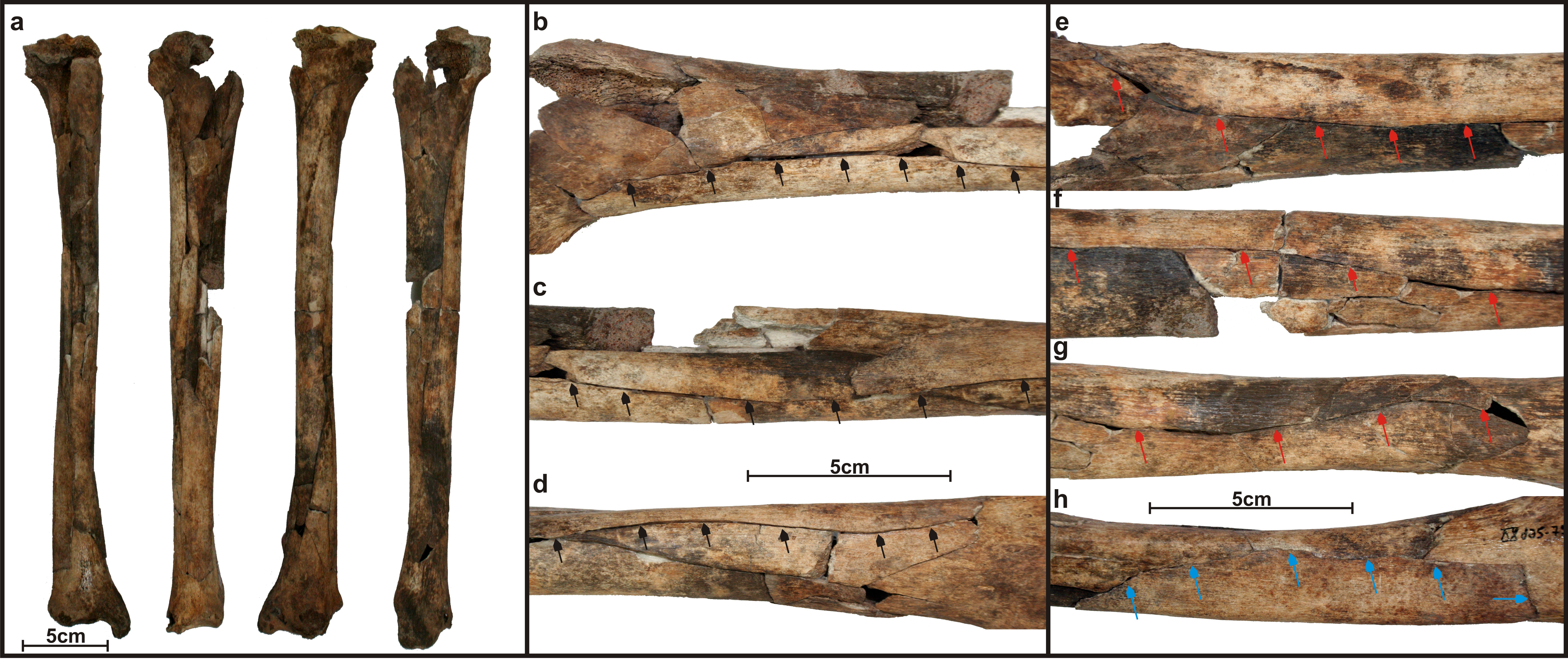
Burial 15. Perimortem fractures on the right tibia

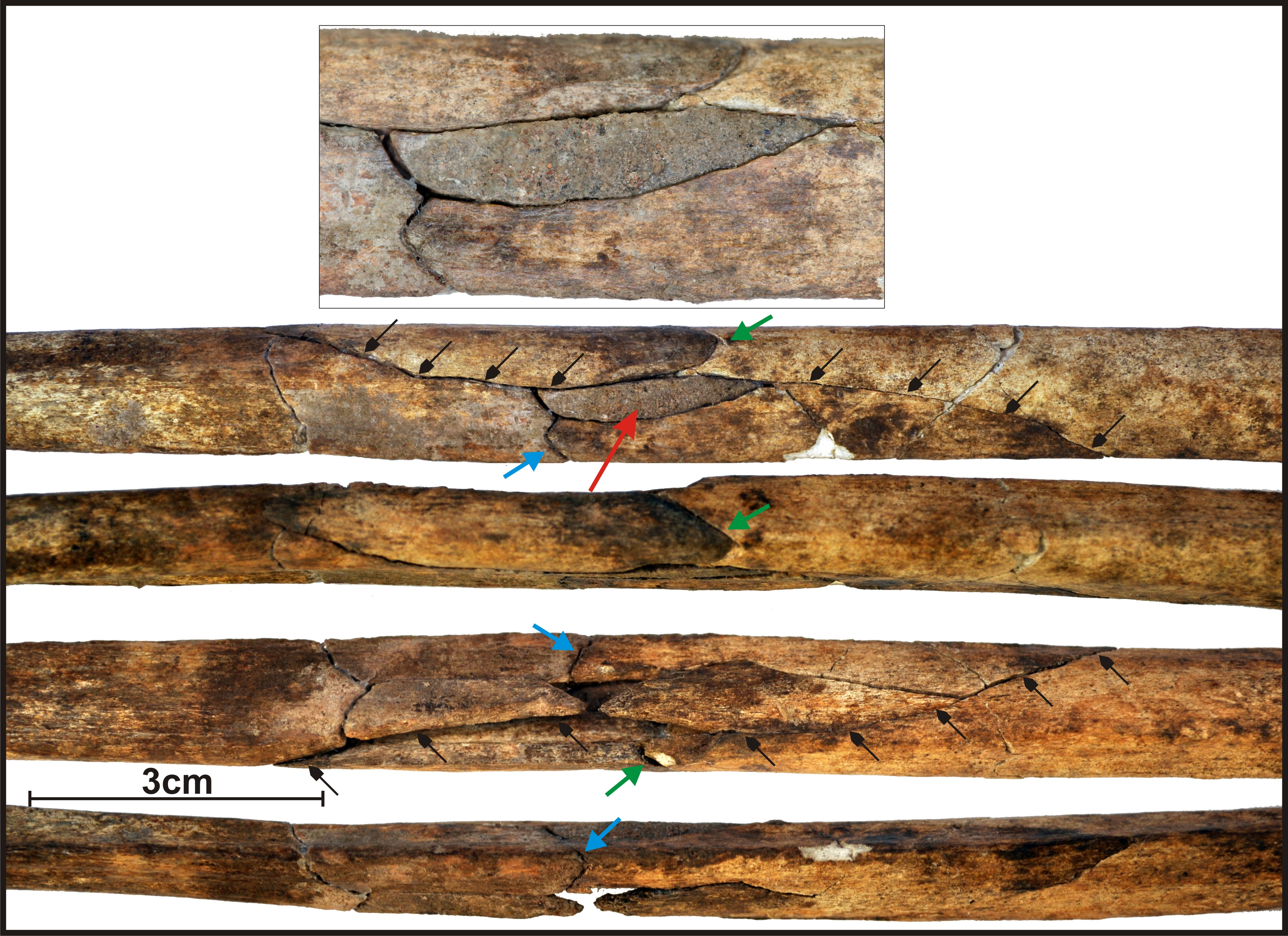
Burial 15. Perimortem fractures on the right fibula
Lapa do Santo - Burial 19

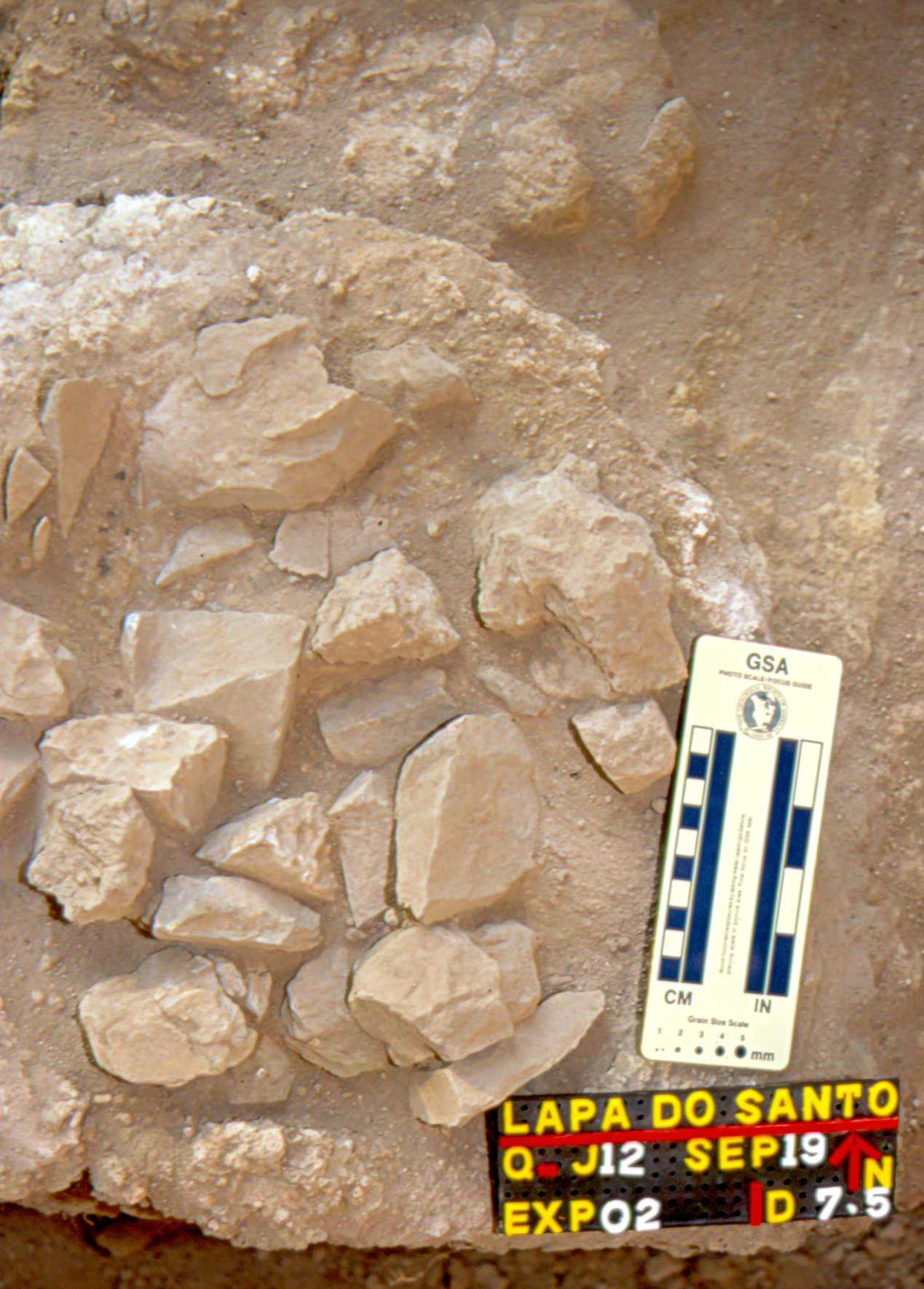
Burial 19. Blocks were on top of the skeleton.

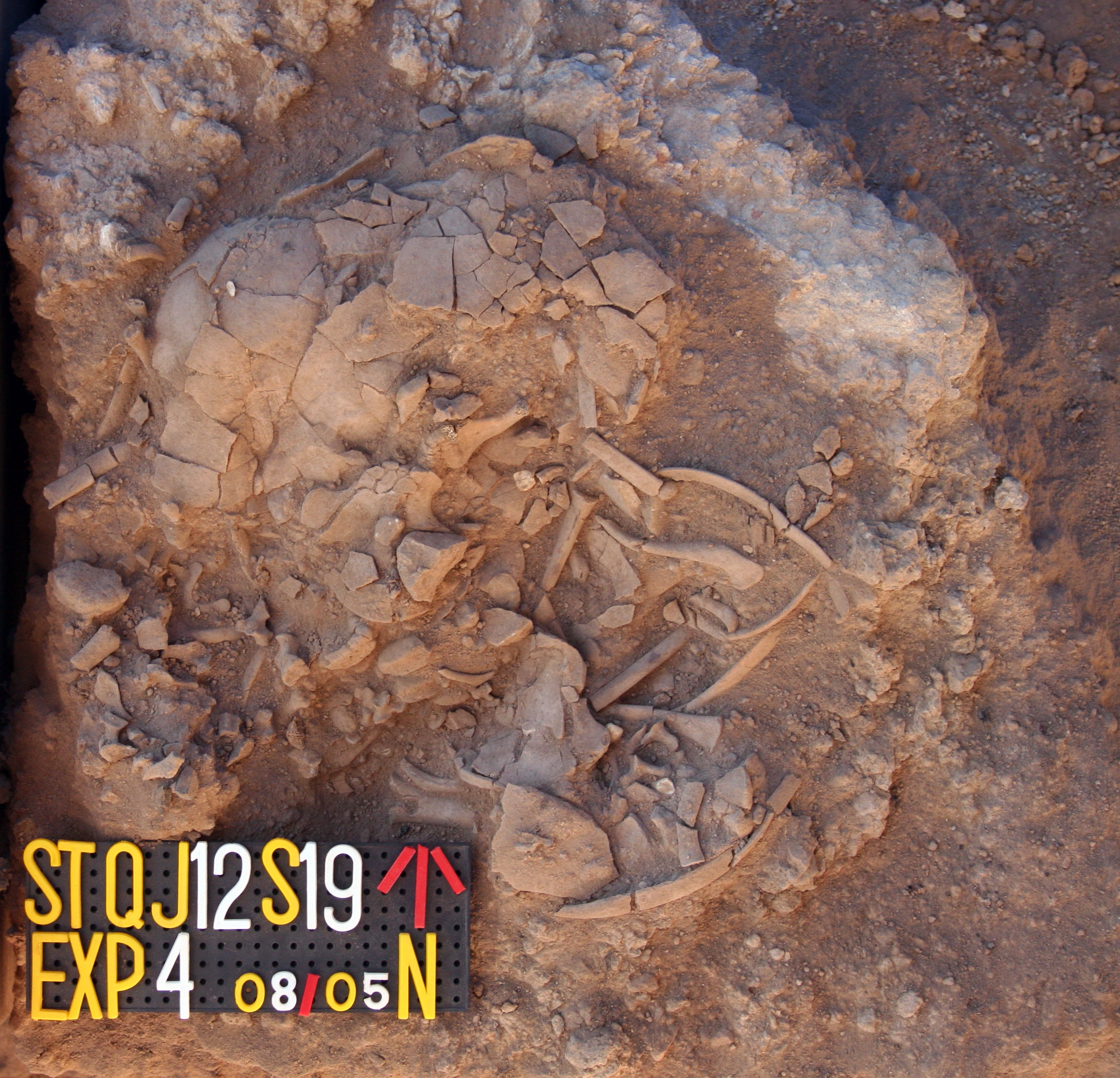
Burial 19. Excavation at phase 4.

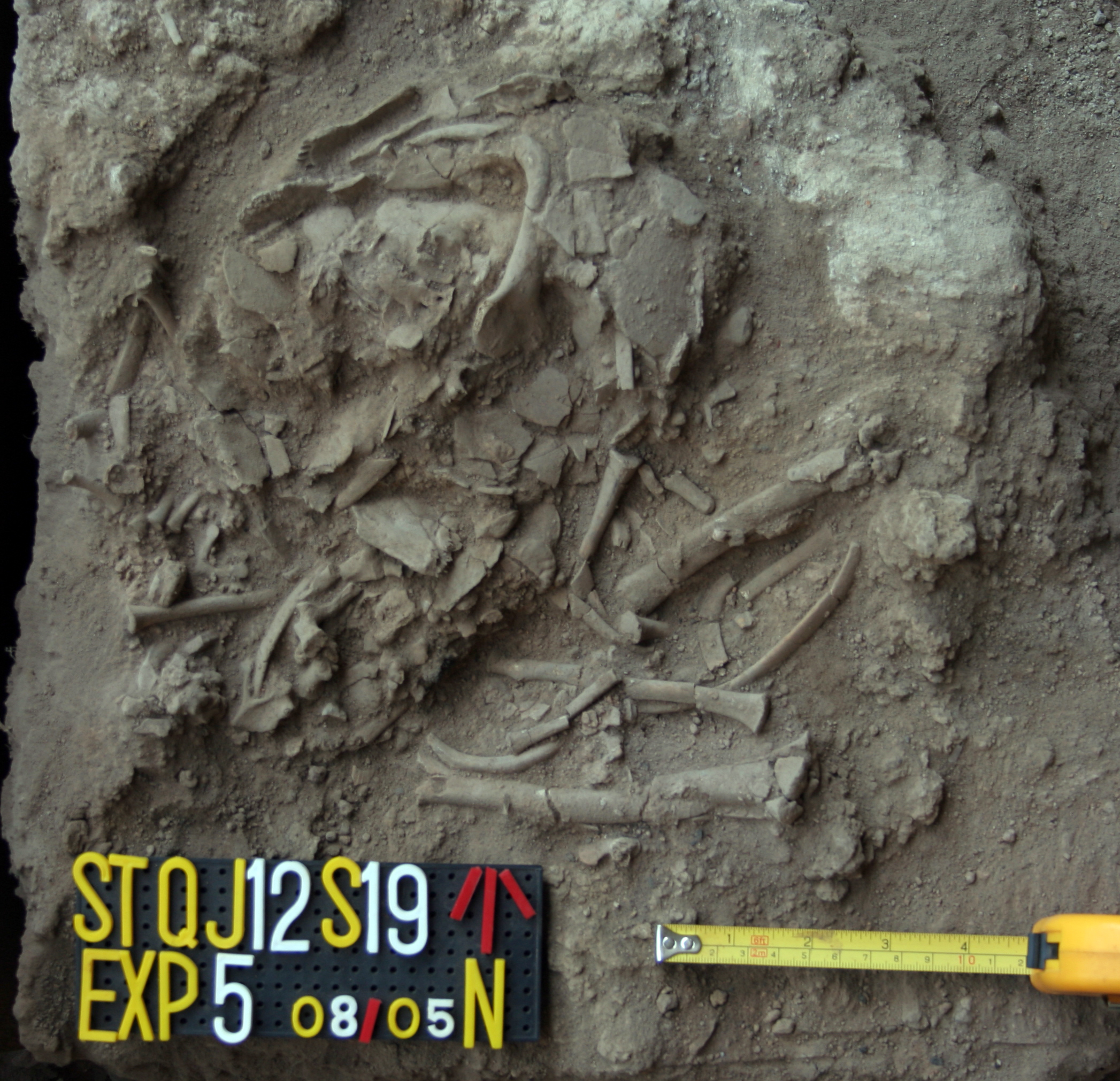
Burial 19. Excavation at phase 5.

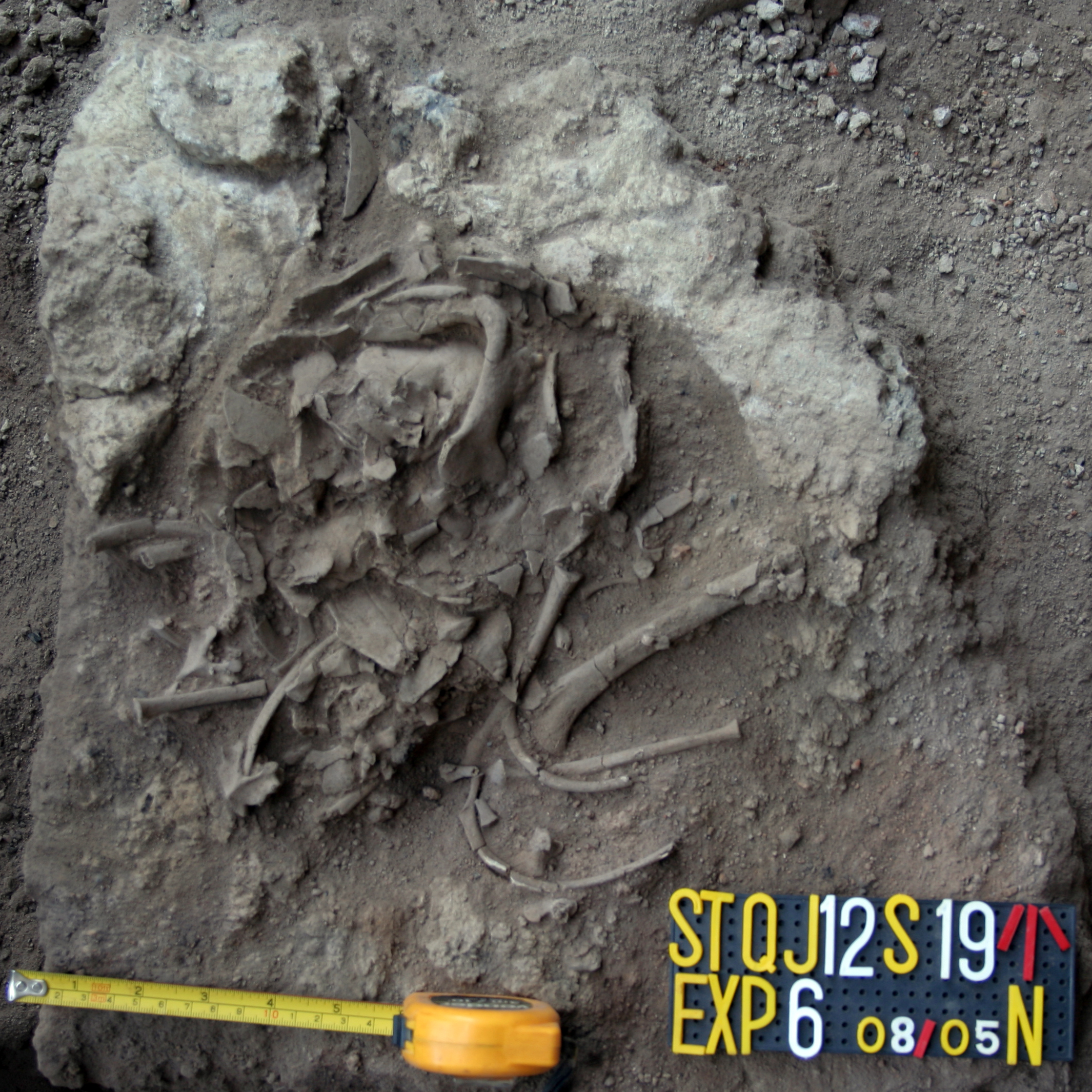
Burial 19. Excavation at phase 6.

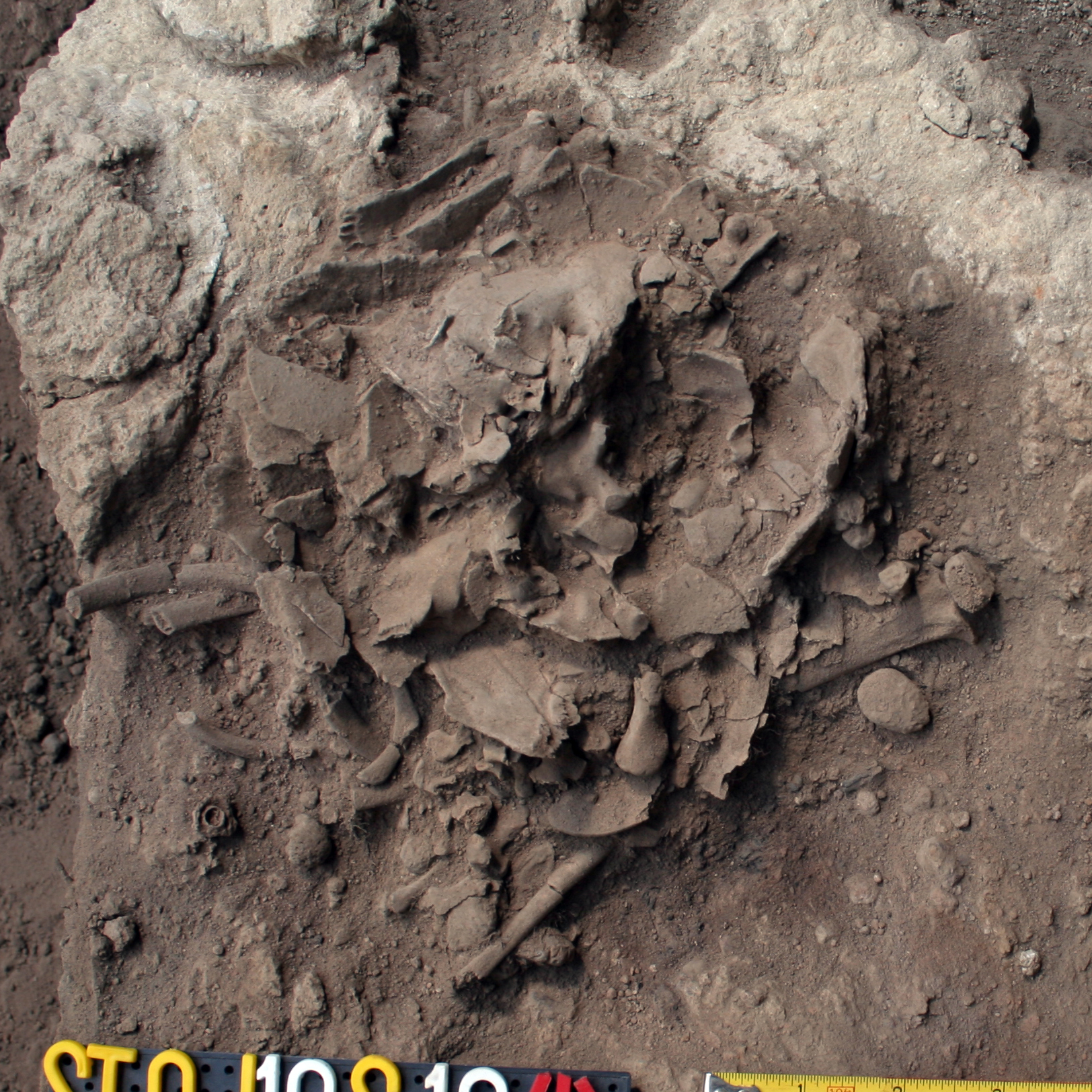
Burial 19. Excavation at phase 7.

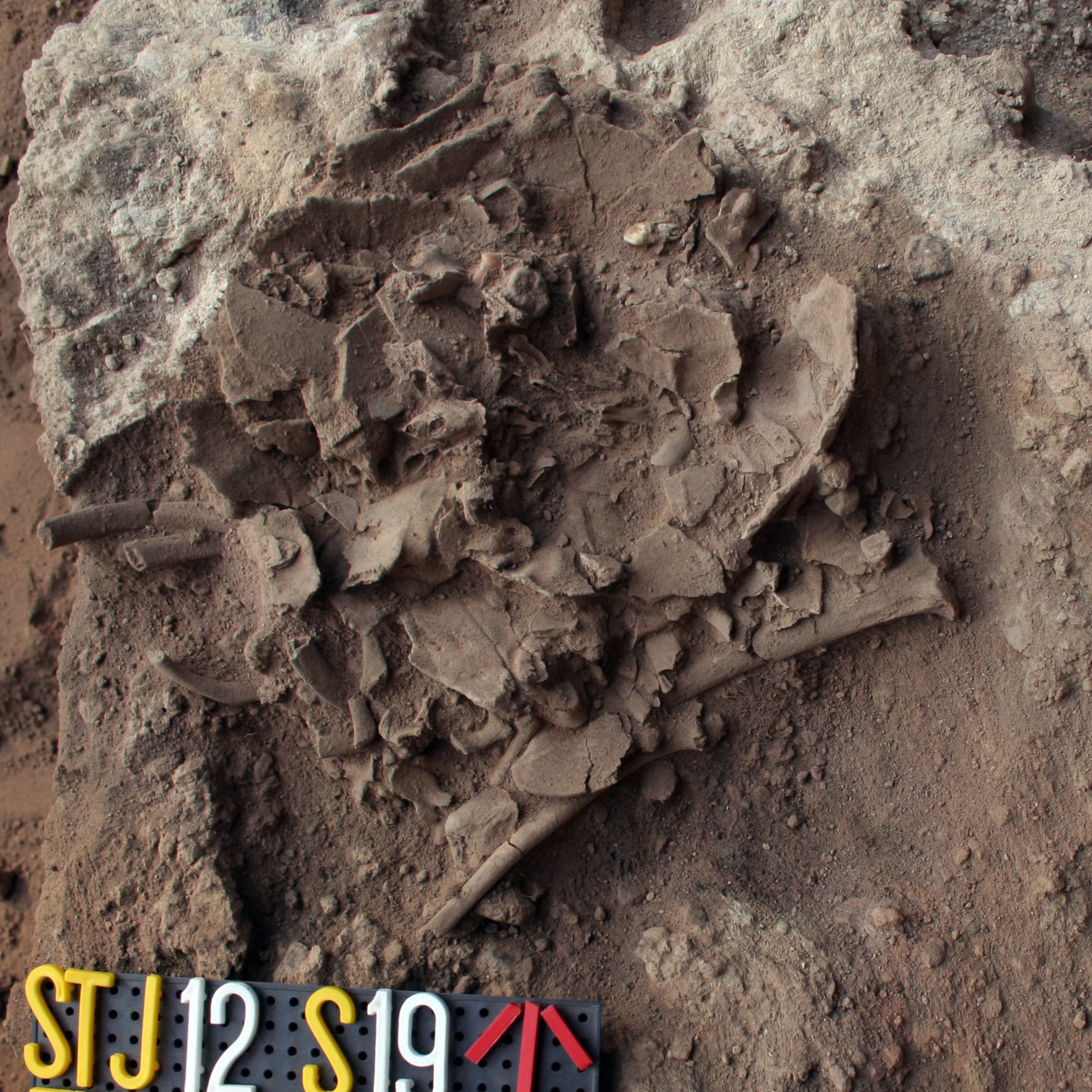
Burial 19. Excavation at phase 8.

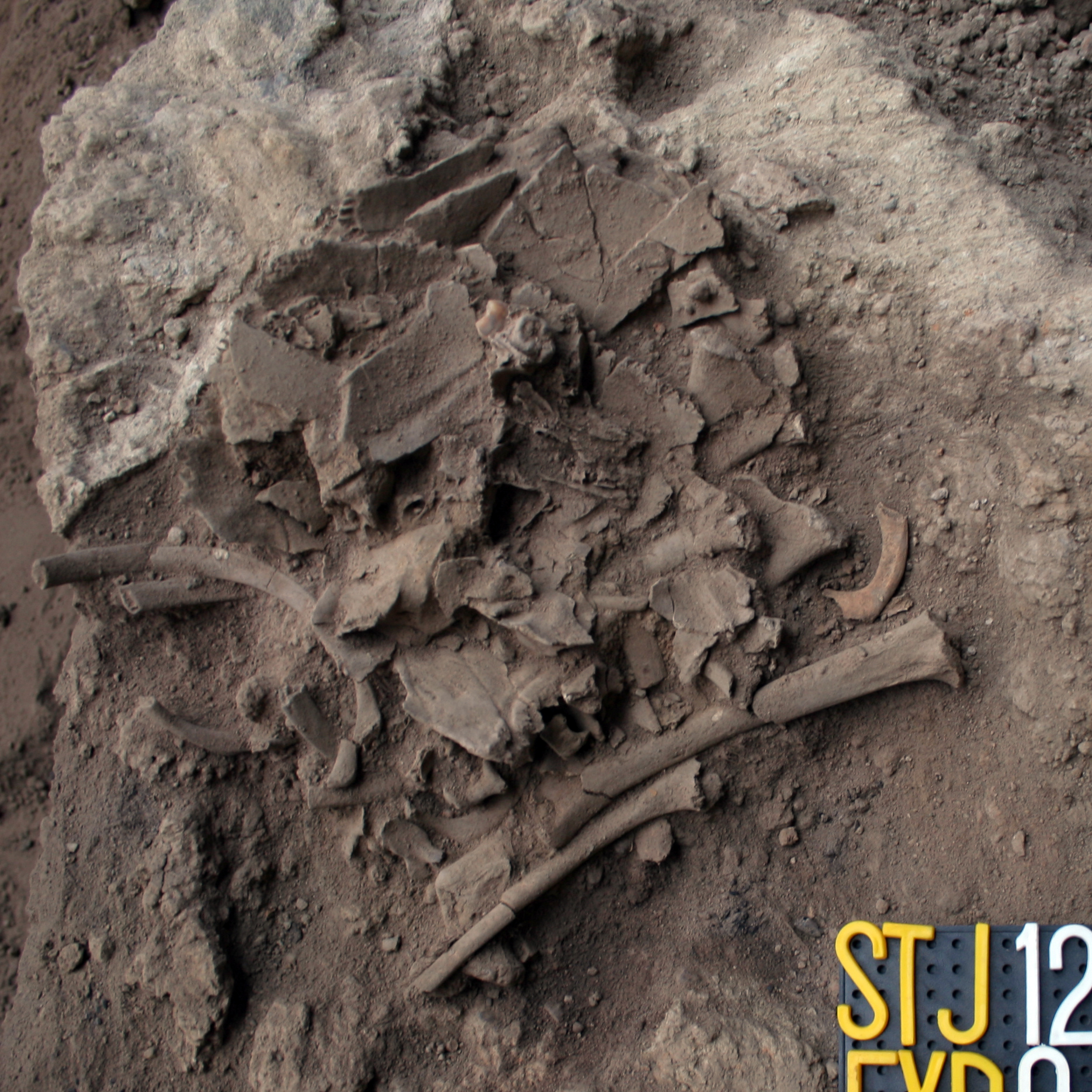
Burial 19. Excavation at phase 9.

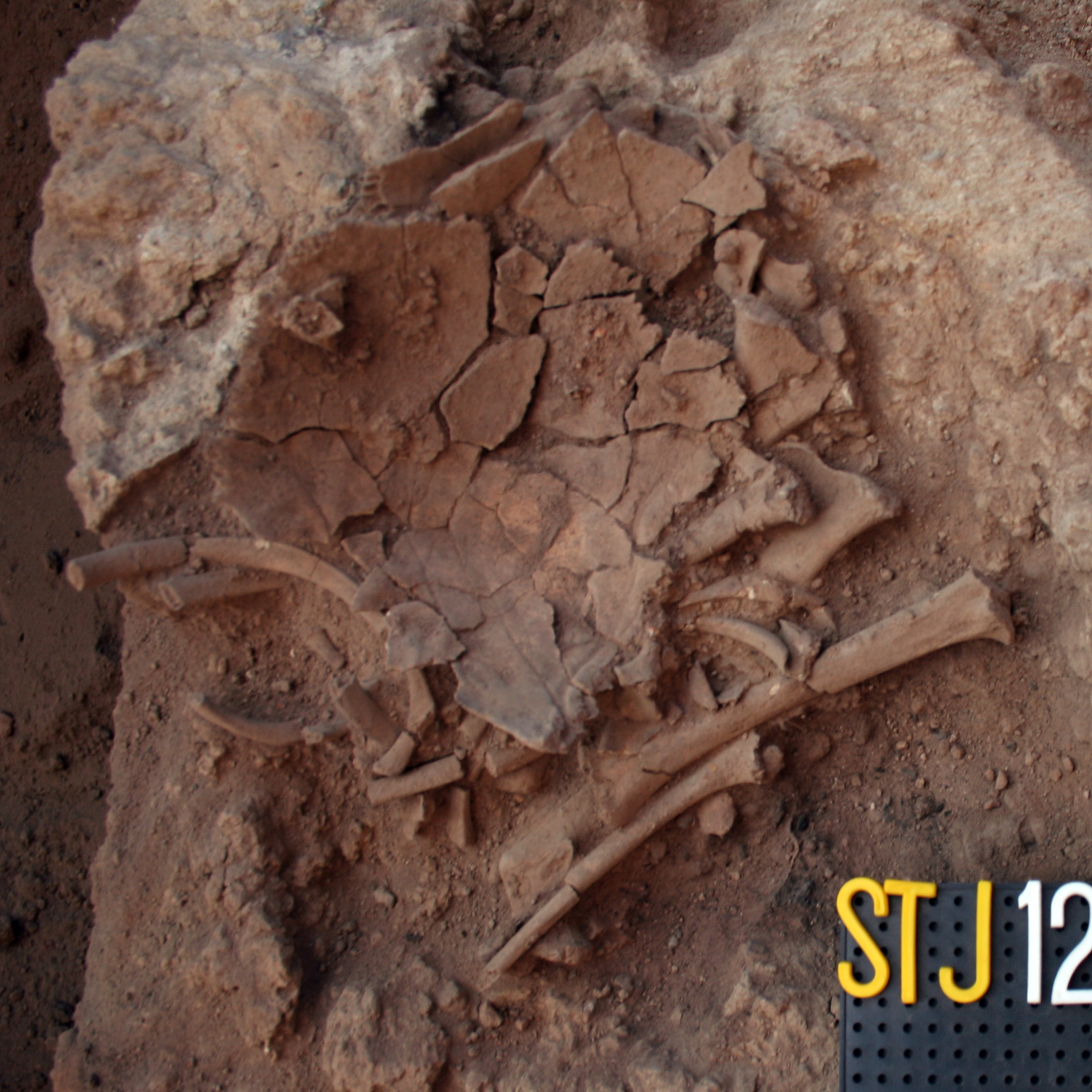
Burial 19. Excavation at phase 10.

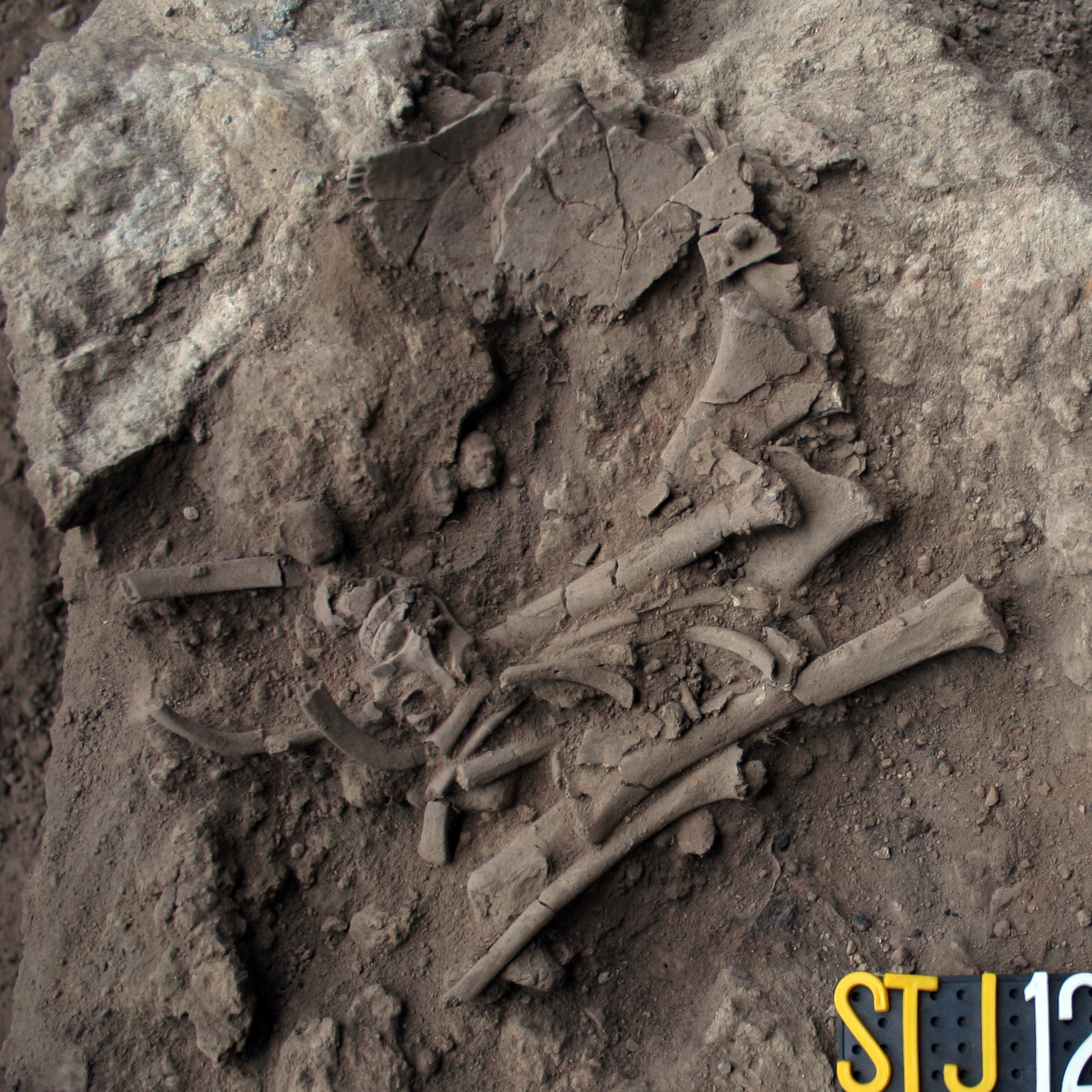
Burial 19. Excavation at phase 11.

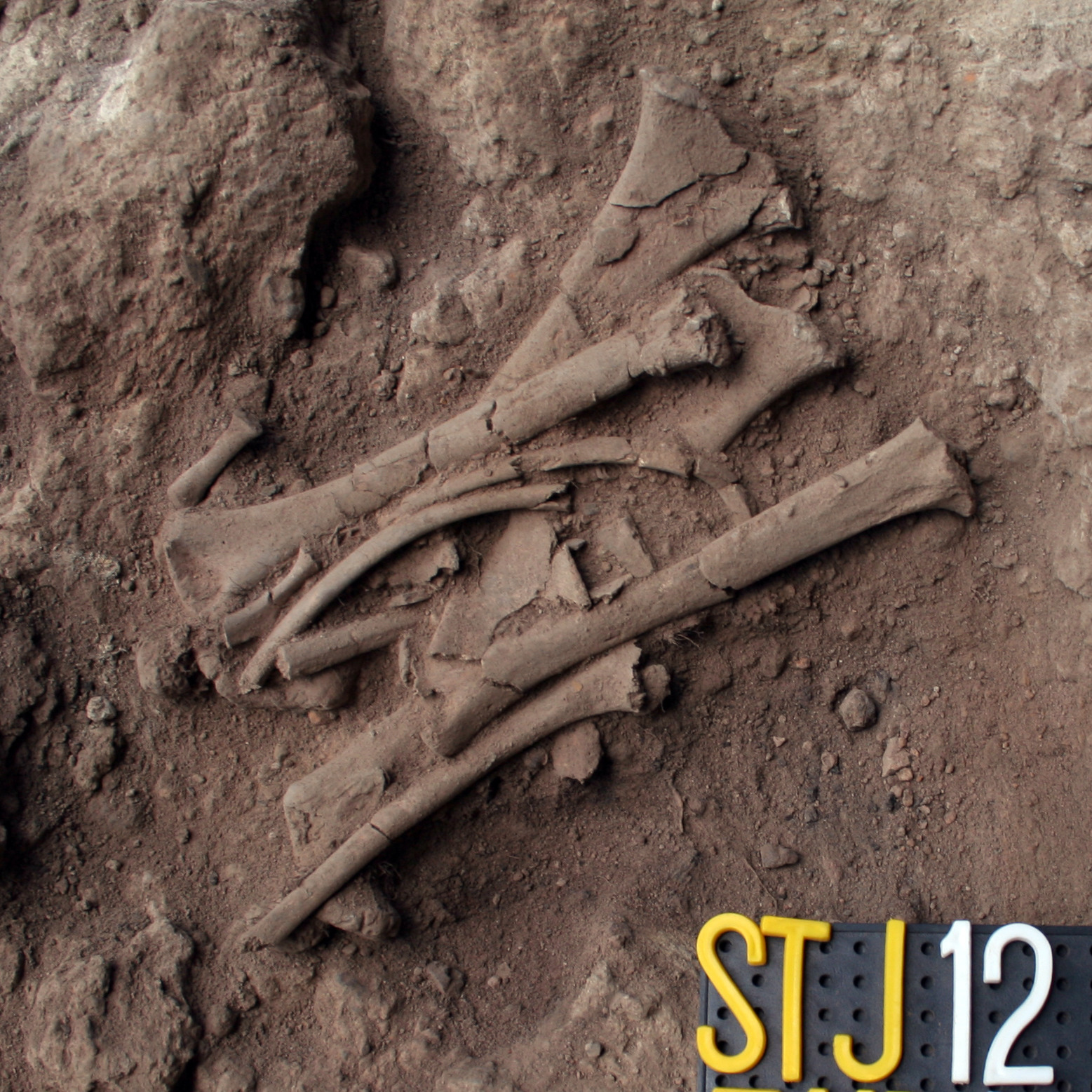
Burial 19. Excavation at phase 12.

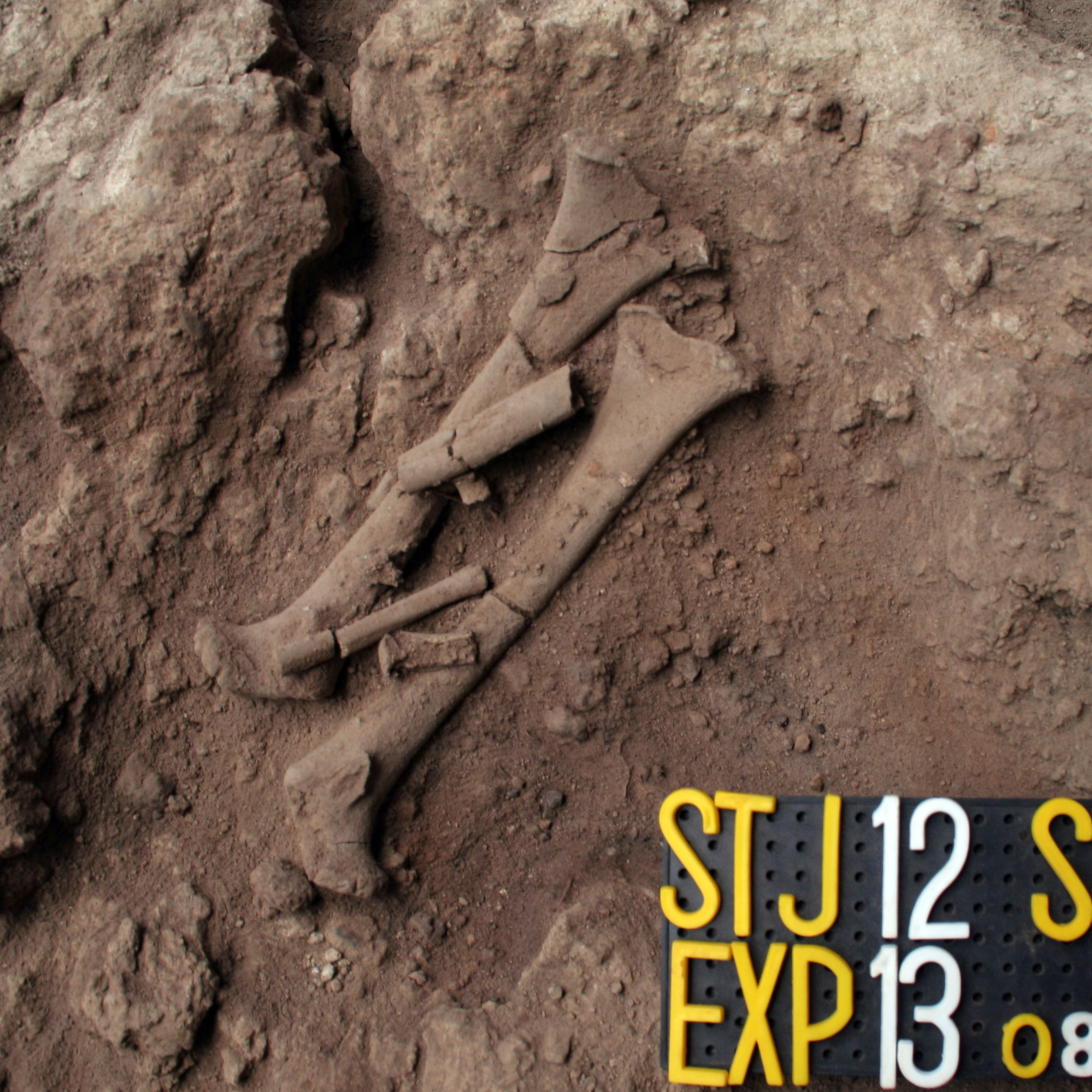
Burial 19. Excavation at phase 13.

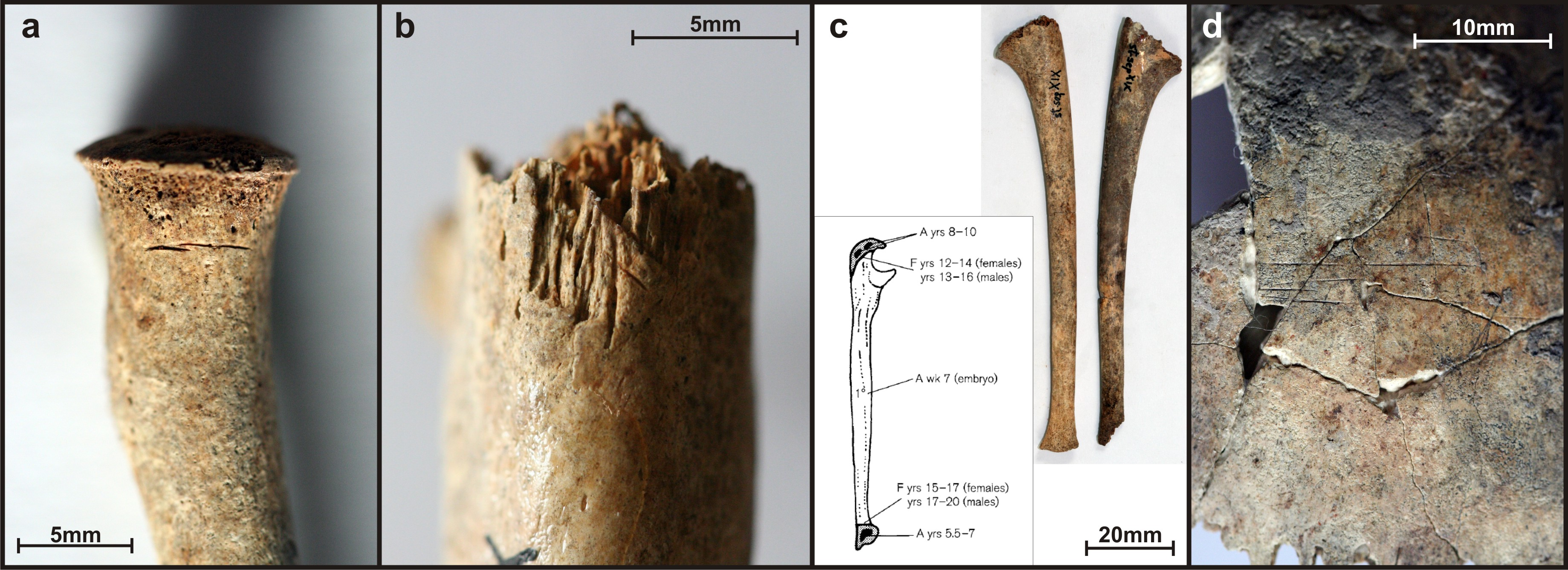
Burial 19. Cut marks and possible green bone fractures.
Lapa do Santo - Burial 22

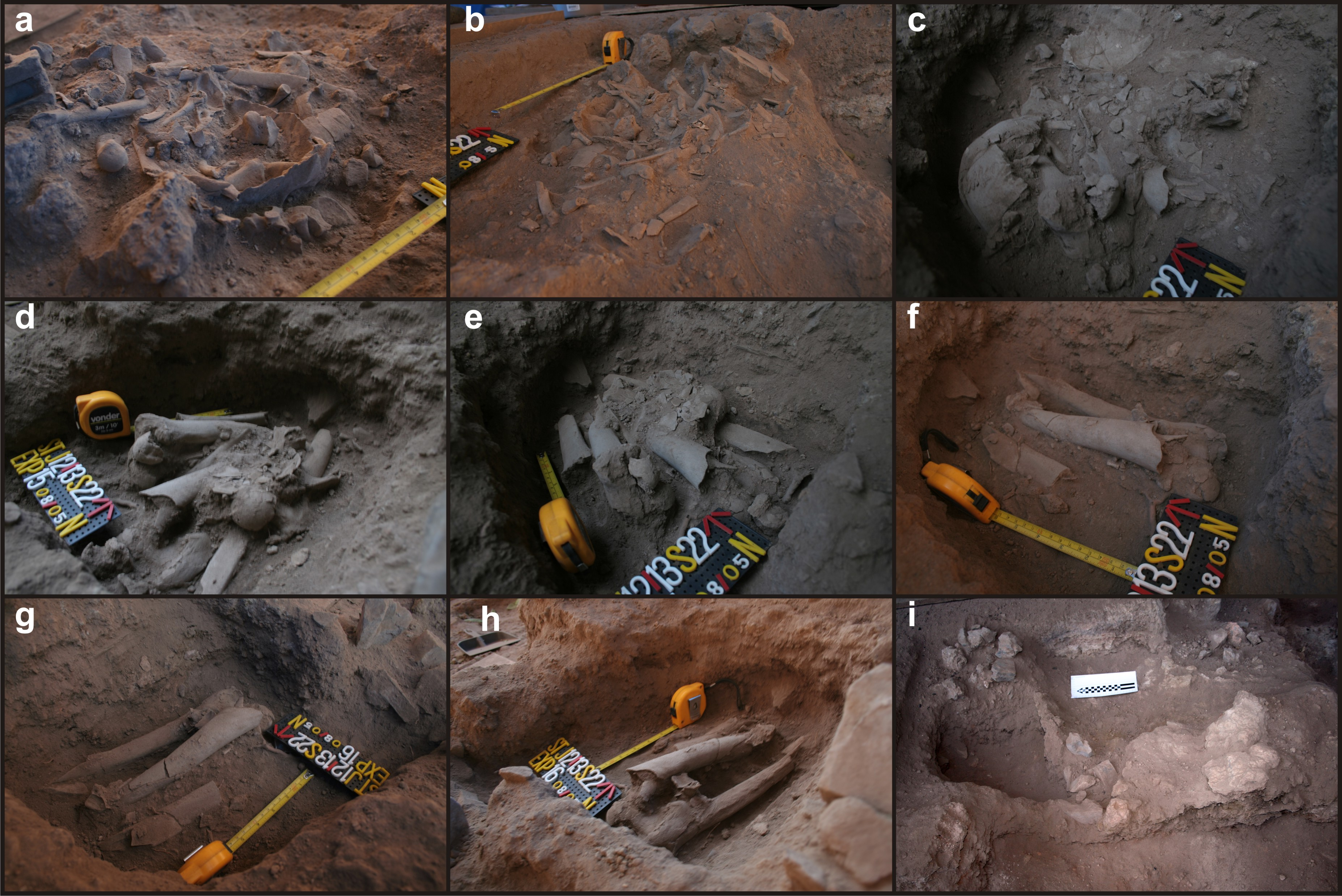
Burial 22. Multiple views of the excavation process.

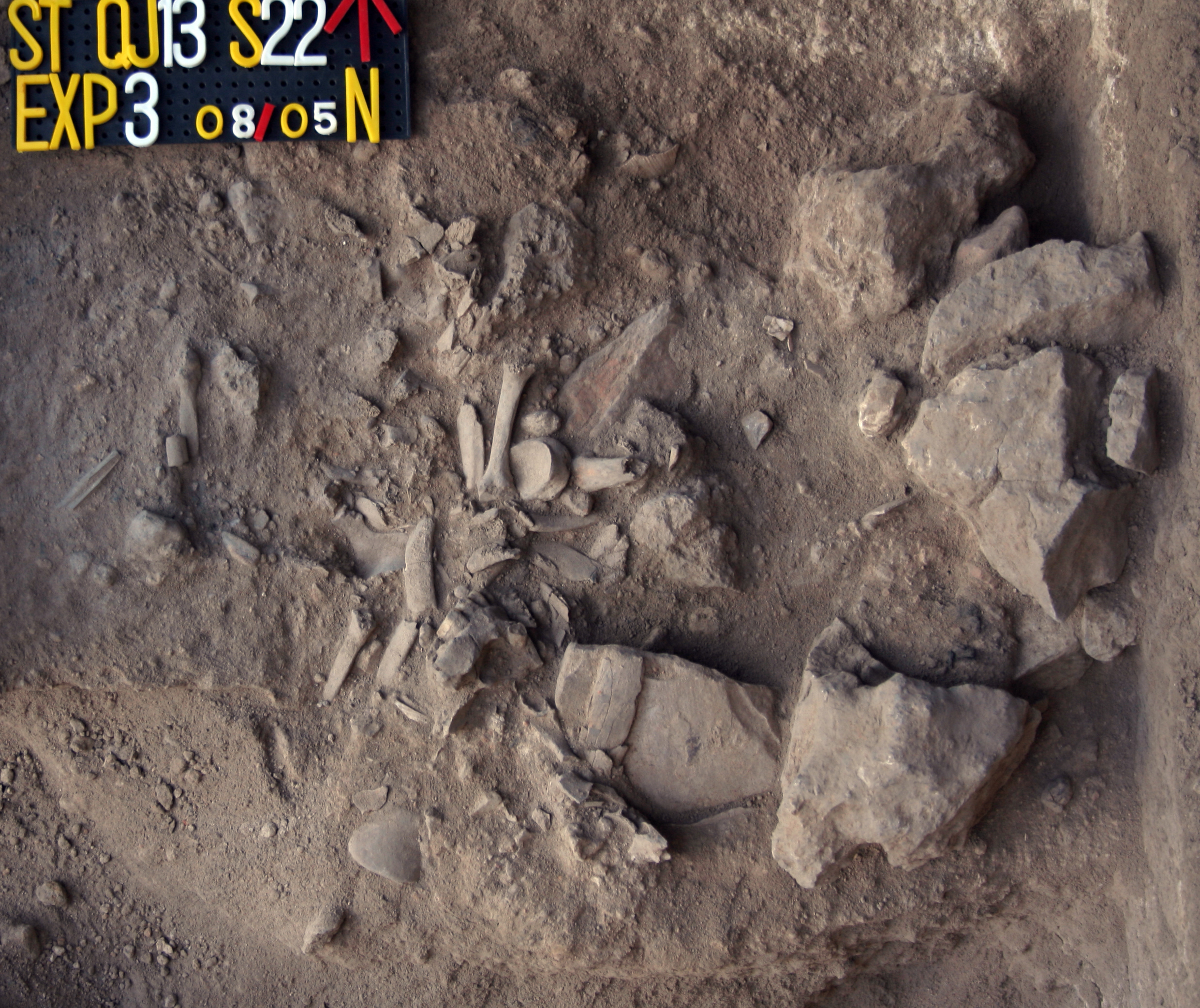
Burial 22. Excavation at exposition 3.

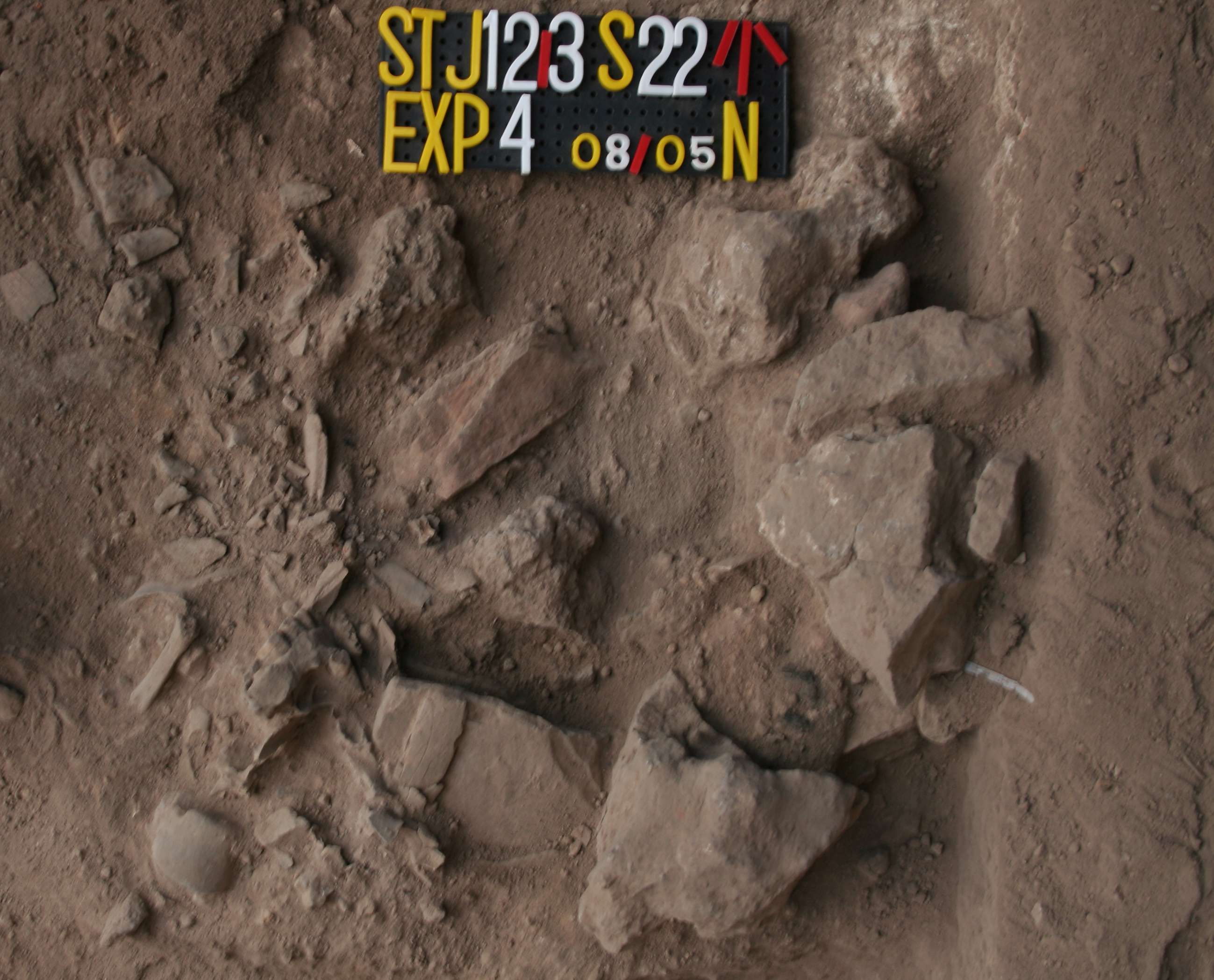
Burial 22. Excavation at exposition 4.

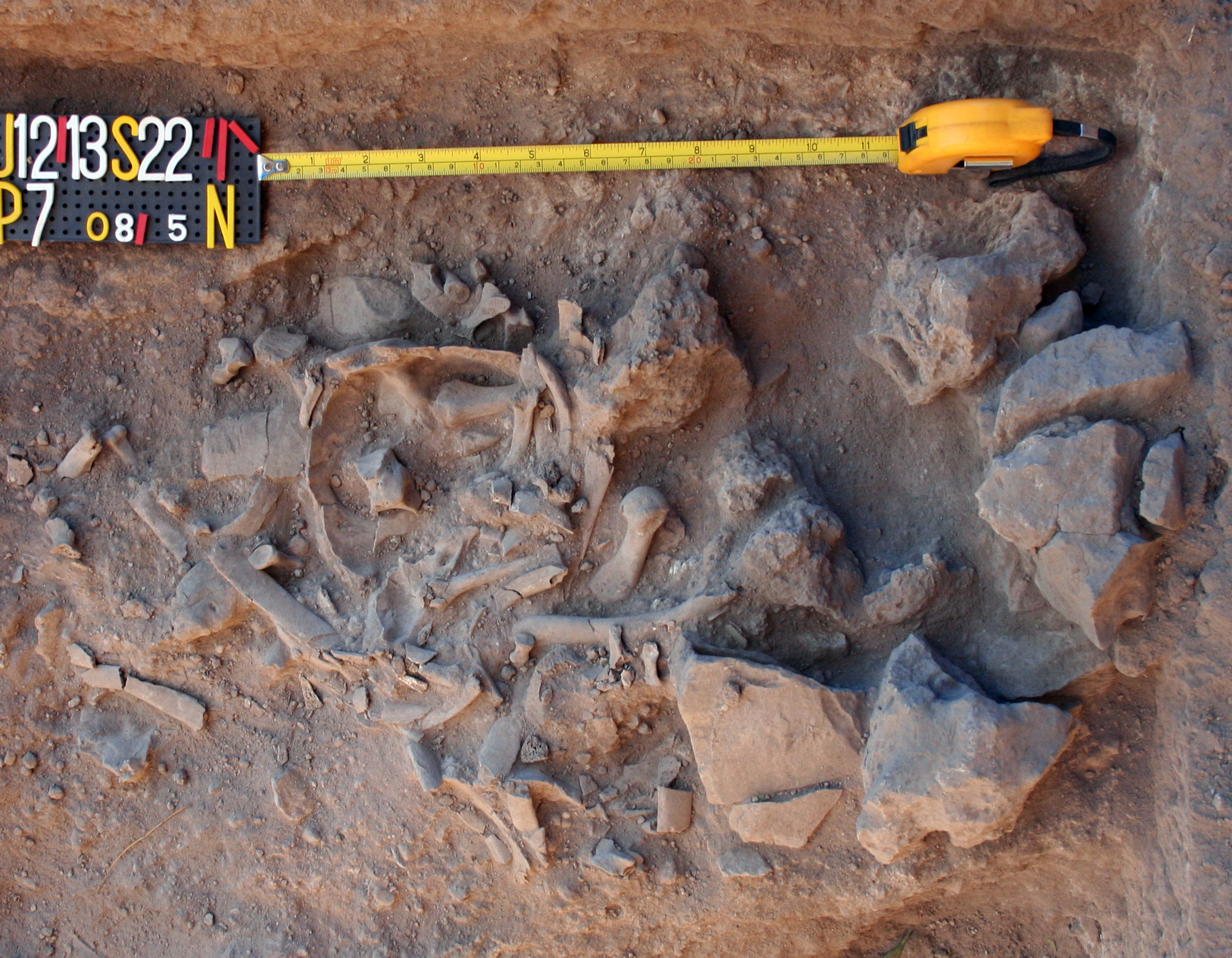
Burial 22. Excavation at exposition 7.

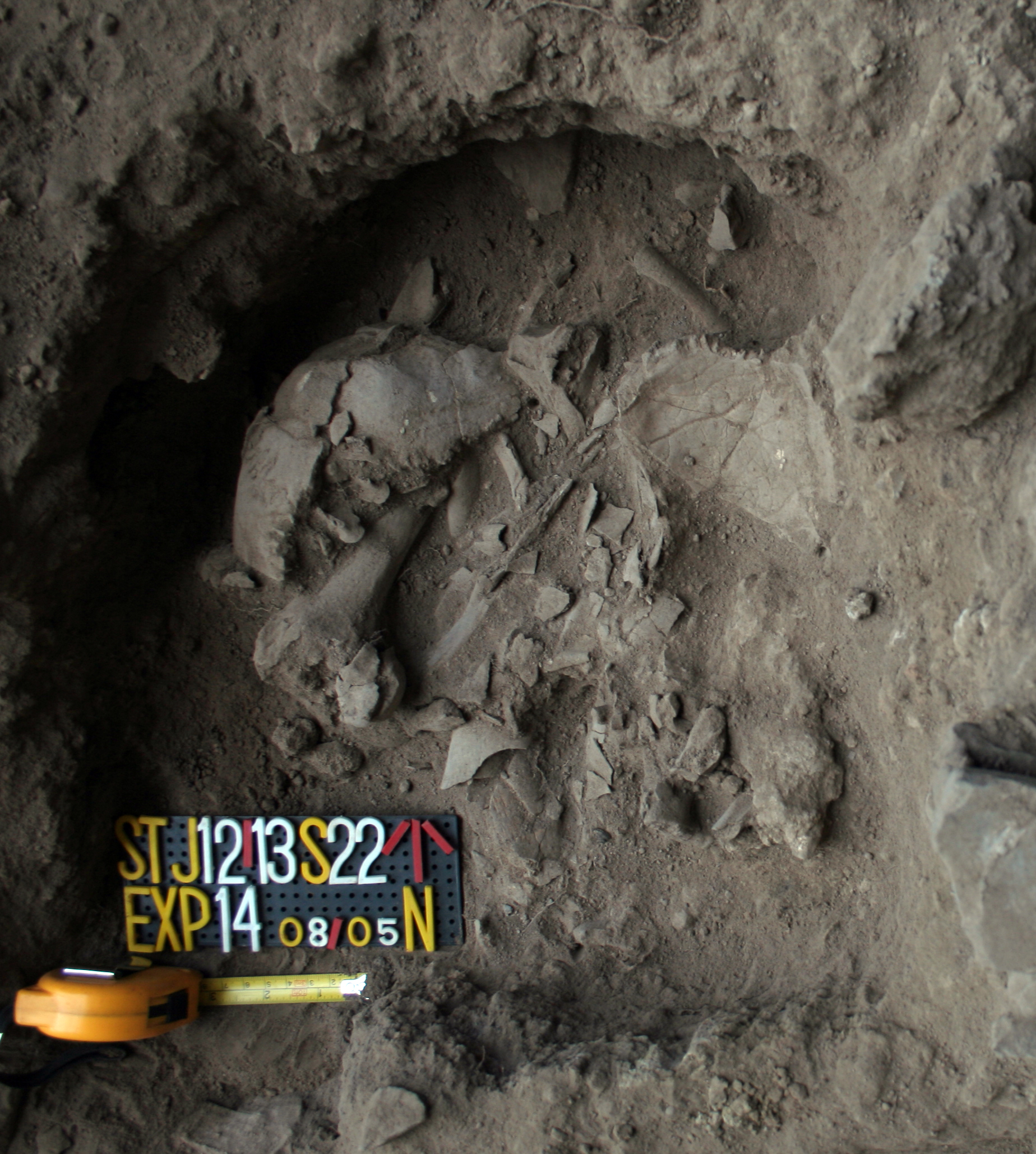
Burial 22. Excavation at exposition 14.

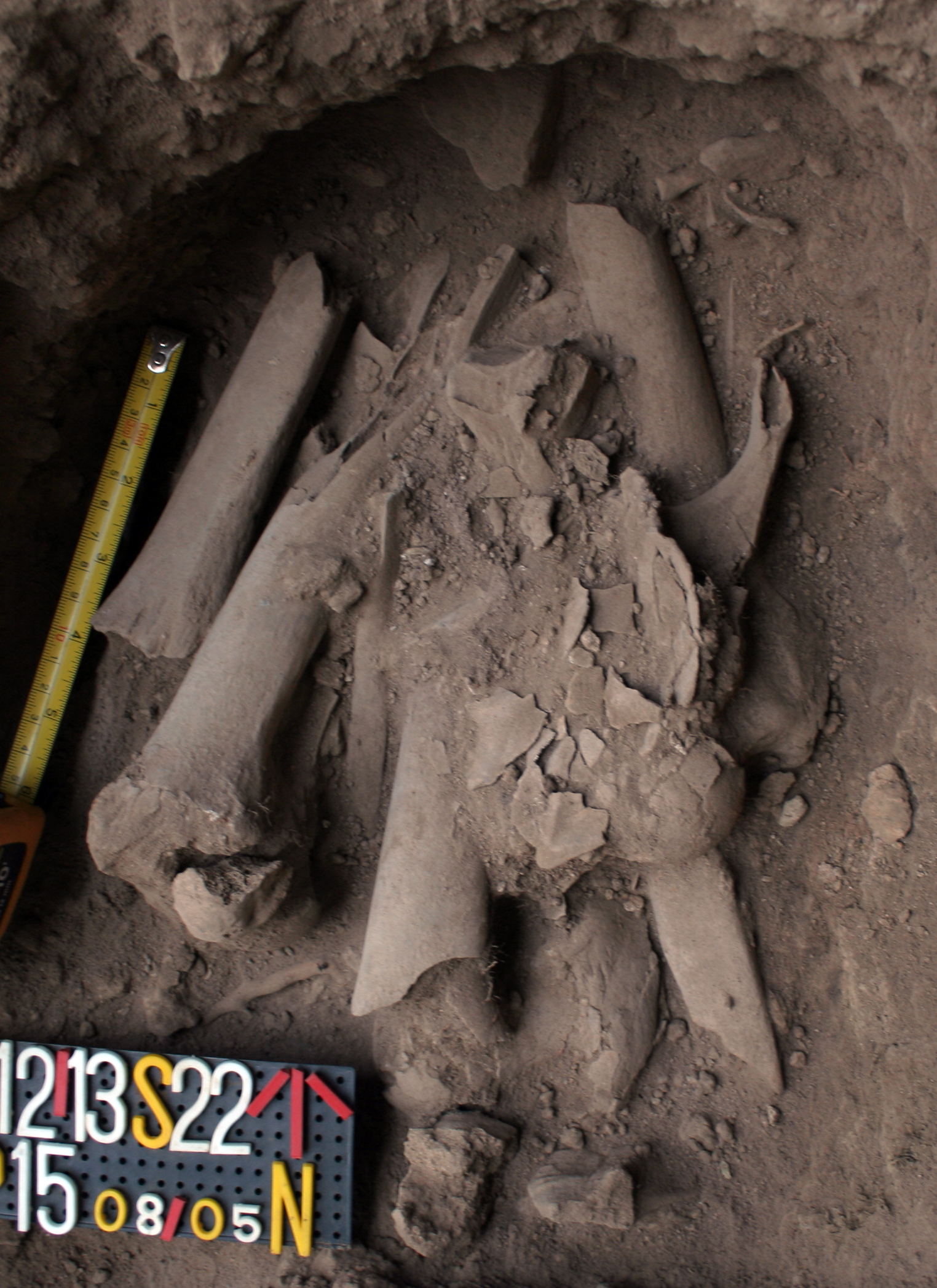
Burial 22. Excavation at exposition 15.

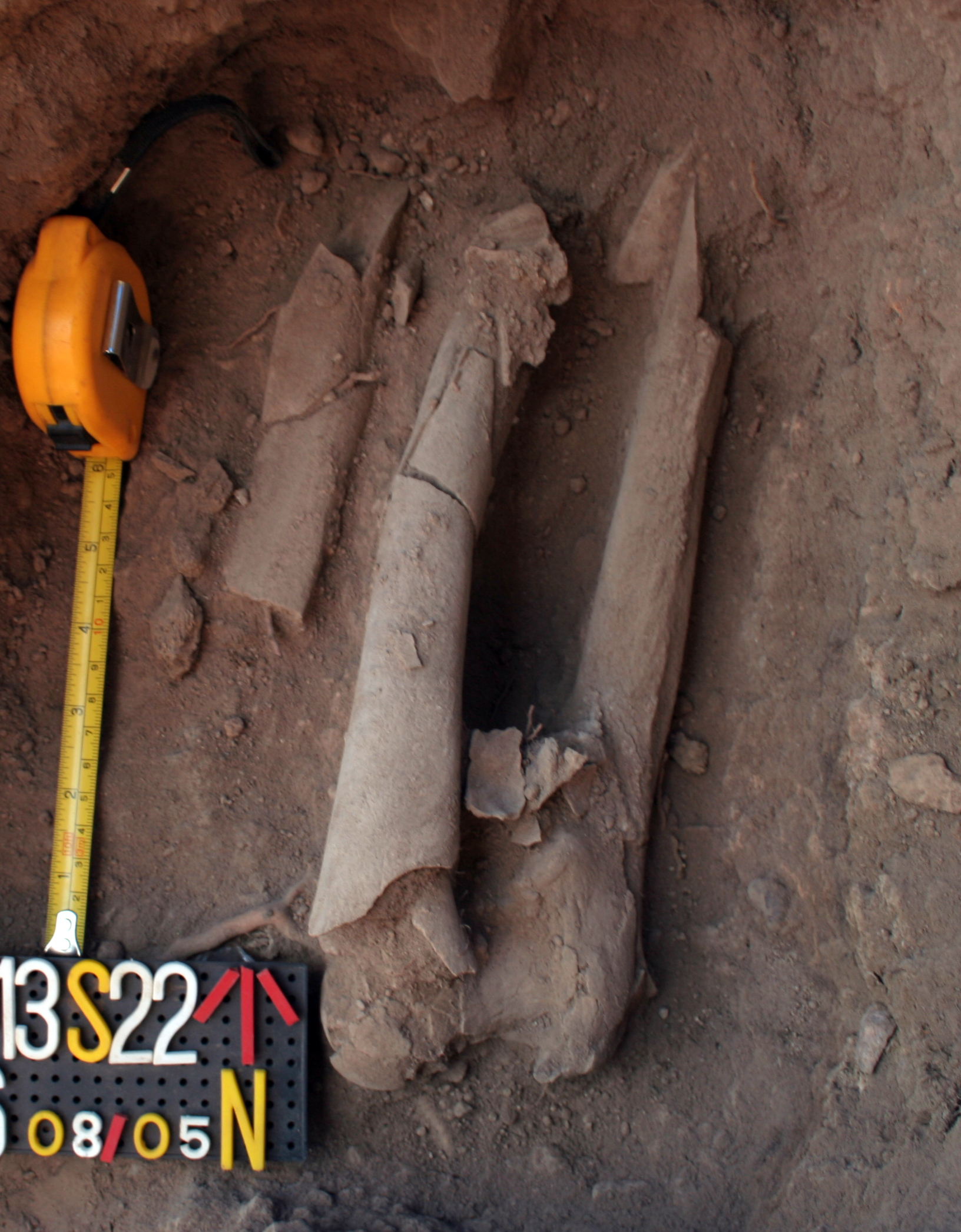
Burial 22. Excavation at exposition 16.

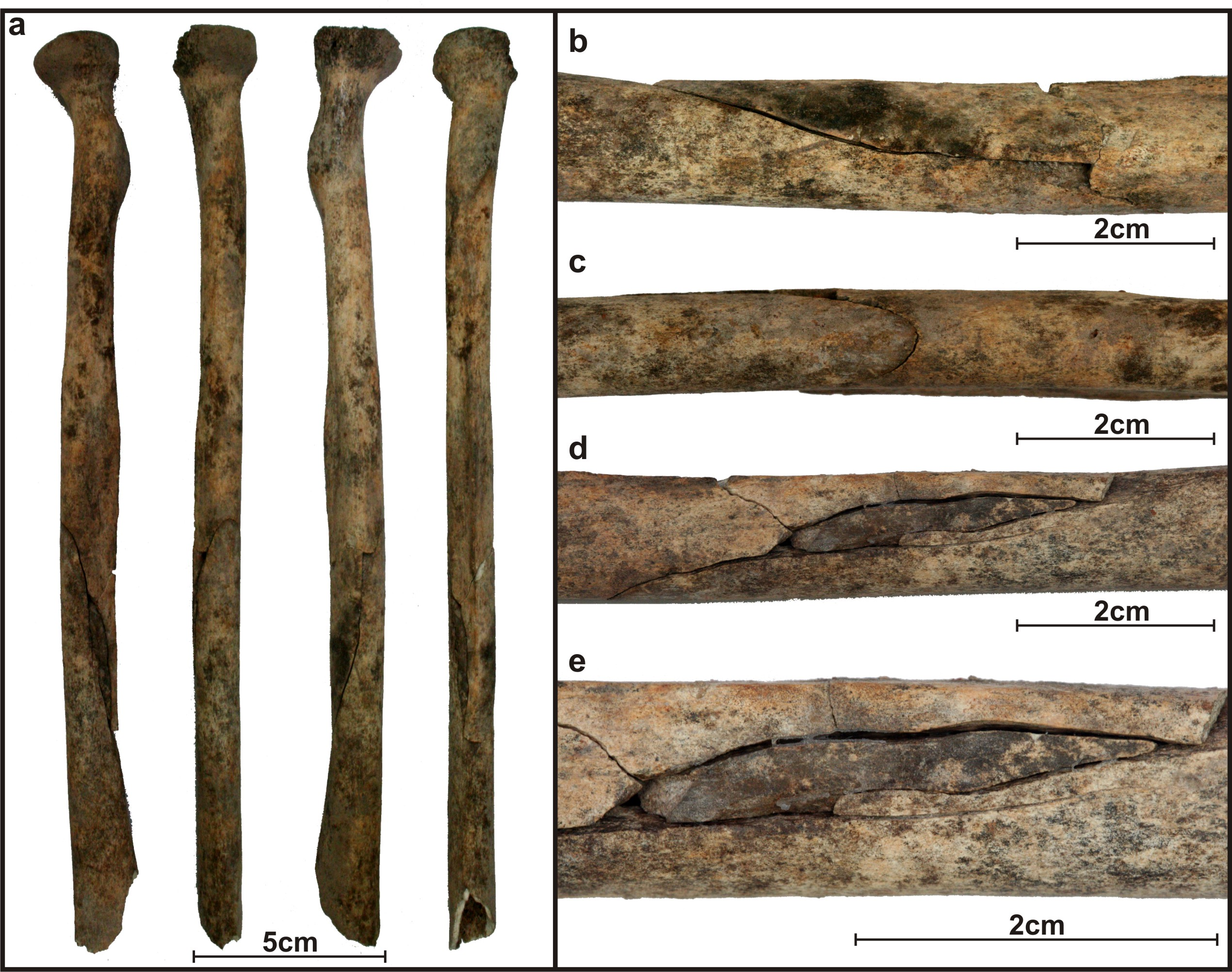
Burial 22. Perimortem butterfly fracture on the right radius

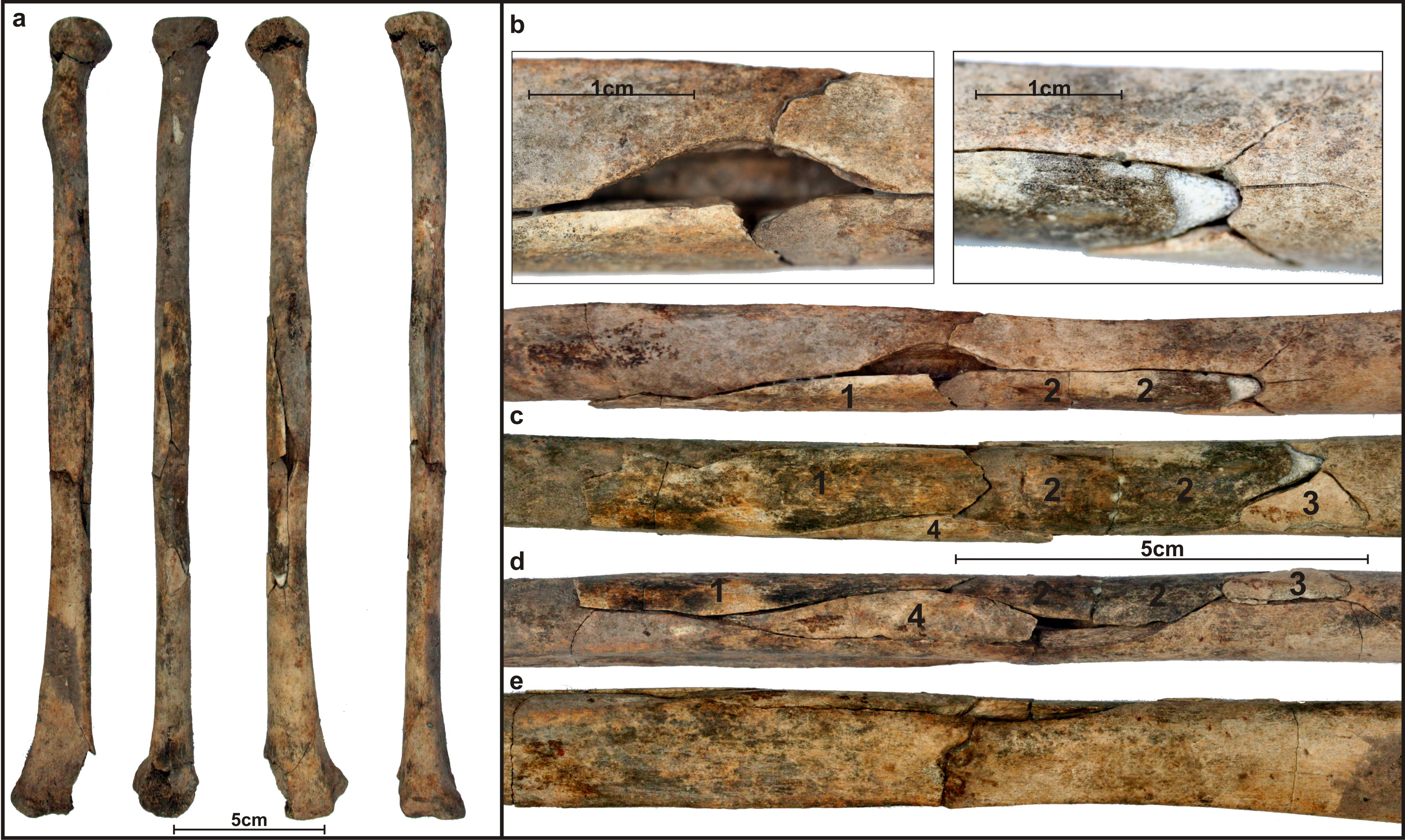
Burial 22. Perimortem butterfly fracture on the left radius

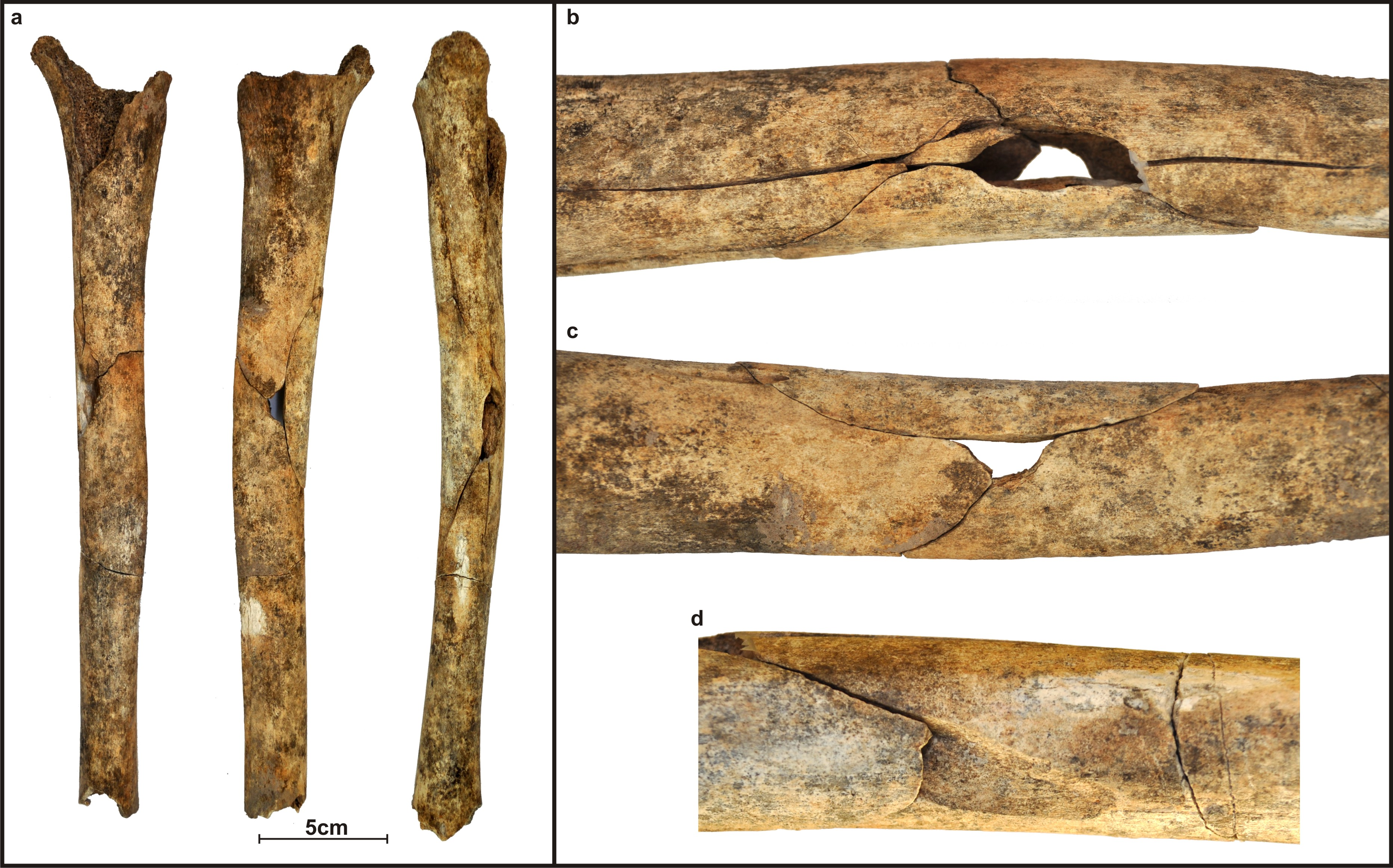
Burial 22. Perimortem butterfly fracture on the tibia

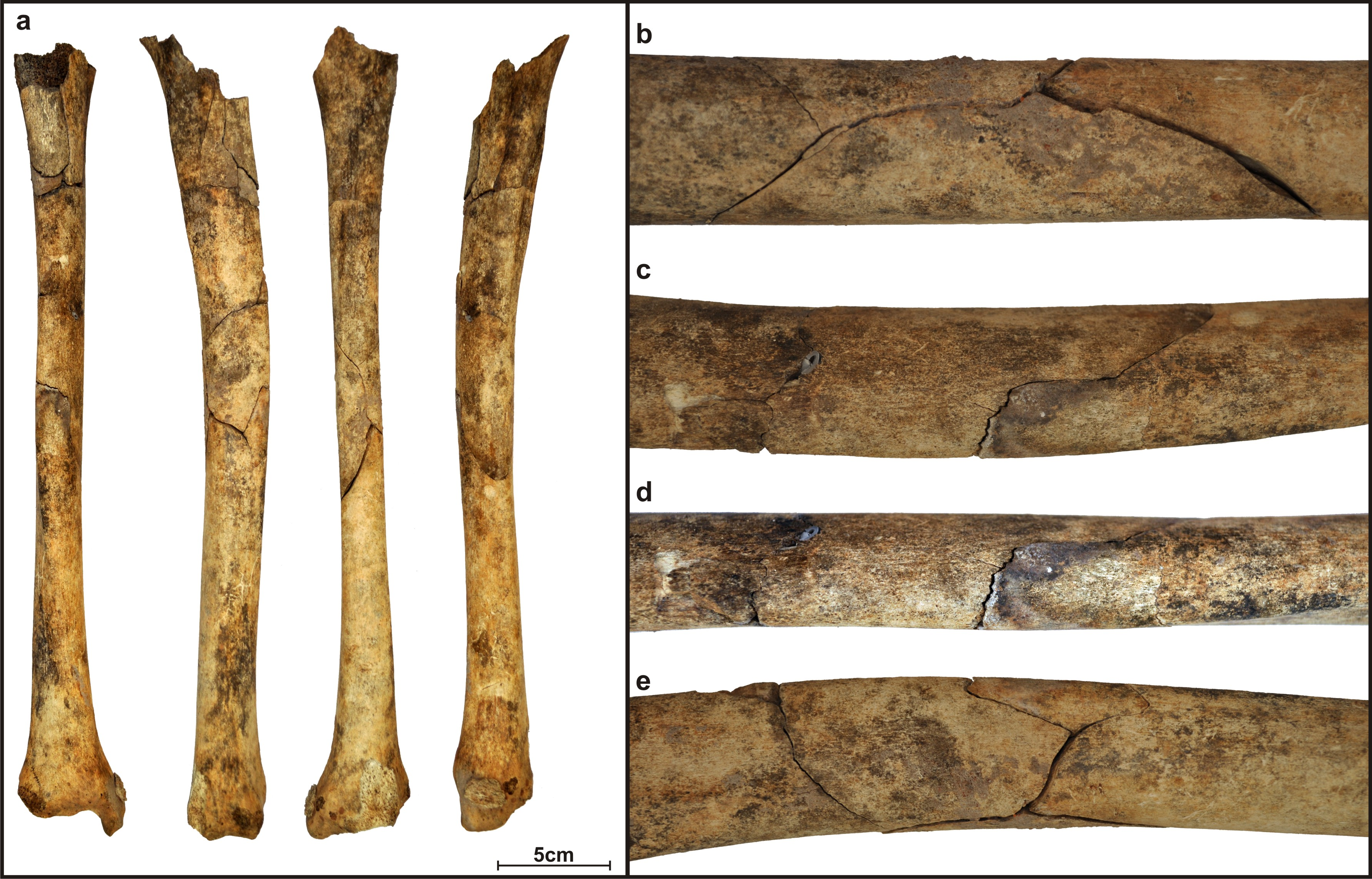
Burial 22. Perimortem butterfly fracture on the tibia.

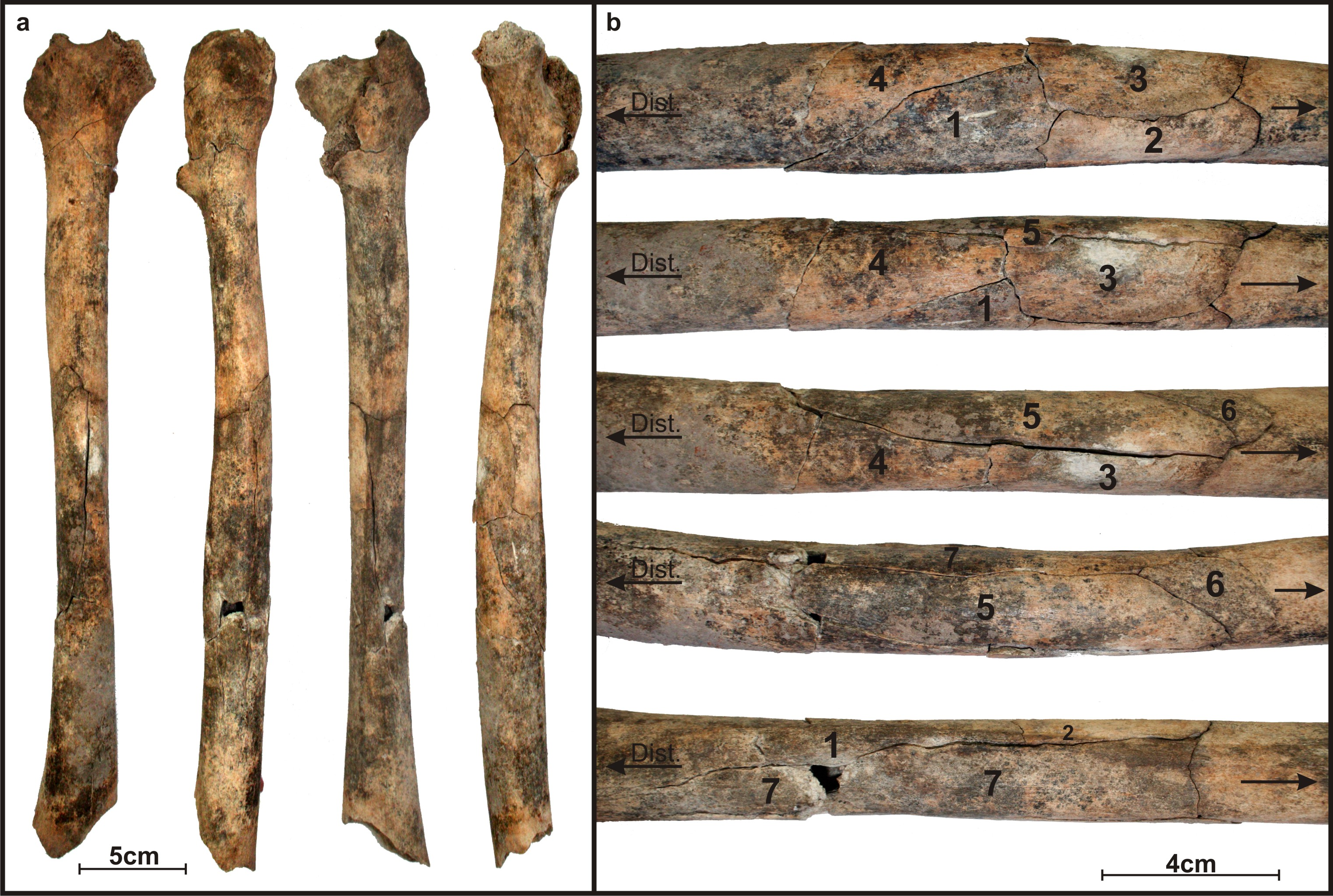
Burial 22. Perimortem fracture on the femur

=== Lapa do Santo Mortuary Pattern 4 ===
Lapa do Santo Mortuary Pattern 4 (LSMP-4) is defined based on Burial 2 and Burial 3 that were composed of the partial articulated skeleton of a single adult individual with limb bones missing. In Burial 2 (male) the bones of the upper limb were missing and in Burial 3 (female) both the bones of the upper and lower limb were missing. It is not clear if these absences are taphonomic or result from the intentional acts of the funerary agents.

Lapa do Santo - Burial 2

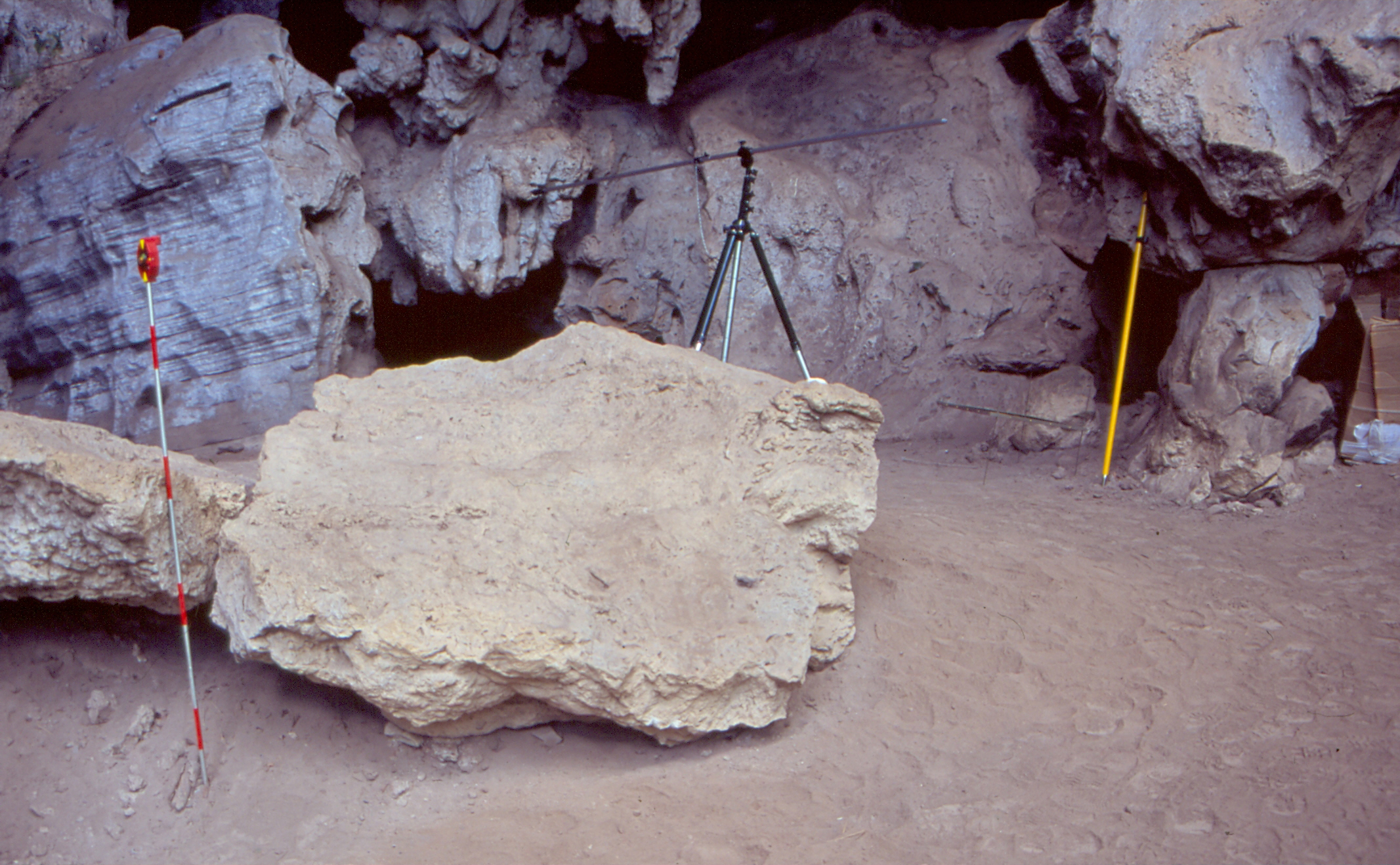
Burial 2 was immediately below this speleothem. Could explain the absence of the upper limb.

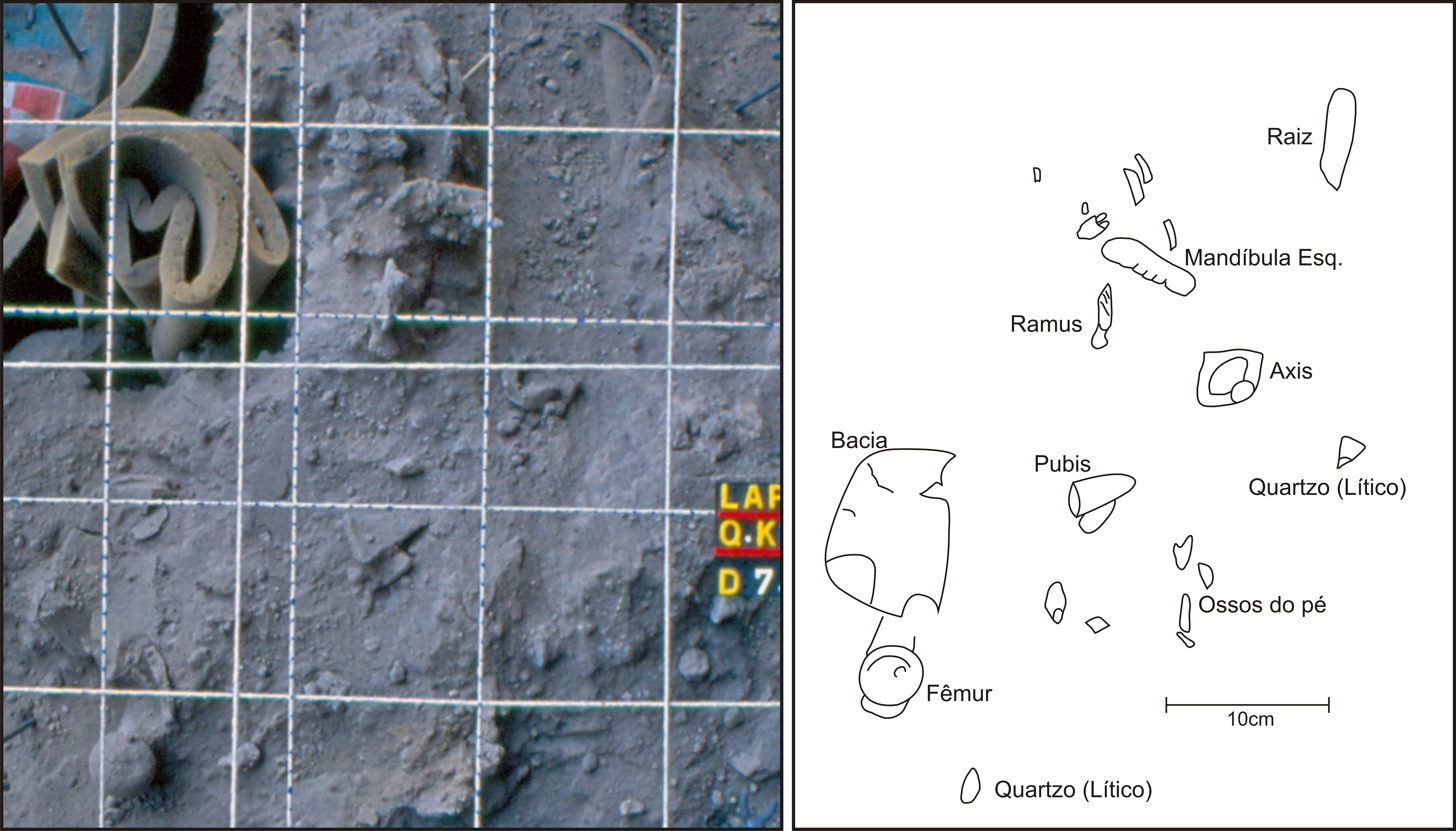
Burial 2 - Excavation at phase 4.

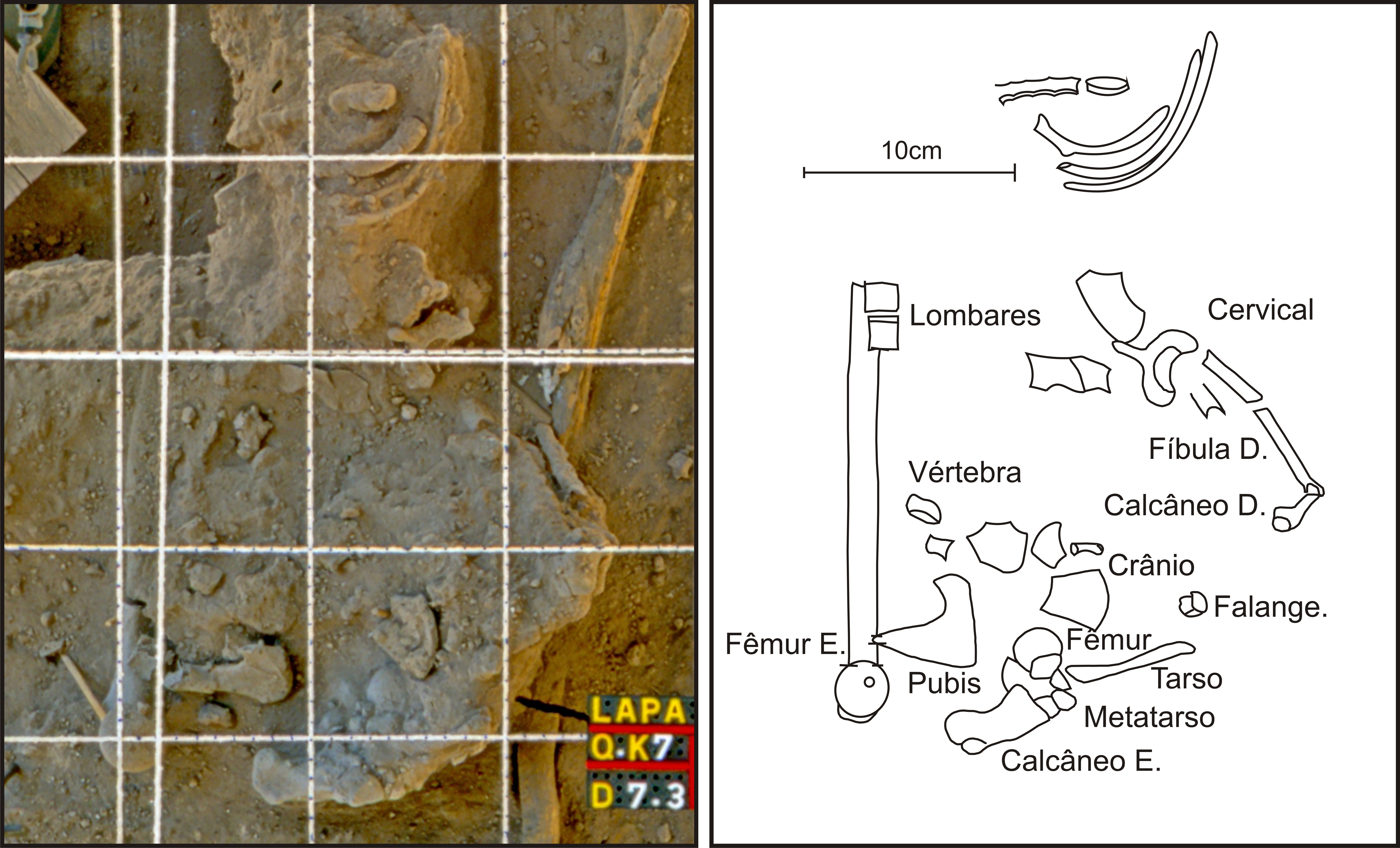
Burial 2 - Excavation at phase 6.

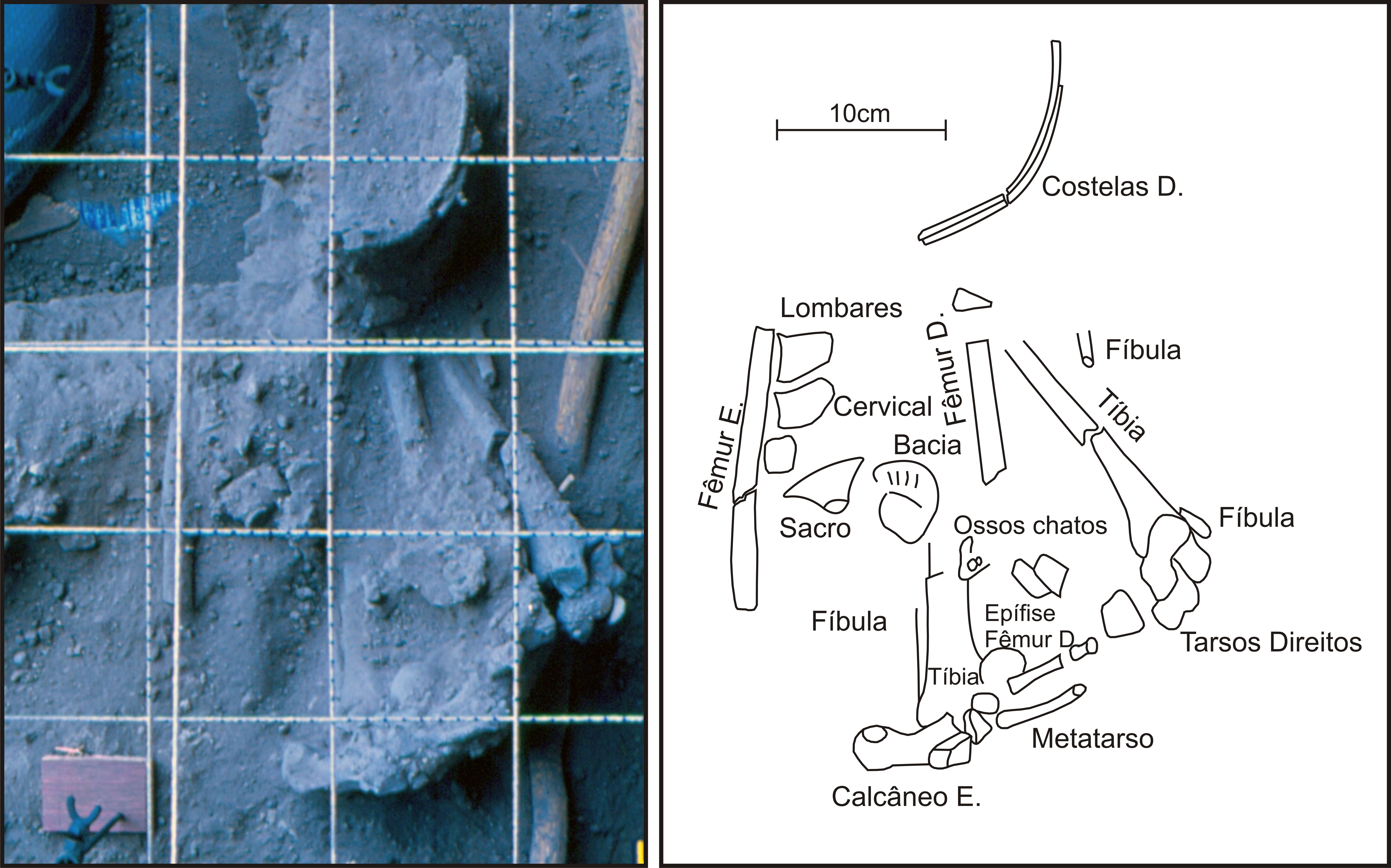
Burial 2 - Excavation at phase 7.

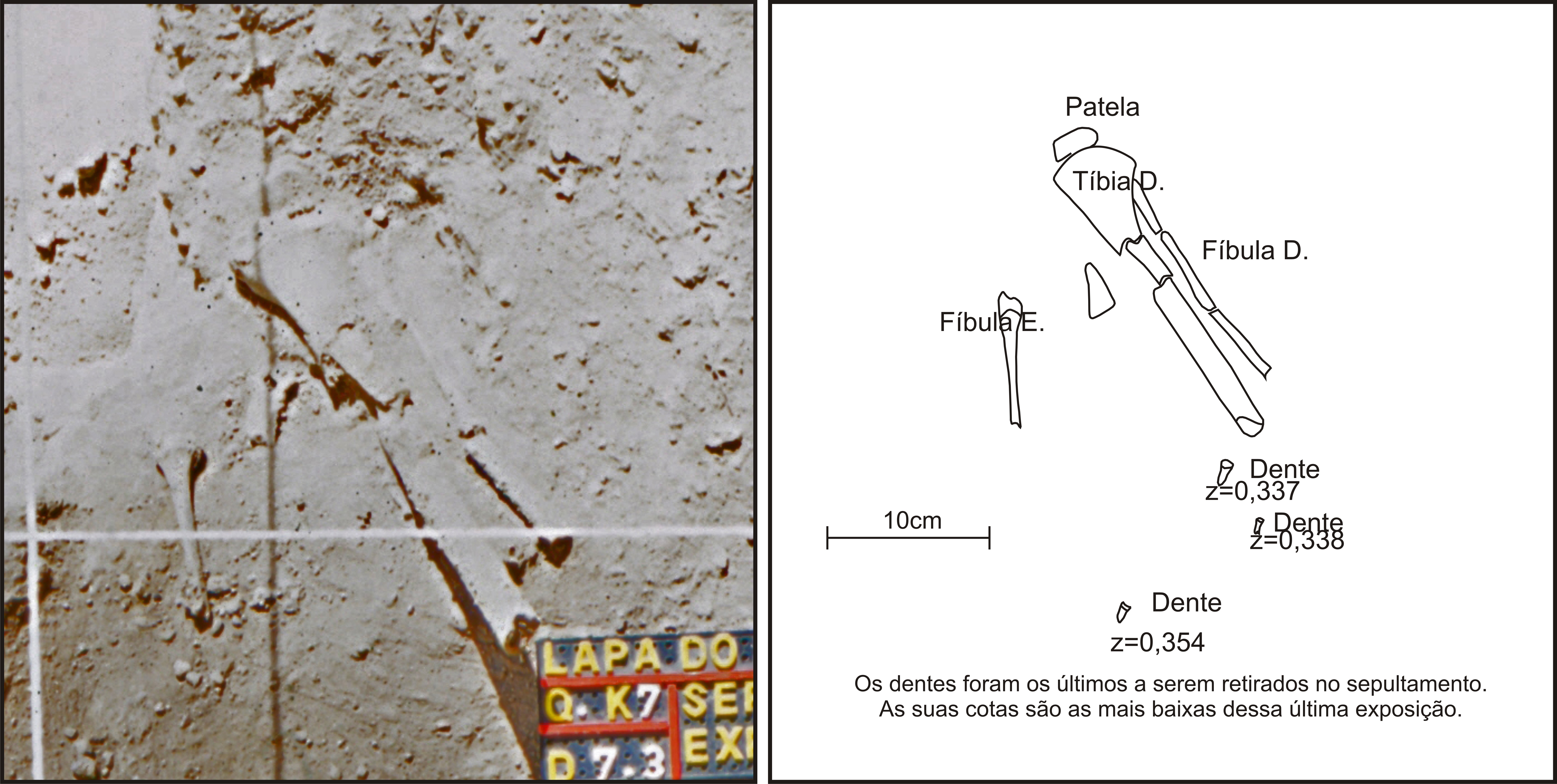
Burial 2 - Excavation at phase 9.

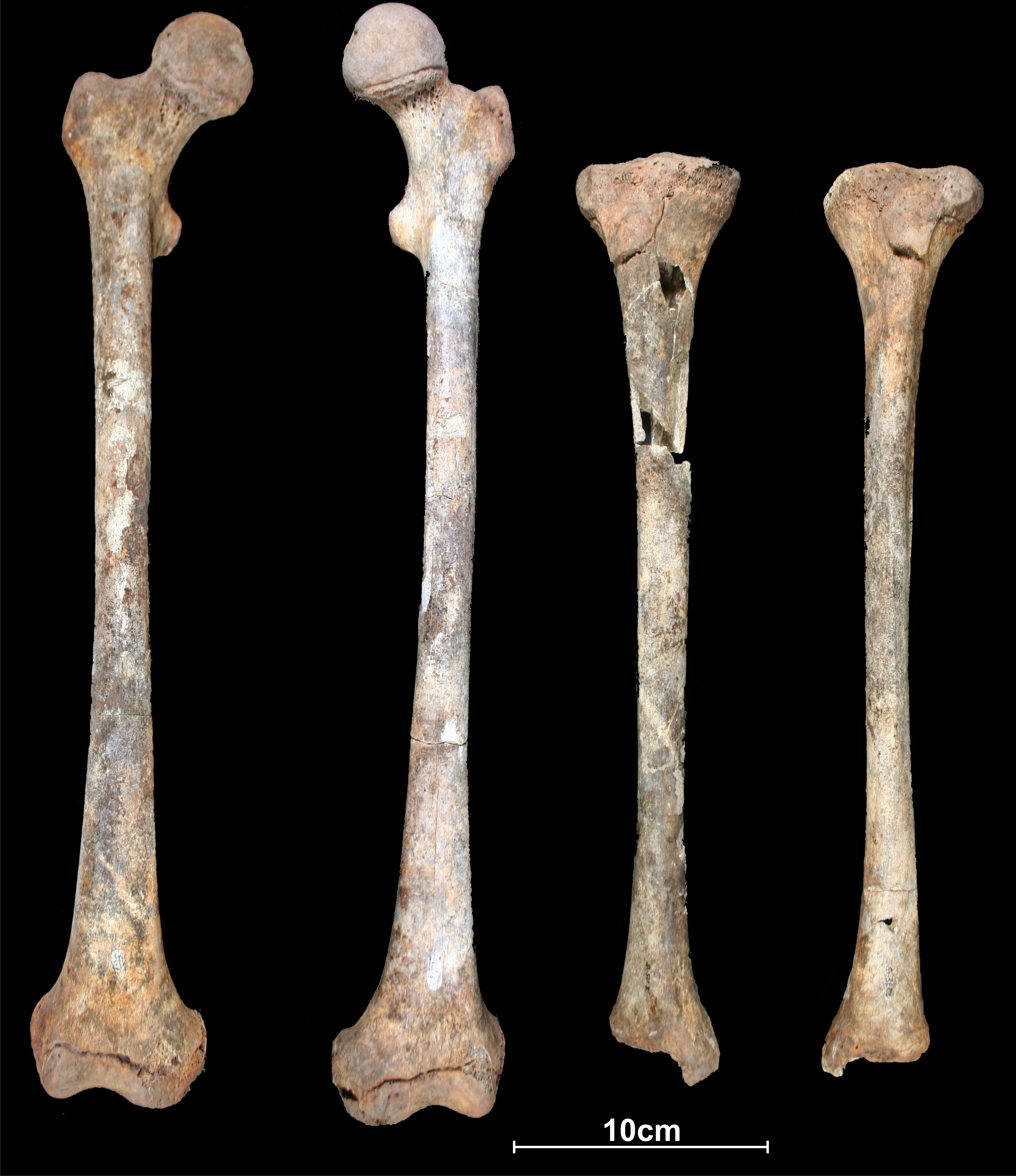
Burial 2 - Lowe limbs were not affected by the speleothem.

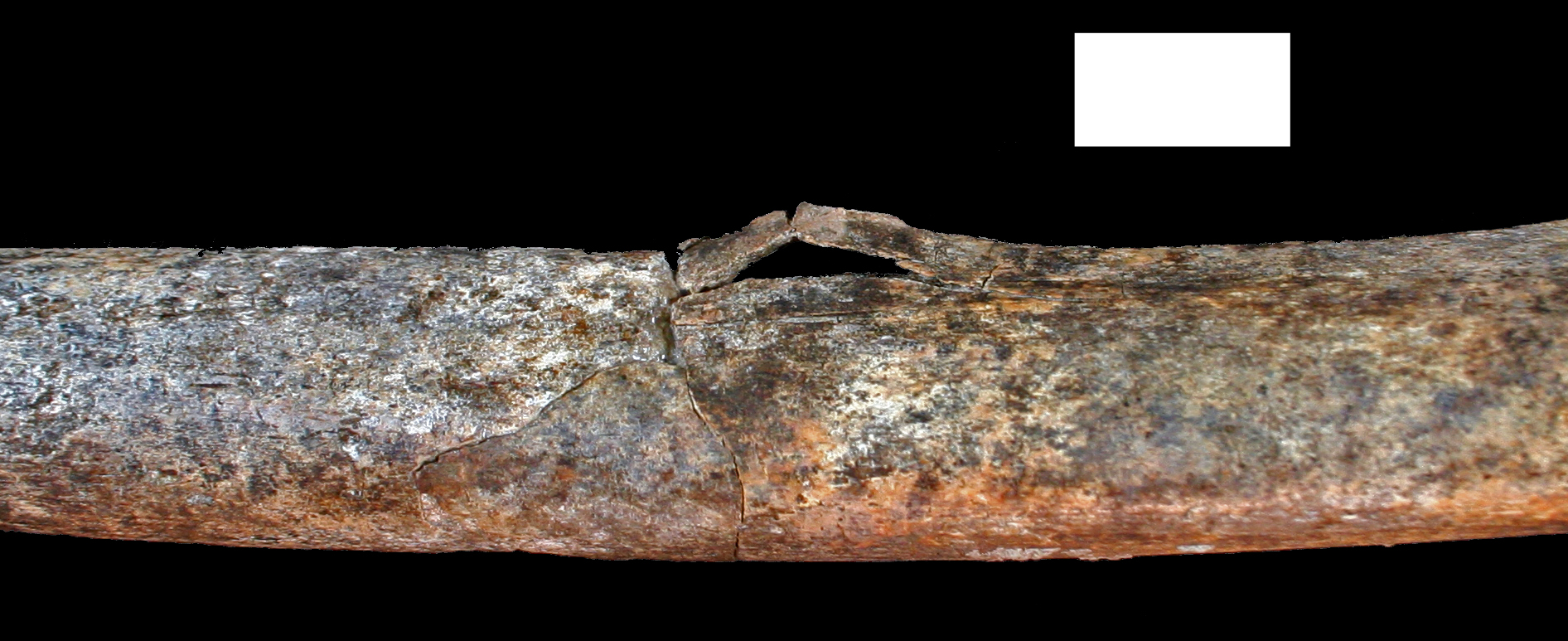
Burial 2 - Detachment of bone in the femur (intentional?)
Lapa do Santo - Burial 3

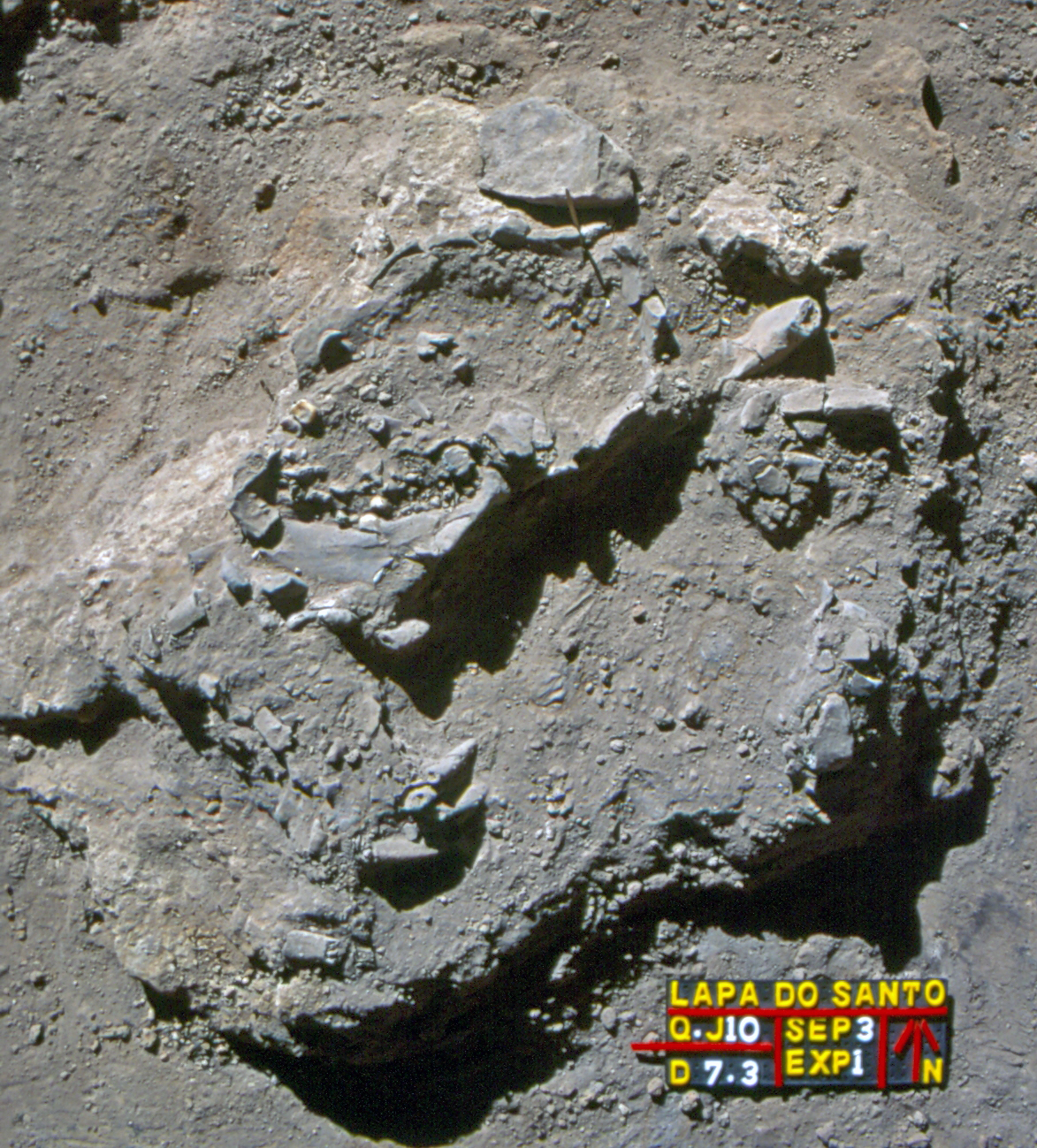
Burial 3 - Excavation at phase 1.

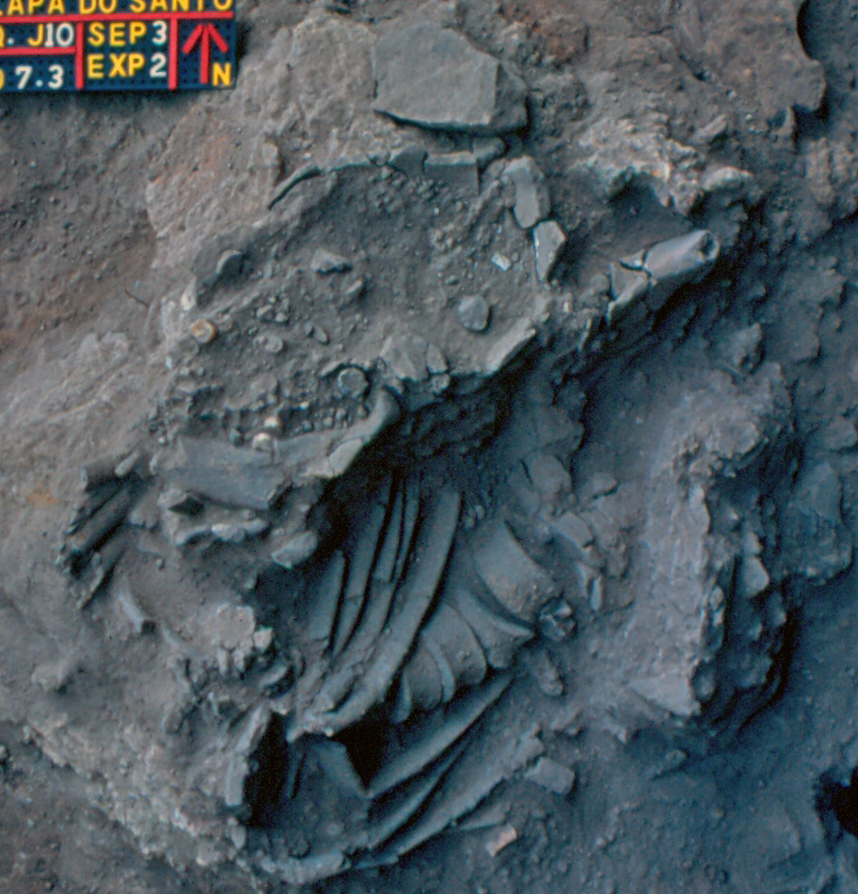
Burial 3 - Excavation at phase 2.

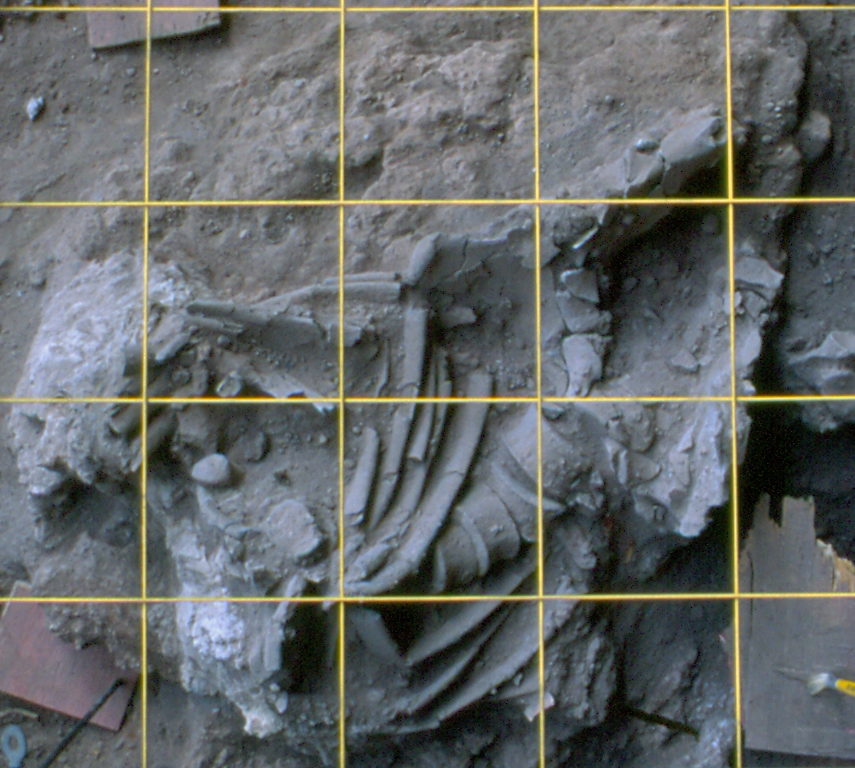
Burial 3 - Excavation at phase 3.

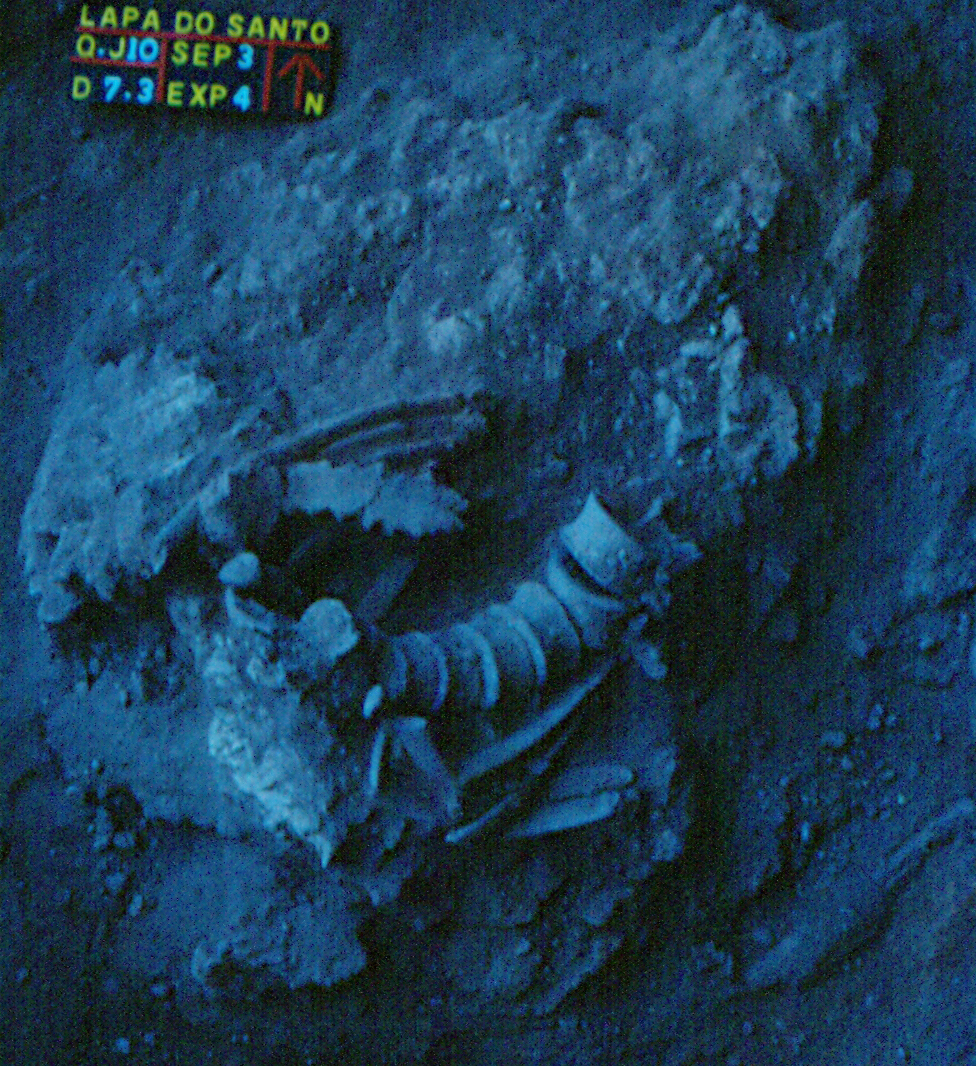
Burial 3 - Excavation at phase 4.

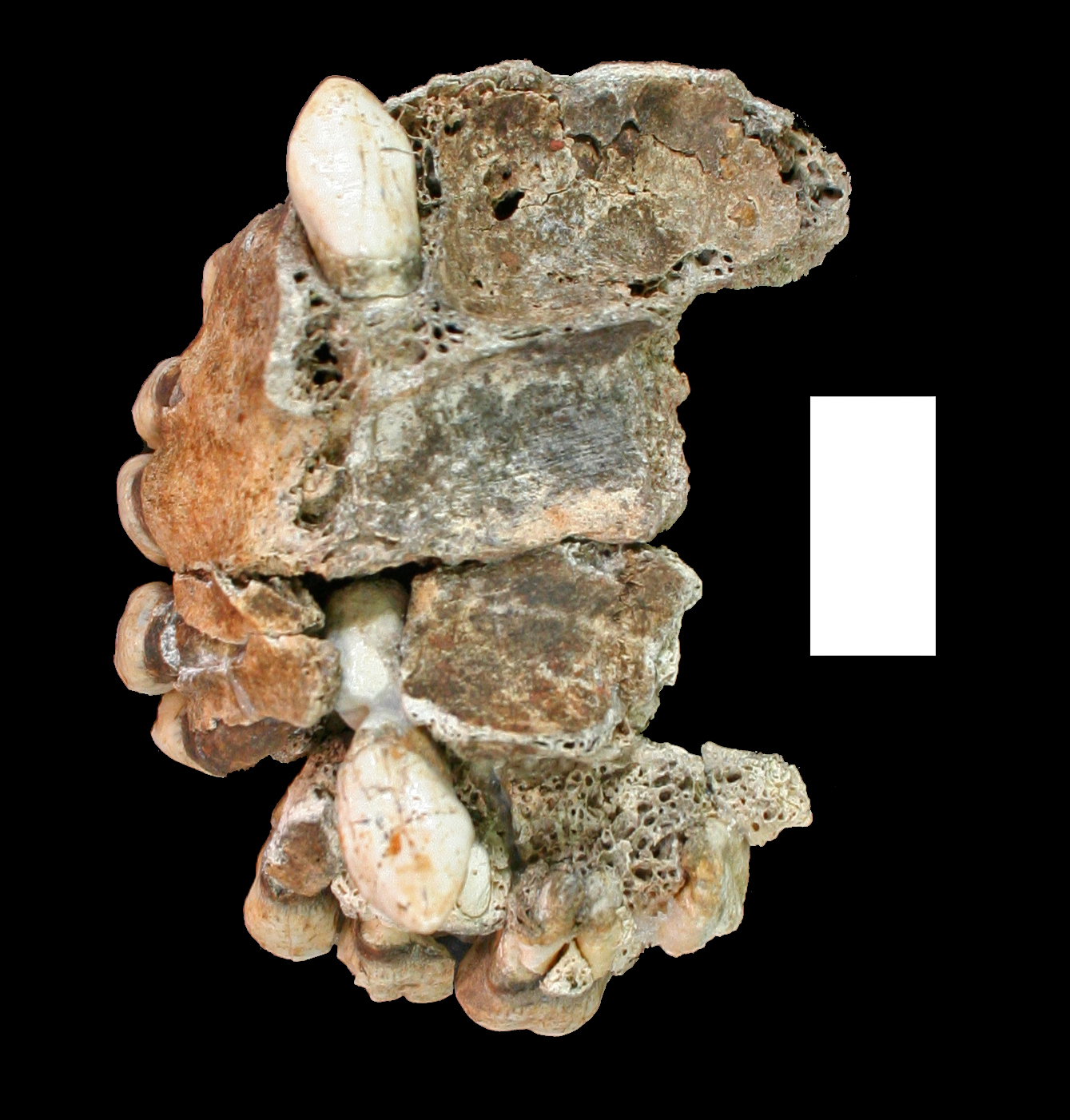
Burial 3 - Abnormal growth of the canines.

=== Lapa do Santo Mortuary Pattern 5 ===
Lapa do Santo Mortuary Pattern 5 (LSMP-5) includes only Burial 5. Burial 5 was a completely disarticulated complete skeleton of a single adult male individual. The bones were part of a bundle and several defleshing marks were observed.

Lapa do Santo - Burial 5

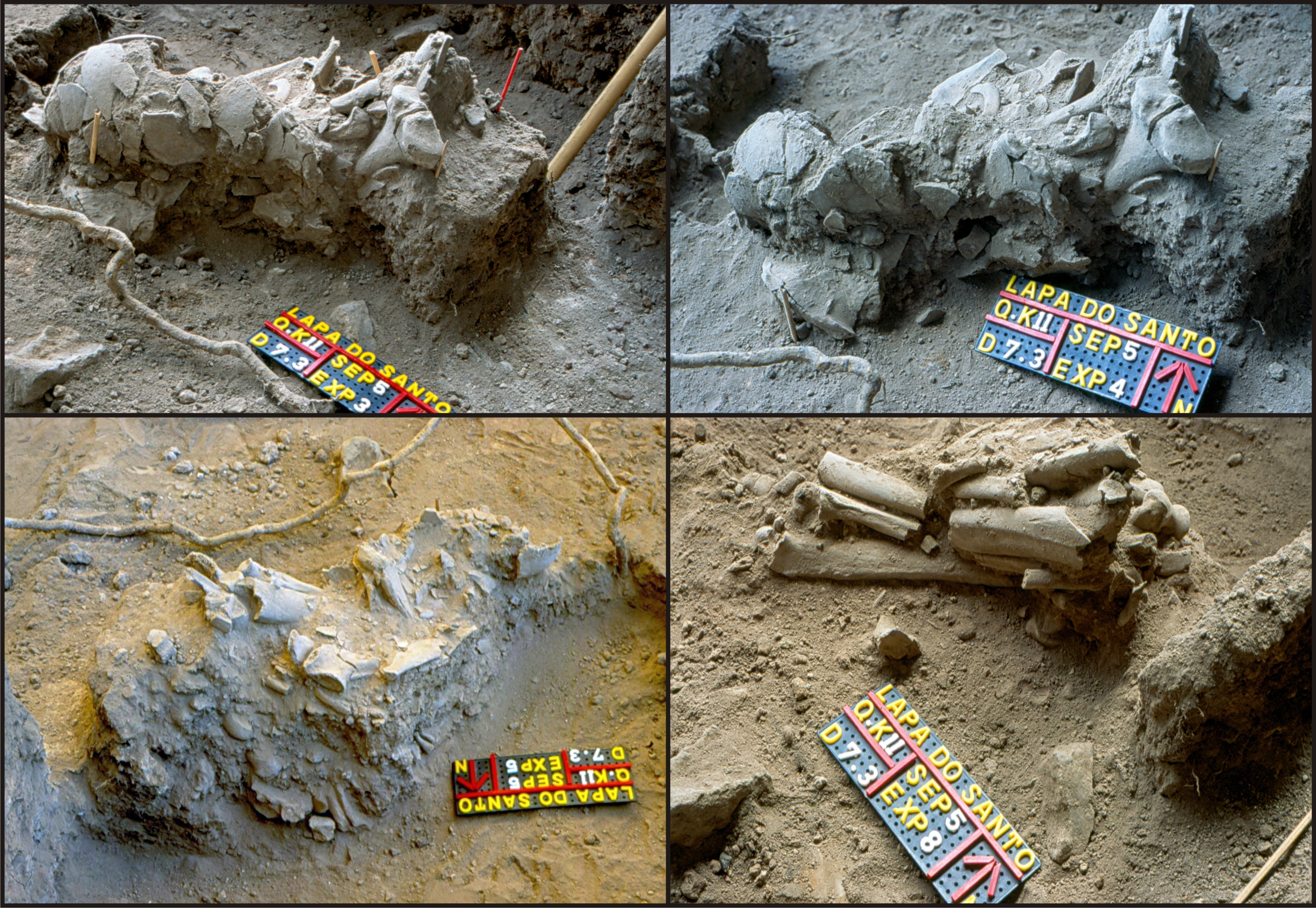
Burial 5 - Multiple views of the excavation process.

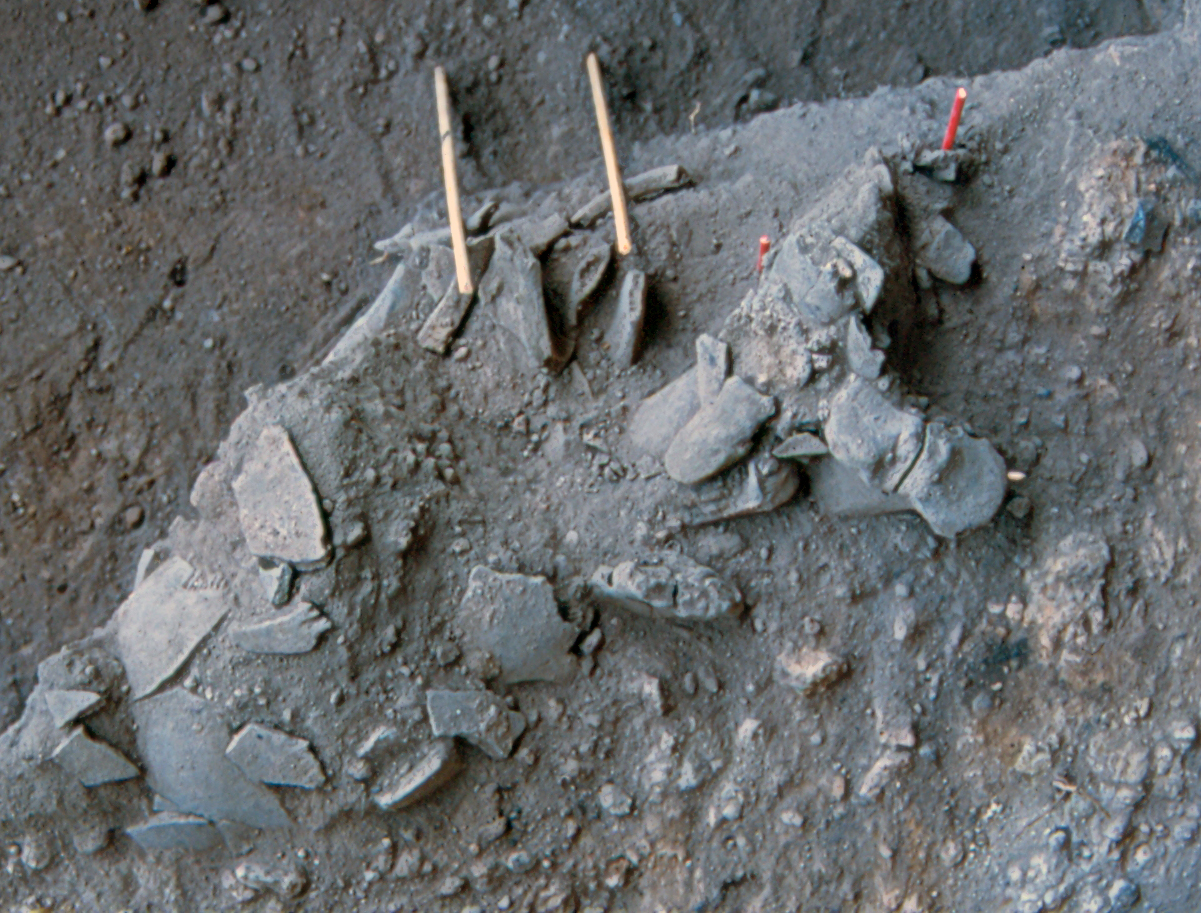
Burial 5. Excavation at phase 2.

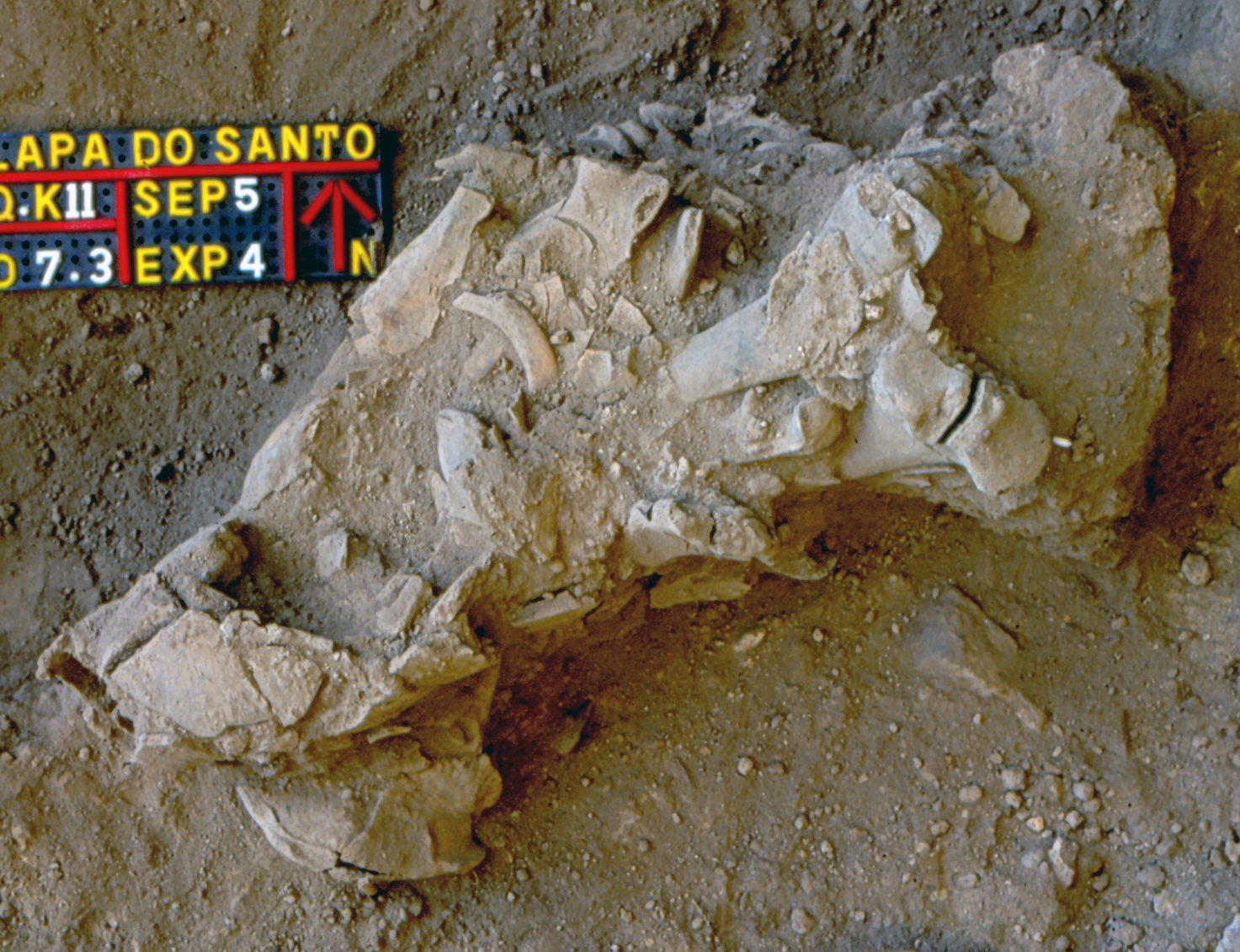
Burial 5. Excavation at phase 4.

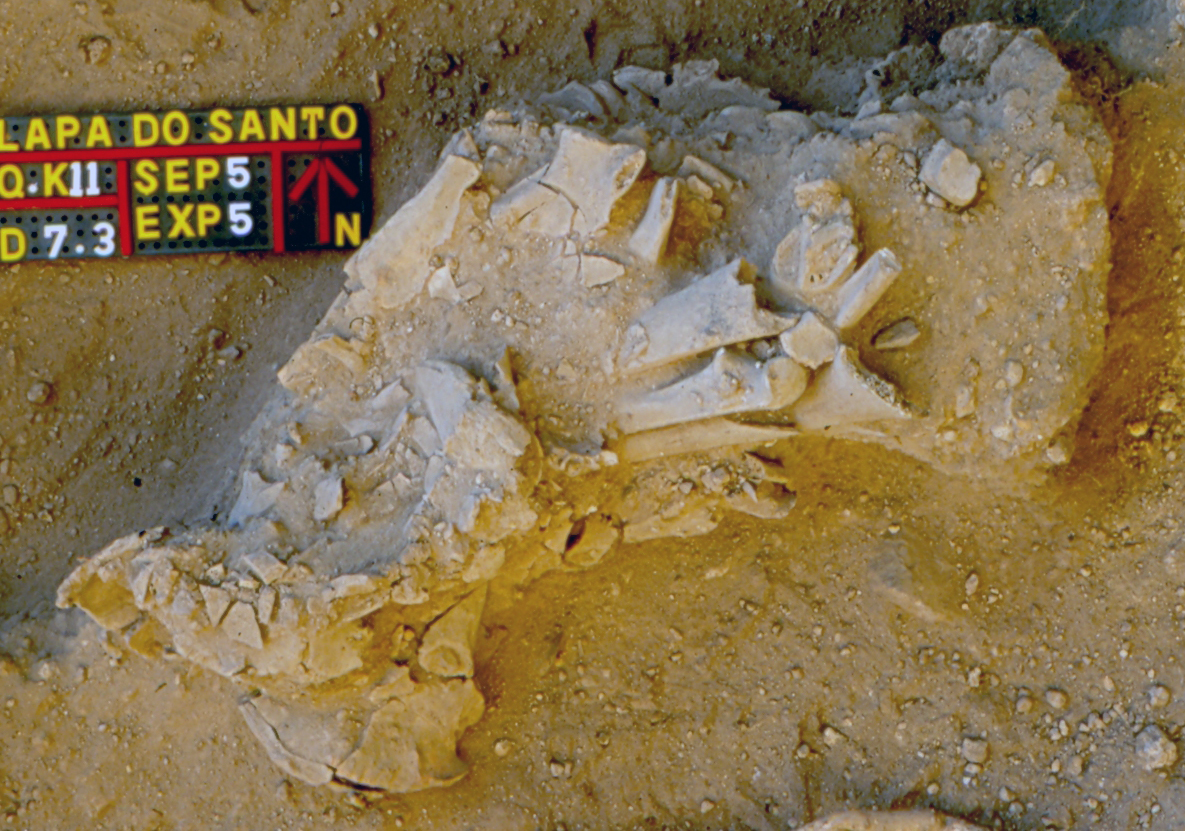
Burial 5. Excavation at phase 5.

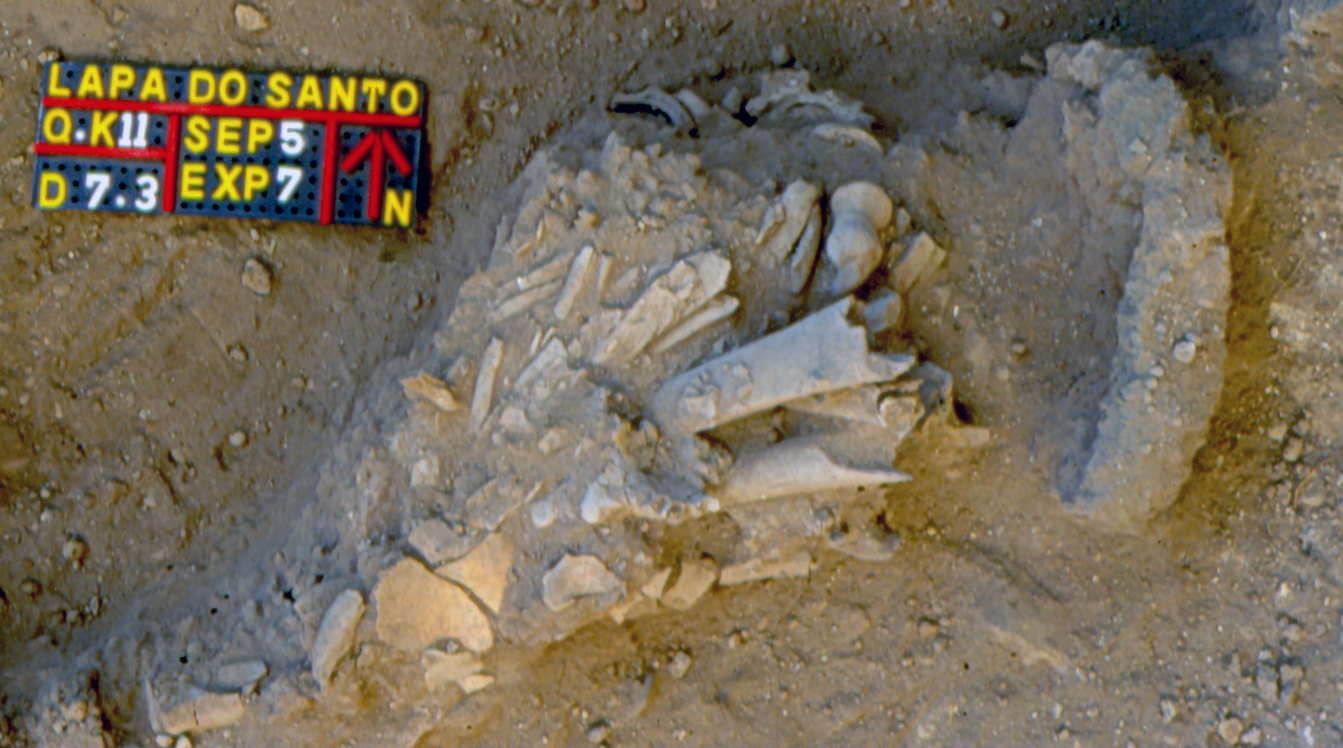
Burial 5. Excavation at phase 7.

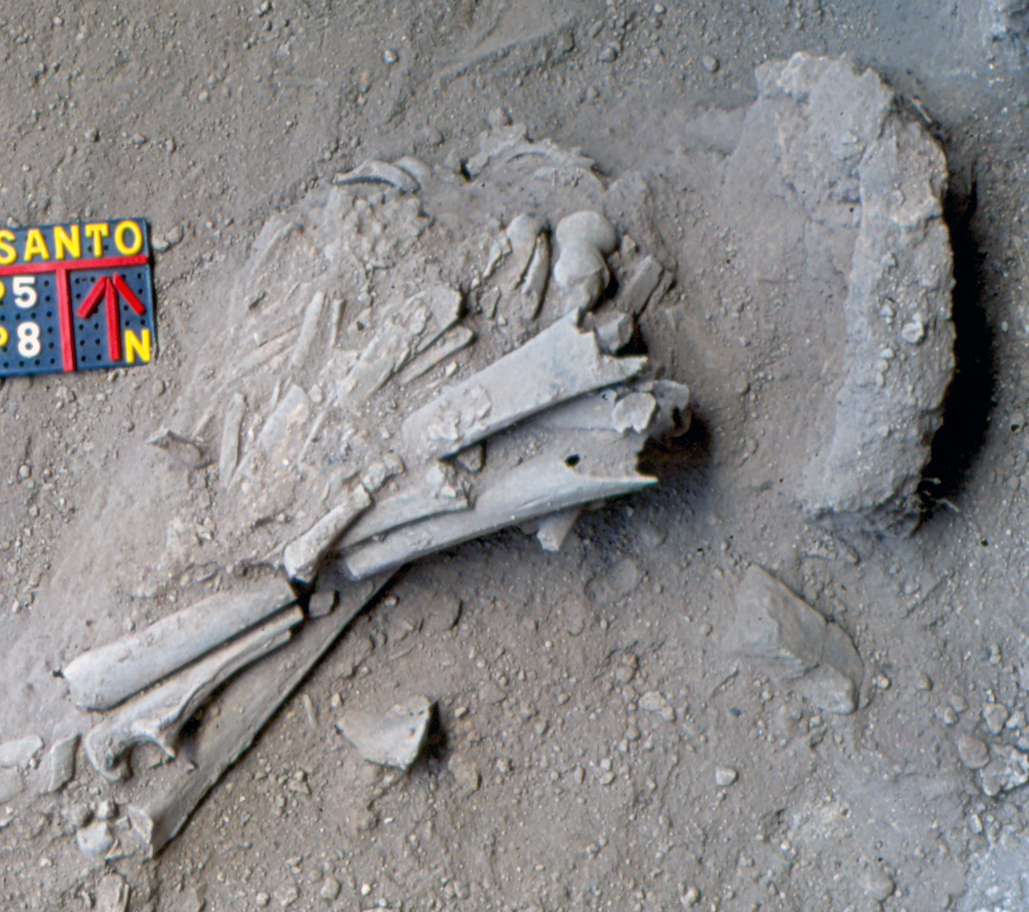
Burial 5. Excavation at phase 8.

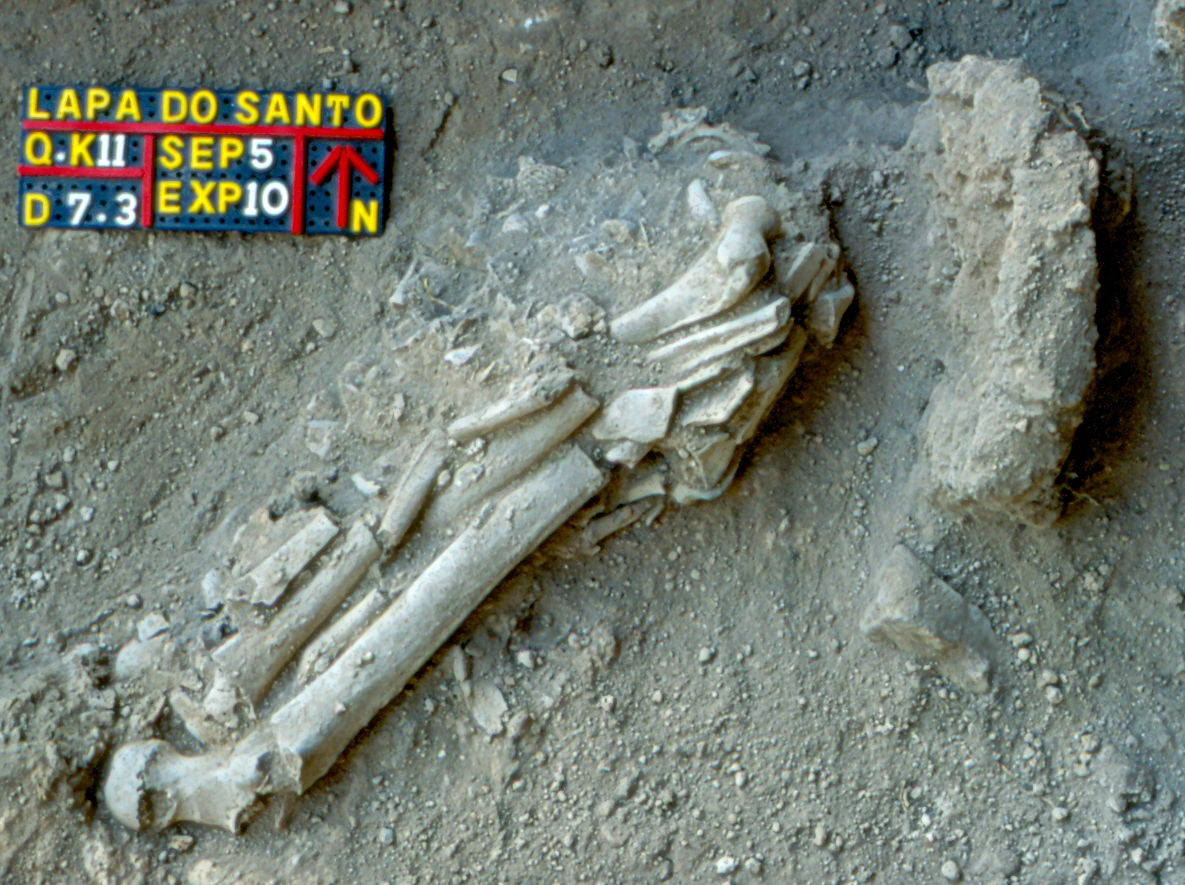
Burial 5. Excavation at phase 10.

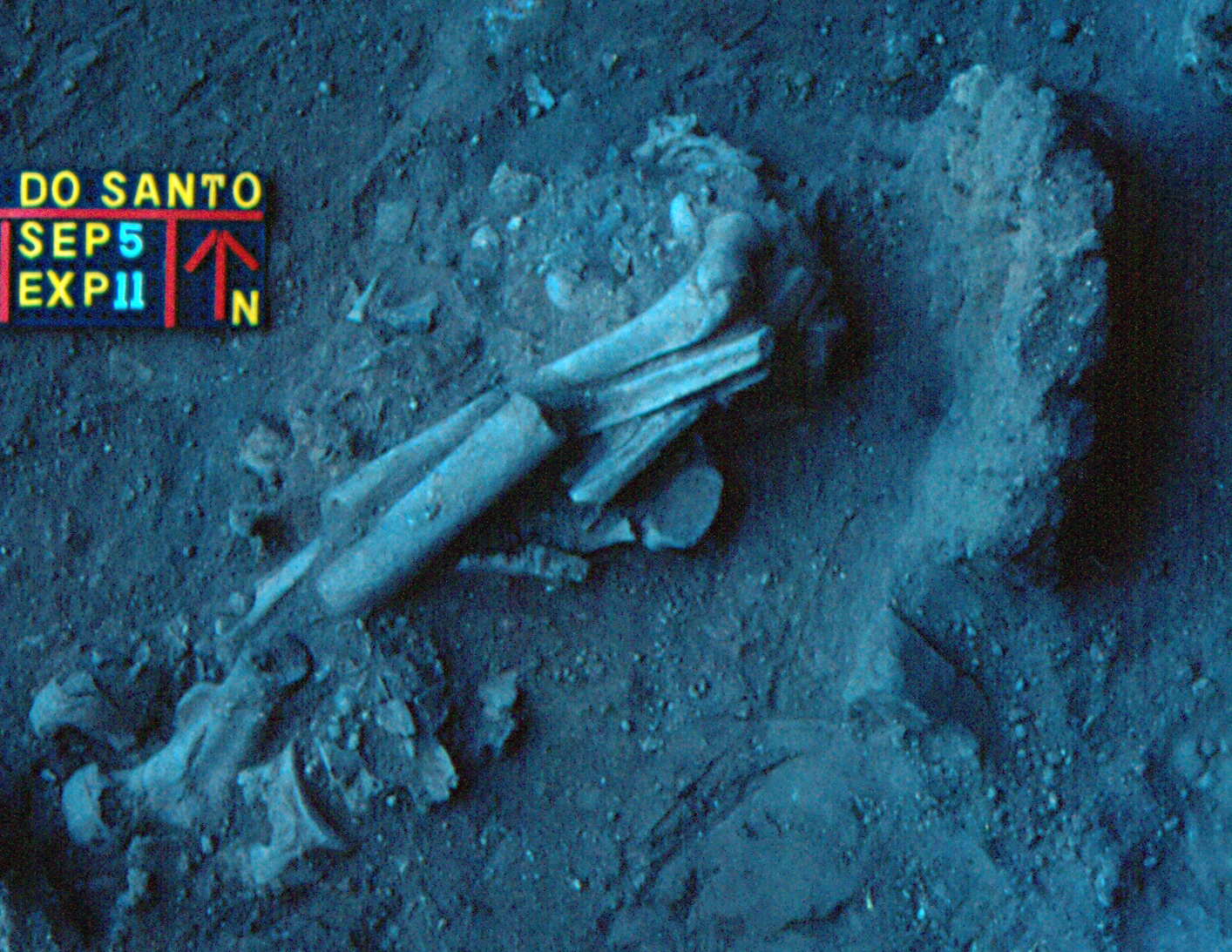
Burial 5. Excavation at phase 11.

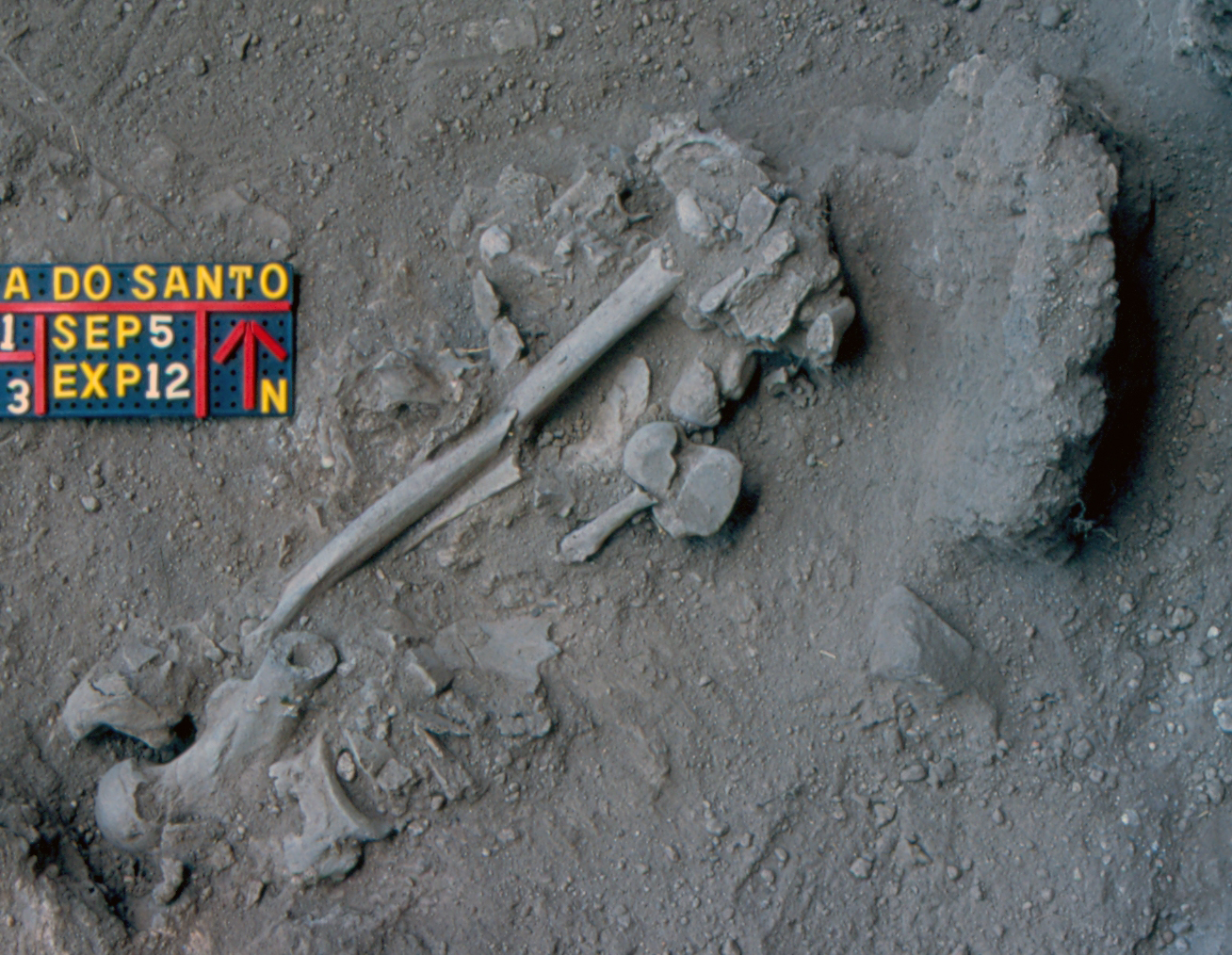
Burial 5. Excavation at phase 12.

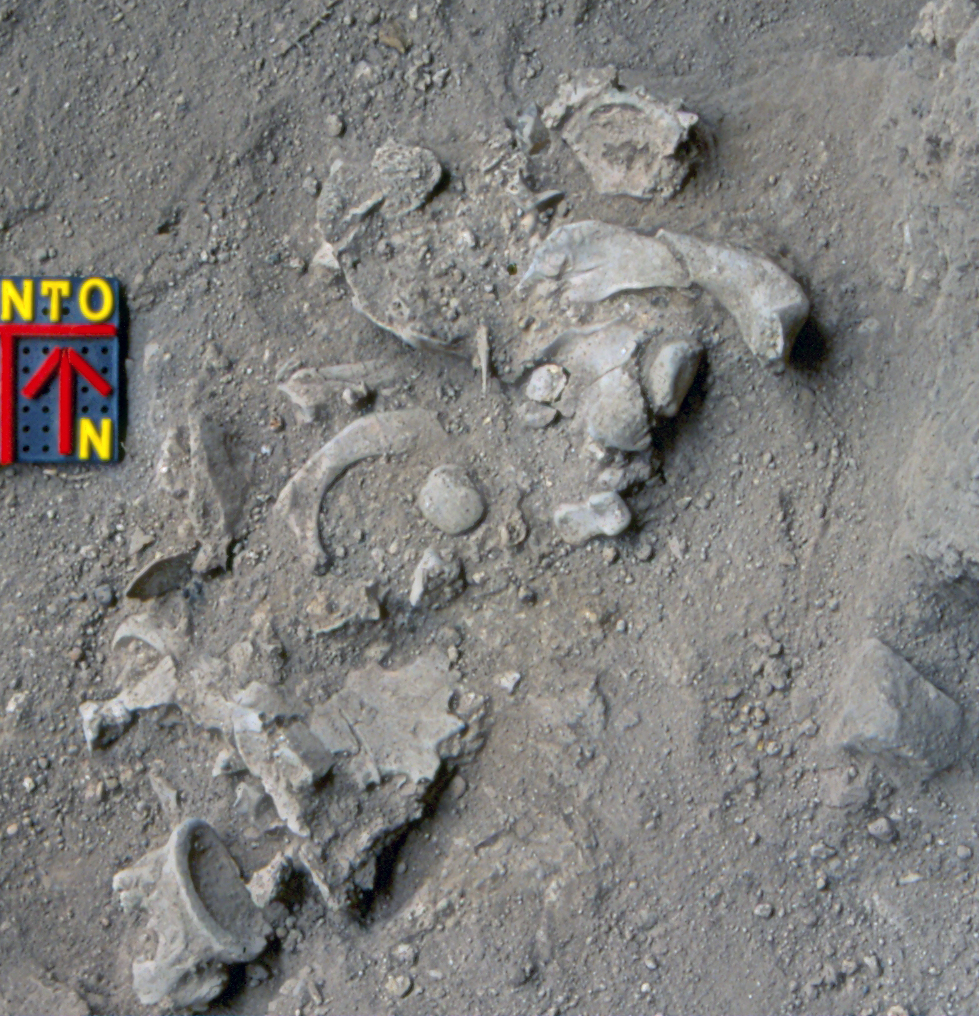
Burial 5. Excavation at phase 13.

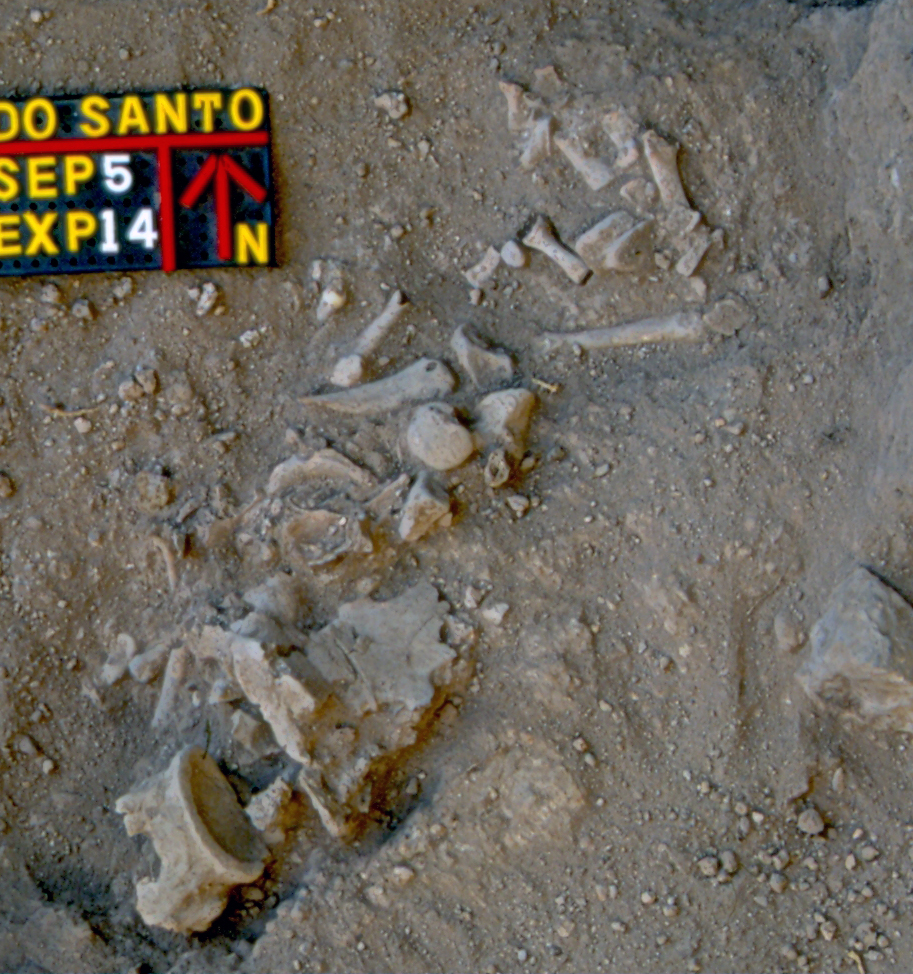
Burial 5. Excavation at phase 14.

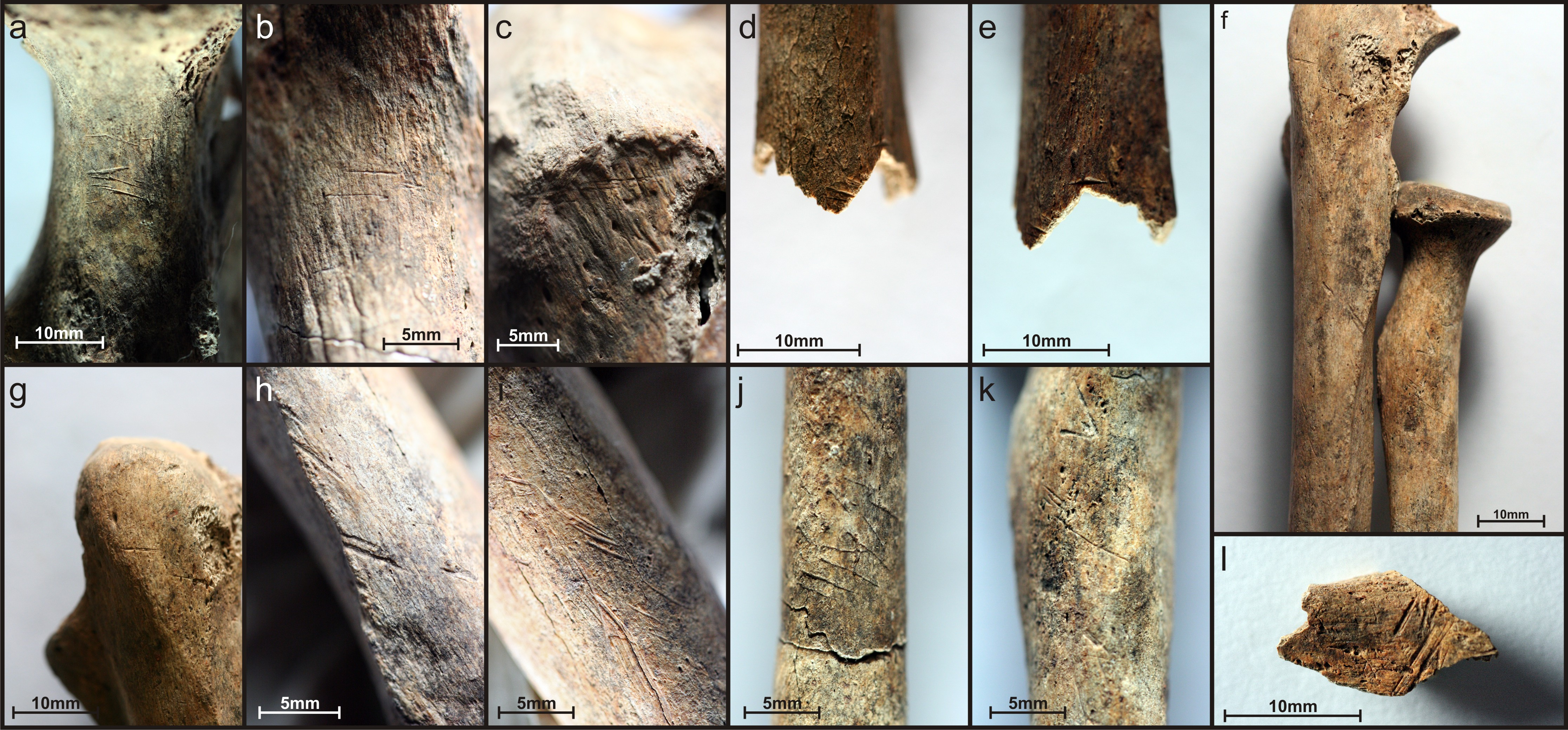
Burial 5 - Abundance of defleshing marks on human bones.

=== Lapa do Santo Mortuary Pattern 6 ===
Lapa do Santo Mortuary Pattern 6 (LSMP-6) includes Burial 8, the single total cremation case from Lapa do Santo, something rare also in the Lagoa Santa region as whole. The calcinated bones of a single adult female (?) individual were inside a circular pit. Charcoals were not found in association with the bones.

Lapa do Santo - Burial 8

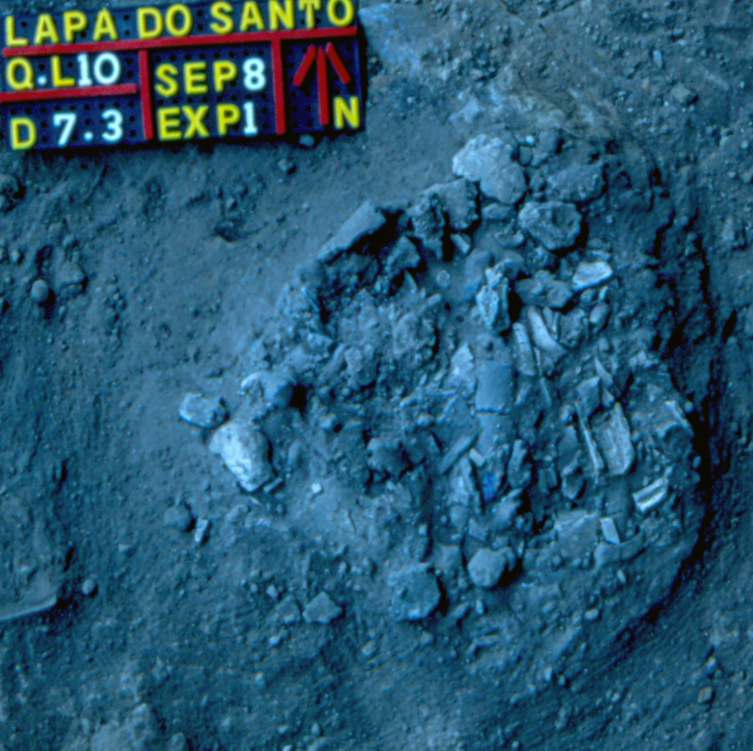
Burial 8. Excavation at phase 1.

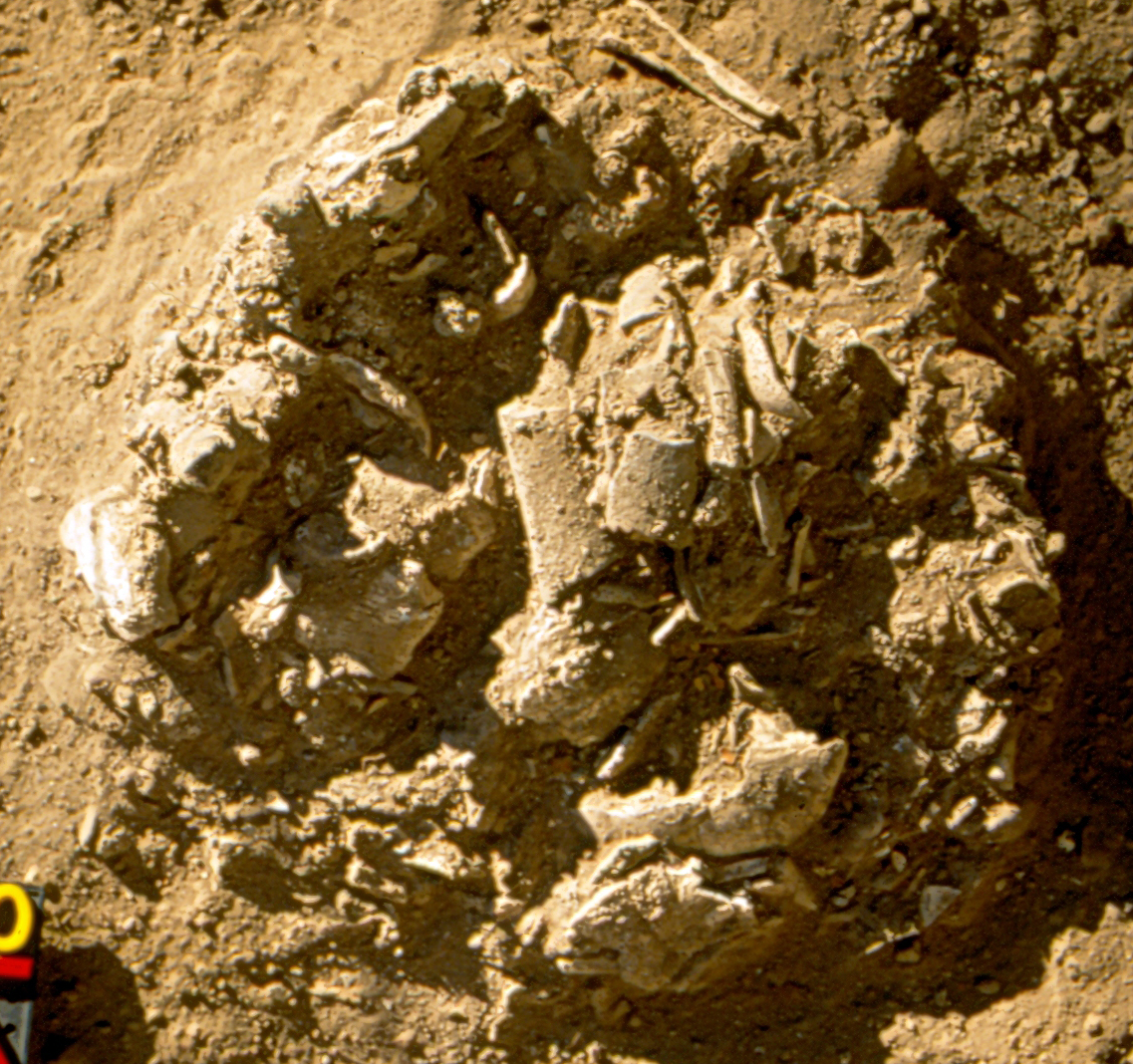
Burial 8. Excavation at phase 3.

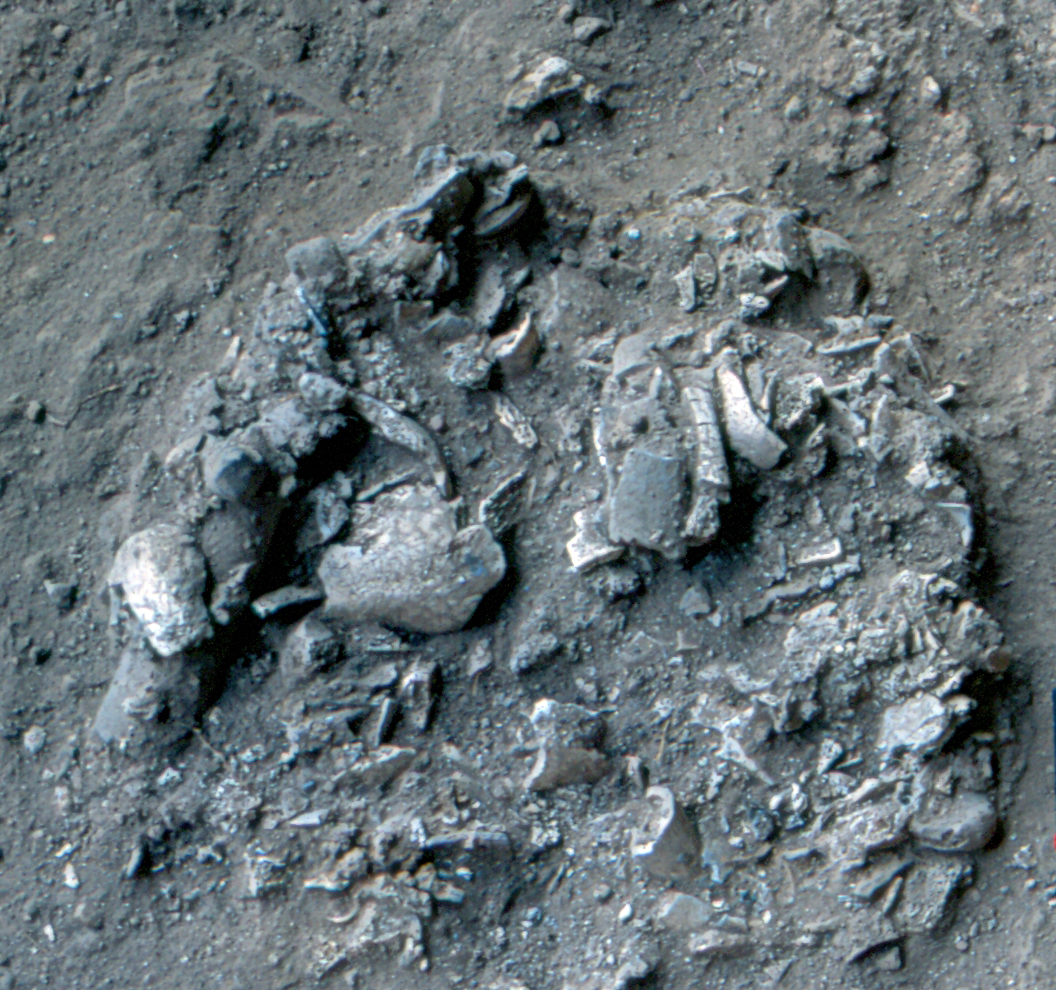
Burial 8. Excavation at phase 4.

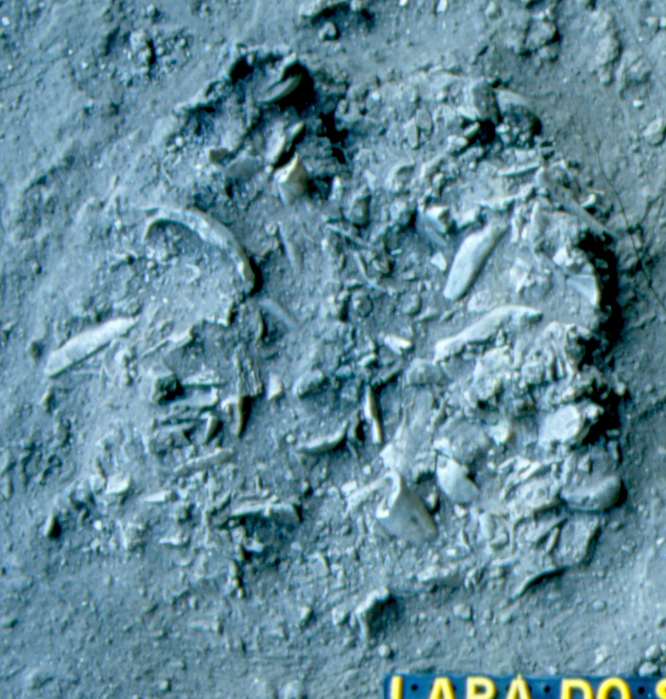
Burial 8. Excavation at phase 5.

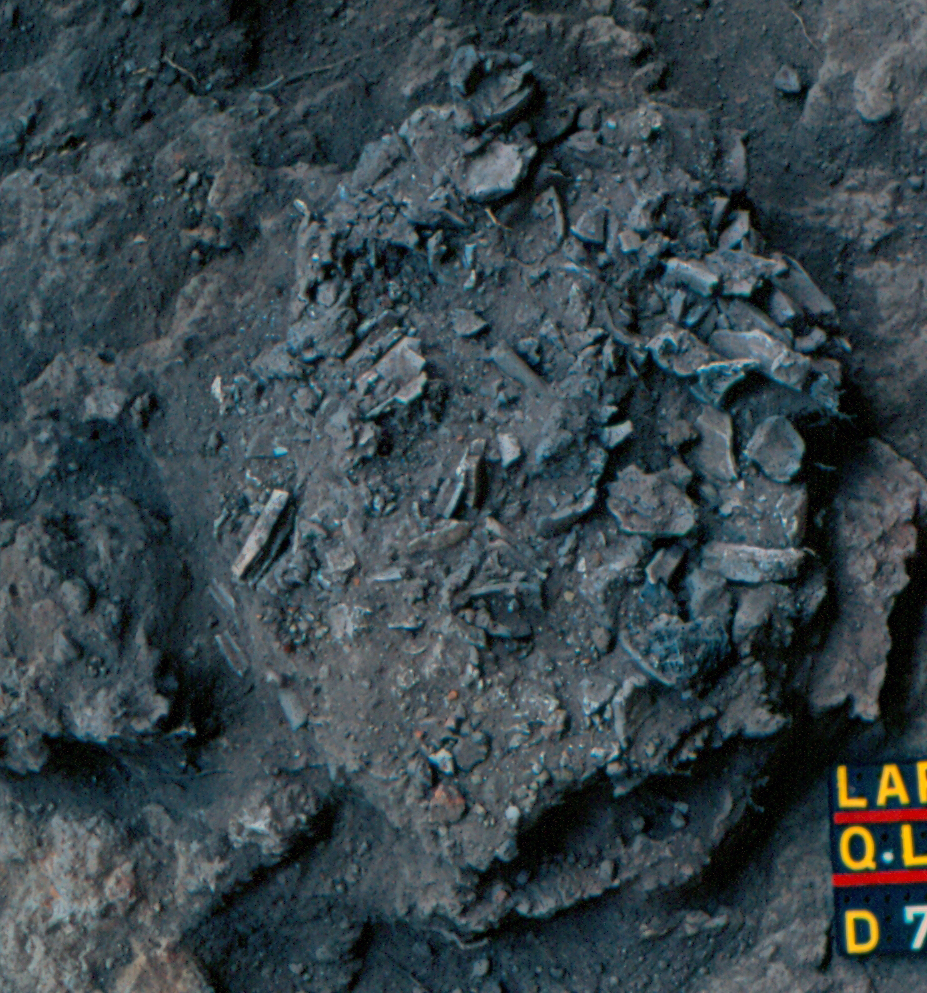
Burial 8. Excavation at phase 7.

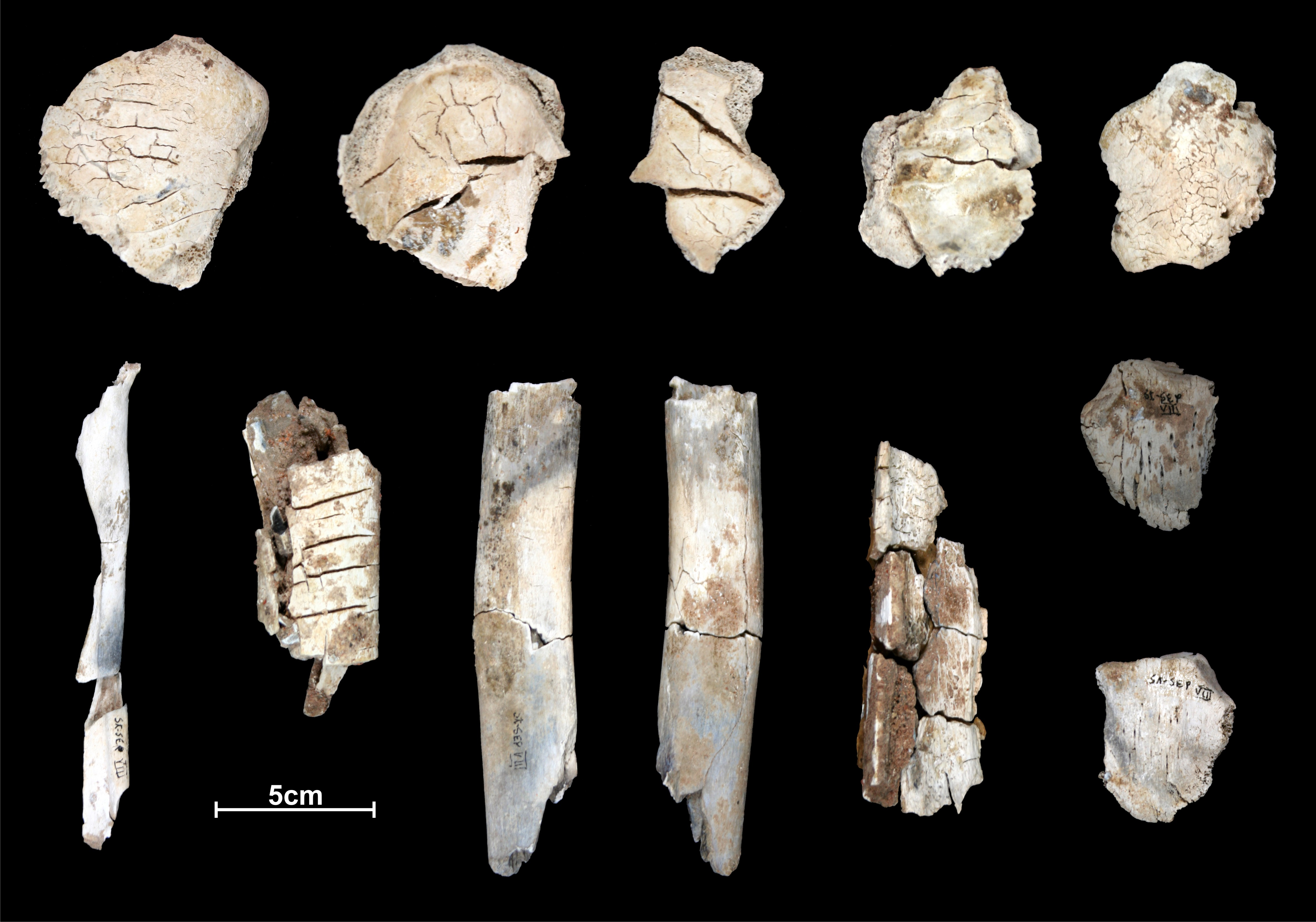
Burial 8. Calcinated bones.
