= List of St. George Dragons players =

This is a list of rugby league footballers who have played first grade for the St. George Dragons. Players are listed in the order they made their debut.

== Players ==
Club
No.	Name	Career	Appearances	Tries	Goals	Field goals	Points
1	Roy Bossi	1921	5	0	0	0	0
2	Tommy Burns	1921–1926	55	10	2	0	34
3	George Carstairs	1921–1929	78	11	79	0	191
4	Jack Clark	1921	3	0	0	0	0
5	Sid Field	1921	2	0	0	0	0
6	Reg Fusedale	1921–1922	17	0	8	0	16
7	Herb Gilbert	1921	8	1	0	0	3
8	Frank Gray	1921–1922, 1928–1929	33	7	0	0	21
9	Ernie Lapham	1921–1924, 1929	53	11	0	0	33
10	Tony Redmond	1921	7	1	0	0	3
11	Norm Shadlow	1921–1926	52	13	0	0	39
12	Clarrie Tye	1921–1927	78	11	0	0	33
13	Lyall Wall	1921	8	0	24	0	48
14	Lew Heuschkel	1921–1922	4	0	0	0	0
15	Edward Grainger	1921	1	0	0	0	0
16	Albert Johnston	1921–1922	9	0	0	0	0
17	Frank Wilkins	1921–1922	8	0	0	0	0
18	Ernie Wilson	1921–1922	5	1	0	0	3
19	Abe Clark	1921–1922	2	0	0	0	0
20	Tom Killiby	1921–1932	43	6	0	0	18
21	Tom Molloy	1921–1922	7	0	1	0	2
22	Hilton Dadswell	1922	6	1	0	0	3
23	Jim Dwyer	1922	5	0	0	0	0
24	Harold Hadley	1922	1	0	0	0	0
25	Harold King	1922–1923	18	0	0	0	0
26	Jim Morris	1922–1926	35	2	0	0	6
27	Sidney Buttel	1922	3	0	0	0	0
28	Arnold Traynor	1922–1930	96	28	46	0	176
29	Gordon Turner	1922–1924	3	0	0	0	0
30	Roy Beiber	1922	1	0	0	0	0
31	Des Mullarkey	1922	13	5	1	0	17
32	Jim Sibraa	1922	2	0	0	0	0
33	R Jackson	1922	4	2	0	0	6
34	Harry Flower	1922–1930	54	6	0	0	18
35	Arthur Gore	1922–1923	27	0	1	0	2
36	Bill Sadlier	1922–1923	10	4	0	0	12
37	S Neale	1922	7	0	0	0	0
38	A Anderson	1922	2	0	0	0	0
39	Jim Anderson	1922	2	0	0	0	0
40	George Gibbs	1922–1923	3	0	0	0	0
41	Arthur Justice	1922–1932	111	12	0	0	36
42	Edward Cummings	1923	11	0	0	0	0
43	Fred Hume	1923–1926	39	5	0	0	15
44	H "Bluey" McGillan	1923	4	0	0	0	0
45	Huatahi 'Brownie' Paki	1923	15	3	0	0	9
46	Tom Peters	1923–1926	33	0	0	0	0
47	Frank Saunders	1923–1929	75	50	20	0	190
48	Percy Gabbe	1923–1926	26	2	0	0	6
49	Bill Hardman	1924–1931	94	13	0	0	39
50	Aub Kelly	1924–1929	52	13	1	0	41
51	David Bowen	1924–1926	4	1	0	0	3
52	Alex Main	1924	1	0	0	0	0
53	Dick Burke	1925	8	1	0	0	3
54	Walter Slockie	1925	6	5	0	0	15
55	Phil McSorley	1925–1927	29	2	0	0	6
56	Ern Chambers	1925–1926	9	0	0	0	0
57	Jimmy Ramsay	1925–1926	8	0	0	0	0
58	Cec Whelan	1926	8	0	0	0	0
59	Ronald Conn	1926	5	0	0	0	0
60	Frank Meighan	1926–1928	38	2	1	0	8
61	A Falconer	1926	1	0	0	0	0
62	E Murray	1926	2	0	0	0	0
63	Albert Harry	1926	2	1	0	0	3
64	H Gilmore	1926	3	0	0	0	0
65	Joe Foley	1926	4	1	0	0	3
66	Arthur Williams	1926–1928	20	11	0	0	33
67	Victor Catrios	1926	2	0	0	0	0
68	Jack Parsons	1926	4	0	0	0	0
69	Lennie Guest	1926–1929	38	11	81	0	195
70	Bill Benson	1927	16	0	0	0	0
71	Stan Brain	1927–1933	63	15	0	0	45
72	Frank Burge	1927	18	9	0	0	27
73	Eric McCormack	1927–1932	12	4	28	0	68
74	Jim Warwick	1927–1929	31	10	0	0	30
75	Gus Larkin	1927	3	0	0	0	0
76	Harry Hoey	1927–1929	13	2	0	0	6
77	Jack McCormack	1927–1932	50	1	10	0	23
78	Hilton Delaney	1928	14	3	0	0	9
79	Jack Shumack	1928	3	3	0	0	0
80	George Torpy	1928	2	1	0	0	3
81	Bill Ives	1928	2	0	0	0	0
82	A Casey	1928	1	0	0	0	0
83	A Fairhall	1928	3	0	0	0	0
84	Jack Mogridge	1928–1929	13	0	0	0	0
85	George Brown	1928	1	0	0	0	0
86	Jerry Brien	1929	4	0	0	0	0
87	George Ward	1929–1934	44	6	0	0	18
88	Jim Wearmouth	1929–1931	29	7	0	0	21
89	Jack Dempsey	1929	14	0	4	0	8
90	Eric Freestone	1929–1932	48	16	32	0	112
91	Percy Fairall	1929–1937	90	21	9	0	81
92	Norm Fleming	1929–1933	16	4	0	0	12
93	Fred Gardner	1929–1935	82	38	8	0	130
94	Reg Schuman	1929–1935	61	3	0	0	9
95	Jack Rodwell	1929	1	0	0	0	0
96	Walter Greenlands	1929–1930	24	2	0	0	6
97	Allan Woods	1930–1933	13	1	0	0	3
98	Tom Crew	1930	6	0	0	0	0
99	Ces Hyland	1930–1933	46	4	48	0	108
100	Alf Sadler	1930	3	0	0	0	0
101	Jack Brierley	1930–1936	26	6	0	0	18
102	Jack Lennox	1930–1932	40	3	0	0	9
103	Jim Flower	1930–1931, 1935–1936	26	4	1	0	14
104	Bernard Martin	1930–1934 1937–1938	47	18	0	0	54
105	Joe Sharp	1930–1932	23	1	0	0	3
106	Joe Brennan	1931–1932	11	1	7	0	17
107	Ed Courtney Jr.	1931	6	1	0	0	3
108	Harry Kadwell	1931–1934	46	8	61	0	146
109	Dave Hey	1931	1	0	0	0	0
110	Reg Phipps	1931	12	3	0	0	9
111	Sid Loudoun	1931–1939	34	8	0	0	24
112	Stan Lawes	1931	1	0	0	0	0
113	P Davies	1931	2	0	0	0	0
114	Stan Robinson	1931–1937	70	2	36	0	78
115	T McArthur	1931	7	1	0	0	3
116	Len Brennan	1932–1934	40	20	1	0	62
117	Mick Crowe	1932–1937	12	5	0	0	15
118	Reg McPherson	1932	4	1	0	0	3
119	Harry Pierce	1932–1933	19	1	0	0	3
120	Charles Rice	1932–1937	54	5	0	0	15
121	Tom Carey	1932–1934	14	3	3	0	15
122	Norm Tipping	1932–1944	25	1	0	0	3
123	J Walsh	1932	4	0	0	0	0
124	Clarrie Kemp	1932–1933	13	1	0	0	3
125	Cyril Skinner	1932	1	0	0	0	0
126	Ernest Neary	1932	1	0	0	0	0
127	Jim Rutherford	1933–1937	47	20	0	0	60
128	Bill Killiby	1933–1940	37	11	0	0	33
129	Max Hollingsworth	1933–1935	19	7	0	0	21
130	Edward Martin	1933	3	0	0	0	0
131	Tom Hayward	1933–1940	56	5	0	0	15
132	Jack Lynch	1933, 1937	29	6	4	0	26
133	Dick Daley	1933–1934	6	0	0	0	0
134	Len Kelly	1933–1944	160	59	0	0	177
135	Alan Sprouster	1933	7	2	0	0	6
136	Harry Courtney	1934	4	0	0	0	0
137	Wayne Martin	1934	1	0	0	0	0
138	B Moore	1934	1	1	0	0	3
139	Les Griffin	1935	14	7	25	0	125
140	Robert Grotte	1935–1937	13	1	0	0	3
141	Bill McGrath	1935	6	0	0	0	0
142	Edward Root	1935–1936	24	3	0	0	9
143	Bill Ryan	1935	7	1	3	0	9
144	Pat White	1935	6	2	0	0	6
145	Stan Bradshaw	1935	2	0	0	0	0
146	Jack Gray-Spence	1935	1	0	0	0	0
147	Les Polychrone	1935–1939	6	0	0	0	0
148	Harry Hodson	1935	3	0	0	0	0
149	Keith Murray	1935	4	1	0	0	3
150	Jack Eason	1935	2	0	0	0	0
151	Bill Summerell	1935–1938	16	5	1	0	17
152	Colin Fitzpatrick	1936–1937	2	0	0	0	0
153	Eric Hughes	1936	9	3	0	0	9
154	Lance Ireland	1936	6	2	0	0	6
155	Ernest Ranier	1936–1937	16	6	1	0	20
156	Mat Ryan	1936	10	4	14	0	40
157	Tommy Wills	1936	7	1	0	0	3
158	Les Abbott	1936–1937	16	2	0	0	6
159	Jim Duff	1936–1937	10	5	0	0	15
160	Jack Simpson	1936	3	0	0	0	0
161	Eddie Bowen	1936	3	0	0	0	0
162	Norm Pritchard	1936	1	0	0	0	0
163	Jack Colquhon	1936	1	0	0	0	0
164	Ron Frederickson	1936–1940	42	5	0	0	15
165	Bill Hale	1936	10	0	0	0	0
166	Nelson Hardy	1936	2	0	0	0	0
167	Bert Delavere	1936	1	1	1	0	5
168	Luke McWilliams	1937	3	1	0	0	3
169	Cyril Holt	1937–1945	29	5	49	0	113
170	Norm Pope	1937–1938	20	2	1	0	8
171	Jack Wedgwood	1937–1941	53	2	10	0	26
172	Dick O'Connor	1937–1938	5	3	0	0	9
173	Jack Charles	1938	7	0	0	0	0
174	Herb Gilbert Jr.	1938–1943	89	12	2	0	40
175	Reg Hopkinson	1938–1940	41	3	0	0	9
176	Jack Lindwall	1938–1949	133	110	99	0	528
177	Ray Pratt	1938–1941	14	0	44	0	88
178	Jim Schuback	1938–1940	38	6	0	0	18
179	Jack Osborne	1938	3	0	0	0	0
180	Dave Ross	1938–1945	14	4	0	0	12
181	Gordon Hart	1938–1941	43	16	0	0	48
182	Albert McAndrew	1938–1945	69	17	0	0	51
183	Neil Whittaker	1938	1	0	0	0	0
184	Hilton Curran	1938	4	2	0	0	6
185	Jack Bates	1939	11	4	0	0	12
186	Allan Boler	1939–1940	21	3	12	0	33
187	Charlie Hazelton	1939–1940	26	27	0	0	81
188	Neville Smith	1939–1943	59	15	118	0	281
189	Alex Ringland	1939	1	1	0	0	3
190	Tim Allen	1939	2	0	0	0	0
191	Keith Benson	1940–1941	9	5	1	0	17
192	Col Maxwell	1940	9	4	0	0	1
193	Cliff Kelly	1940–1941	7	2	0	0	6
194	Roy Hasson	1940–1944	23	4	5	0	22
195	Tiger Black	1940	2	0	0	0	0
196	Overton Keightley	1940	3	0	0	0	0
197	Ray Lindwall	1940–1946	31	7	123	0	267
198	Noel Jones	1940–1947	60	24	4	0	80
199	Owen Campbell	1941–1945	56	26	0	0	78
200	Charlie Montgomery	1941–1942	32	10	1	0	32
201	Lindsay Spencer	1941–1942	25	4	0	0	12
202	Bill Tyquin	1941	15	8	0	0	24
203	Les Morley	1941–1948	13	0	0	0	0
204	Jack Gilbert	1941–1946	8	2	0	0	4
205	Jim Hale	1941–1947	60	20	0	0	60
206	Jack Morley	1941	1	0	0	0	0
207	Athol Nixon	1941	1	0	0	0	0
208	Alastair Clarke	1942–1945	13	1	0	0	3
209	Alf Cox	1942–1945	37	4	7	0	26
210	Barney McLure	1942	5	1	1	0	5
211	Bill McRitchie	1942–1945	40	1	0	0	3
212	Doug McRitchie	1942–1950	81	25	0	0	75
213	Bill Collier	1942–1943	28	2	0	0	6
214	Bill Middleton	1942–1943	11	1	0	0	3
215	Ted McHugh	1942–1944	32	4	6	0	24
216	Ken Foster	1942	5	2	0	0	6
217	Cedric Turvey	1942	6	1	0	0	3
218	Eric Lawrence	1942	3	0	0	0	0
219	Ron Gill	1943	16	7	0	0	21
220	Spencer Walklate	1943	15	2	3	0	12
221	Mick Craigie	1944–1945	12	4	0	0	12
222	Jack Metcalf	1943–1944	22	3	0	0	9
223	Roy Duncan	1943	2	1	0	0	3
224	Leo Doyle	1944–1945	27	8	44	0	112
225	Max Hayward	1944–1947	37	7	0	0	21
226	Frank Johnson	1944–1945	23	1	0	0	3
227	Morrie Slavin	1944	2	0	0	0	0
228	Jack Syme	1944–1945	11	2	0	0	6
229	Nigel Watts	1944–1945	15	1	10	0	23
230	Frank Mulheron	1944	12	0	0	0	0
231	Tom Dean	1944	1	0	0	0	0
232	Ted McGovern	1944	1	0	0	0	0
233	Pat Quinn	1944–1945	16	7	0	0	21
234	Reg Devine	1944–1946	22	10	0	0	30
235	Russell Madden	1944	9	2	0	0	6
236	Fred Brown	1945–1947	26	9	9	0	45
237	Dick Healy	1945–1948	33	8	0	0	24
238	Arthur Law	1945	4	1	0	0	3
239	Jack McPherson	1945–1948	31	1	0	0	3
240	Walter Mussing	1945–1946	37	13	0	0	39
241	Bob Gilbert	1945	4	0	0	0	0
242	Tom Vaughan	1945	2	0	0	0	0
243	Frank Beazley	1945	4	0	0	0	0
244	Bob James	1945–1946	6	1	0	0	3
245	Terry Beers	1945	4	0	0	0	0
246	Dan Munro	1945–1946	7	0	7	0	14
247	Bill Frendin	1945	2	0	0	0	0
248	Ken Banks	1946	15	0	0	0	0
249	Allan Ling	1946	2	1	0	0	3
250	Jack Munn	1946–1949, 1951	42	8	1	0	26
251	Herb Narvo	1946	13	3	8	0	25
252	Jock Tradd	1946	3	1	1	0	5
253	Ray Ainsworth	1946	4	1	0	0	3
254	Don Graham	1946–1947	16	2	0	0	6
255	Chick Donnelley	1946–1947	21	2	0	0	6
256	Greg Dennis	1947	8	3	0	0	9
257	Frank Facer	1947–1950	74	2	0	0	6
258	Jack Holland	1947–1952	87	27	3	0	87
259	Noel Pidding	1947–1953	104	34	248	0	598
260	Stan Root	1947–1950	27	18	42	0	138
261	Ernie Mort	1947–1950	25	3	0	0	9
262	Vince Soorley	1947–1948	27	1	0	0	3
263	Tom Chilvers	1947	2	0	0	0	0
264	Kevin Harmey	1947–1950	25	13	0	0	39
265	Lew Evans	1947–1948	20	7	0	0	21
266	Geoff Pullen	1947–1948	7	0	23	0	46
267	Mick Fahey	1947–1948	17	6	0	0	18
268	George Jardine	1947–1952	60	9	1	0	29
269	Jack Finnie	1948	10	5	0	0	15
270	Noel Hill	1948–1950	58	7	0	0	21
271	Matt McCoy	1948–1952	67	26	66	8	208
272	Bruce McLennan	1948	3	0	0	0	0
273	Russell McCarthy	1948–1952	8	0	0	0	0
274	Charlie Banks	1948–1949	25	8	0	0	24
275	Tom Briggs	1948–1949	17	16	0	0	48
276	James Murray	1948–1950	7	0	0	0	0
277	Les Turner	1948–1949	3	0	0	0	0
278	Billy Wilson	1948–1962	174	17	1	0	53
279	Frank Delaney	1948	1	0	0	0	0
280	Ken McKenzie	1948–1952	16	7	8	0	37
281	Ross Fielder	1948–1951	39	7	0	0	21
282	Fred Sheppard	1948	1	1	0	0	3
283	Johnny Hawke	1949–1952	56	8	3	0	30
284	Ron Roberts	1949–1951	51	51	0	0	153
285	Carl Langton	1949–1950	19	3	0	0	9
286	Doug Fleming	1949–1957	120	12	281	0	598
287	Harry Melville	1949–1957	87	19	0	0	57
288	Bob Bower	1950–1953	71	9	0	0	27
289	Noel Mulligan	1950–1951	32	4	0	0	12
290	Bruce Burgess	1950–1951	15	10	0	0	30
291	Trevor Whitehead	1950	6	2	0	0	6
292	Frank Baker	1950–1951	10	4	0	0	3
293	Peter Carroll	1951–1958	102	24	0	0	72
294	Ted Dawson	1951	11	2	0	0	6
295	Ted Glossop	1951–1957	15	1	0	0	3
296	Norm Provan	1951–1965	256	63	1	0	191
297	Tommy Ryan	1951–1953, 1555–1958	94	81	0	0	243
298	Col Hudson	1951	3	1	0	0	3
299	Ken Watson	1951	1	0	0	0	0
300	Ray Lawless	1951	3	0	0	0	0
301	Neville Gosson	1951	9	1	0	0	3
302	Kevin Hole	1951–1957	50	47	0	0	141
303	Ken Kearney	1952–1961	156	18	2	0	58
304	Ron Stanton	1952	10	0	4	0	8
305	Mick Mullane Sr.	1952–1953	12	3	1	0	11
306	Mick Franklin	1952	3	0	0	0	0
307	Ross Kite	1952–1957	87	49	49	0	245
308	Lance Fitzgerald	1952–1953	7	2	5	0	16
309	Barry Passfield	1952–1953	29	9	0	0	27
310	Allan Staunton	1952–1954	42	13	2	0	43
311	Leo Hurley	1952	8	1	0	0	3
312	Frank Narvo	1952–1953	4	2	0	0	6
313	Ted Green	1952	1	0	0	0	0
314	Kevin Wilson	1952	1	0	0	0	0
315	Peter Bracken	1953	17	0	0	0	0
316	Noel Cooper	1953	2	2	0	0	6
317	Warwick Conroy	1953	1	0	0	0	0
318	Len Johnson	1953	5	1	0	0	3
319	Kevin Brown	1953–1961	129	33	0	0	99
320	Merv Lees	1953–1958	56	35	0	0	105
321	Ray Birks	1953–1955	6	0	0	0	0
322	Owen Bevan	1954	1	0	0	0	0
323	Keith Gittoes	1954	18	7	0	0	21
324	Jack Holden	1954	13	3	0	0	9
325	Bruce Hopkins	1954	3	0	0	0	0
326	Kevin O'Brien	1954–1958	65	38	17	0	148
327	Bryan Orrock	1954–1958	54	9	0	0	27
328	Bob Smith	1954	10	3	0	0	9
329	Paul Broughton	1954	7	1	0	0	3
330	Jim McIntyre	1954–1955	5	0	0	0	0
331	Ray Thompson	1954	5	0	0	0	0
332	Jack Baxter	1954	4	1	0	0	3
333	Geoff Weekes	1954–1961	64	30	0	0	90
334	Kevin Malby	1954	2	0	0	0	0
335	Billy McNamara	1954–1955	23	1	0	0	3
336	Sid Pert Jr.	1954–1957	40	11	0	0	33
337	Bob Bugden	1954–1961	135	57	0	0	171
338	Barry van Heekeren	1955	5	0	0	0	0
339	Bill Dwyer	1955	1	0	0	0	0
340	Ken Moffatt	1955	3	0	0	0	0
341	Brian Henderson	1955–1957	6	0	0	0	0
342	Kevin Bourne	1955	3	0	0	0	0
343	Fred Gardner Jr.	1955	3	1	0	0	3
344	Reg Cooper	1955	1	0	0	0	0
345	Brian Graham	1955–1964	114	20	287	0	634
346	Johnny Horsley	1956	4	0	0	0	0
347	Peter Provan	1956–1960	18	2	0	0	6
348	Robert 'Bobby' May	1956	1	0	0	0	0
349	Harry Bath	1957–1959	60	10	240	0	510
350	Brian Clay	1957–1967	183	33	0	0	99
351	Les Hardy	1957	2	1	0	0	3
352	Eddie Lumsden	1957–1966	158	136	17	0	442
353	Peter Armstrong	1957–1964	52	8	0	0	24
354	Jack Fifield	1957–1958	37	20	0	0	60
355	Ken Anderson	1957–1958	2	0	0	0	0
356	Ray Smith	1957–1959	16	5	0	0	15
357	Brian Messiter	1958–1961	35	28	0	0	84
358	Monty Porter	1958–1965	119	13	0	0	39
359	Reg Gasnier	1959–1967	125	127	20	0	421
360	Johnny Raper	1959–1969	185	47	4	0	149
361	Johnny Riley	1959–1964	61	22	0	0	66
362	Kevin Neal	1959–1960	2	0	0	0	0
363	John Stathers	1959–1962	20	5	0	0	15
364	Dave Brown	1960–1962	51	12	0	0	36
365	Kevin Ryan	1960–1966	106	19	0	0	57
366	Peter Dickenson	1960	1	0	0	0	0
367	Sam Martin	1960	1	0	0	0	0
368	Ron Stephens	1960	2	0	0	0	0
369	Fred Strutt	1960	2	0	0	0	0
370	Johnny King	1960–1971	191	143	7	0	443
371	Keith Glen	1961–1963	5	0	0	0	0
372	Duncan Page	1961	1	1	0	0	3
373	Billy Smith	1961–1977	234	30	3	44	161
374	George Evans	1962–1968	68	11	0	0	33
375	Johnny Greaves	1962–1963	28	16	0	0	48
376	Dinny O'Bryan	1962	16	4	0	0	12
377	Elton Rasmussen	1962–1968	126	21	49	0	161
378	Ian Walsh	1962–1967	94	4	0	0	12
379	Garry MacDougall	1962–1963	11	0	0	0	0
380	Brian James	1962–1963	16	5	0	0	15
381	Bob Laird	1962	2	0	0	0	0
382	Kevin McDonald	1962–1963	6	0	18	0	36
383	Ken Potter	1962	3	0	0	0	0
384	Robin Gourley	1963–1966	1	0	0	0	0
385	Terry Hayes	1963	1	1	0	0	3
386	Graeme Langlands	1963–1976	227	86	648	0	1554
387	Bruce Pollard	1963–1967	67	24	0	0	72
388	Dick Huddart	1964–1968	78	16	0	0	48
389	Lionel Simmons	1964	3	1	0	0	3
390	Bill Yeomans	1964	4	2	0	0	6
391	Alan McRitchie	1964–1966	4	2	0	0	6
392	David Burns	1965–1966	16	7	0	0	21
393	Ken Maddison	1965–1971	101	24	0	0	72
394	Ray Corkery	1965	3	0	0	0	0
395	Warren Ryan	1965	1	0	0	0	0
396	Edward Childs	1965	1	0	0	0	0
397	Allan McKean	1965, 1975	3	0	6	0	12
398	Barry Beath	1966–1977	198	61	0	0	183
399	Keith Maddison	1966–1972	68	5	0	0	15
400	Dennis Preston	1966–1971	74	21	201	0	465
401	Graham Turner	1966–1969	21	4	0	0	12
402	Trevor Levin	1966	5	0	0	0	0
403	Stan Gorton	1966–1971	56	37	0	0	111
404	John Maguire	1966	2	0	0	0	0
405	Grahame Bowen	1967–1972	75	13	0	0	39
406	Trevor Lake	1967–1968	8	4	0	0	12
407	John Love	1967	4	1	0	0	3
408	Colin Rasmussen	1967–1974	102	3	0	0	9
409	Dick Breaden	1967–1969	9	0	0	0	0
410	Graham Simmons	1967–1969	20	0	0	0	0
411	Gary Murphy	1967	1	0	0	0	0
412	Peter O'Hanlon	1967	2	0	0	0	0
413	Dennis Brandley	1968–1971	36	5	0	0	15
414	Tony Branson	1968–1973	91	23	2	3	76
415	Phil Hawthorne	1968–1971	56	5	1	56	128
416	Norm Henderson	1968–1971	42	6	0	0	18
417	Denis O'Callaghan	1968–1969	15	3	0	0	9
418	Apisai Toga	1968–1972	60	9	0	0	27
419	John Wittenberg	1968–1970	53	4	0	0	12
420	Kevin Gibson	1968, 1976	2	0	0	0	0
421	Peter Fitzgerald	1969–1975	95	7	0	0	21
422	Max Ninness	1969	3	0	0	0	0
423	Inisai Toga	1969–1974	12	0	0	0	0
424	Jeff Bell	1969–1973	14	1	6	0	14
425	P Turner	1969	1	0	0	0	0
426	Merv Boatswain	1970	2	0	0	0	0
427	Geoff Carr	1970–1974	59	27	0	0	81
428	Bob Clapham	1970–1973	20	5	0	0	15
429	Ross Strudwick	1970–1972	32	1	54	4	117
430	Frank Ryan	1970	4	0	2	0	4
431	Warren Thompson	1970	9	5	0	0	15
432	Ted Walton	1970–1972	14	3	0	0	9
433	Greg Cross	1970	2	0	0	0	0
434	Tom Jordan	1970	2	0	0	0	0
435	Mick Dryden	1970–1971	6	0	0	0	0
436	David Bell	1970–1971	10	0	0	0	0
437	John Geraghty	1970	1	0	0	0	0
438	G Fitzpatrick	1970	1	0	0	0	0
439	Ross Popplewell	1970	1	0	0	0	0
440	Kenneth Batty	1971–1973	1	0	0	0	0
441	Russell Cox	1971–1976	66	6	0	0	18
442	Harry Eden	1971–1973	26	7	0	0	21
443	Paul Mills	1971–1975	58	15	0	0	45
444	Brian Norton	1971–1974	43	5	0	0	15
445	Kevin O'Sullivan	1971	5	2	1	0	8
446	Graeme Sams	1971–1974	74	10	0	0	30
447	Garry Jenkins	1971	4	1	0	0	3
448	Barry Cox	1971	3	1	0	0	3
449	Mark Shulman	1971–1978	58	8	0	0	24
450	Brian Wood	1971–1976	16	2	0	0	6
451	Lindsay Drake	1972–1975	51	13	0	0	39
452	Roy Ferguson	1972–1976	100	30	0	0	90
453	Ted Goodwin	1972–1978	116	52	82	2	322
454	Kevin MacFarlane	1972–1974	40	5	0	0	15
455	John Peard	1972–1973	17	3	0	1	10
456	Rod Reddy	1972–1983	204	65	1	0	198
457	Max Cole	1972, 1976	11	5	0	0	15
458	Keith Hemsworth	1972	2	1	0	0	3
459	John Chapman	1973–1978	126	39	14	0	145
460	Dennis Corrigan	1973–1974	7	0	0	0	0
461	Steve Edge	1973–1979	103	15	0	0	45
462	Alan Hancock	1973	1	0	0	0	0
463	Gary Pethybridge	1973–1974	44	9	0	0	27
464	Gary Russell	1973	1	0	0	0	0
465	Tony White	1973	1	0	0	0	0
466	Barry Hulbert	1974–1976	40	3	35	0	79
467	Gary Souter	1974	13	0	0	0	0
468	Bruce Starkey	1974–1982	128	13	0	0	39
469	Brian Smith	1974	14	1	0	0	3
470	Barry Stumbles	1974	5	1	0	0	3
471	Peter Sullivan	1974	1	0	0	0	0
472	Robert Finch	1974–1980	118	26	0	0	78
473	Colin Bramley	1974–1979	17	4	0	0	12
474	Morrie Hutchinson	1974	2	0	0	0	0
475	George Foord	1974–1975	6	1	0	0	3
476	Ray Grigg	1974–1975	7	1	0	0	3
477	Henry Tatana	1975–1976	43	4	105	0	222
478	Steve Hurworth	1975–1976	13	2	0	0	6
479	Tony Quirk	1975–1977	28	7	19	0	59
480	John Bailey	1975–1977	39	4	0	0	12
481	Robert Stone	1975–1985	170	26	0	0	81
482	Colin Lowrie	1975	2	0	0	0	0
483	Michael Sorridimi	1975–1982	82	31	0	0	93
484	Steven Adams	1976	1	0	0	0	0
485	Owen O'Donnell	1976	15	3	0	0	15
486	John French	1976	2	0	0	0	0
487	John Jansen	1976–1983	101	21	0	0	65
488	George Grant	1976–1982	51	1	183	0	369
489	Alan Holmes	1976	1	0	0	0	0
490	Connell Byrne	1976–1978	4	0	0	0	0
491	Tony Graham	1977–1978	14	6	0	0	18
492	Lee Pomfret	1977	2	0	0	0	0
493	Graham Quinn	1977–1983	127	28	0	0	84
494	Craig Young	1977–1988	234	11	0	2	42
495	Rod McGregor	1977–1978	25	1	0	0	3
496	Steve Butler	1977–1979	41	12	0	0	36
497	Vince O'Sullivan	1977	1	0	0	0	0
498	Ken Kearney	1978–1979	29	6	19	1	57
499	Neil McDonnell	1978	1	0	0	0	0
500	Mitch Brennan	1978–1980	50	35	0	0	109
501	Brad Buchanan	1978–1983	34	0	0	0	0
502	Jack Jeffries	1978	7	0	0	0	0
503	Tony Trudgett	1978–1983	135	26	0	0	80
504	Grahame Buckley	1978–1984	59	6	0	0	19
505	Michael Bleakley	1978	1	0	0	0	0
506	John Dowling	1979–1984	117	13	15	0	70
507	Brian Johnson	1979–1985	149	54	0	0	138
508	Graeme Wynn	1979–1990	197	46	120	0	400
509	Steve Morris	1979–1986	180	102	0	0	357
510	Randall Barge	1979	1	0	0	0	0
511	Phillip Williams	1979	1	0	0	0	0
512	Phil Graham	1979–1982	32	6	27	0	72
513	Michael Lockwood	1979	1	0	0	0	0
514	Brian Johnston	1980–1989	167	61	0	0	233
515	Shane McKellar	1980	15	3	6	0	21
516	Garry Newham	1980–1983	5	0	0	0	0
517	John Conway	1980–1981	4	0	0	0	0
518	Pat Jarvis	1980–1986	121	7	0	0	27
519	Michael Beattie	1980–1992	211	63	0	3	245
520	Peter Cullen	1981	3	1	0	0	3
521	David Curry	1981	5	0	0	0	0
522	Kevin Kelly	1981–1982	12	4	1	1	15
523	Steve Halliwell	1981	1	0	0	0	0
524	Brad Wilson	1981–1982	9	5	24	0	63
525	Ivan Henjak	1981–1983, 1992	34	4	0	0	16
526	Denis Kinchela	1982–1986	45	13	0	0	45
527	Chris Walsh	1982–1986	88	12	0	0	45
528	John Bird	1982	6	1	0	0	3
529	Mark Cannon	1982–1985	19	3	5	0	19
530	Peter Thomas	1982	2	0	0	0	0
531	Billy Noke	1982–1987	67	6	12	0	48
532	Pat Fairhall	1982–1983	7	2	0	0	6
533	Colin Fraser	1982–1988	69	15	0	0	49
534	Steve Casey	1982–1983	14	2	13	0	33
535	Richard Jones	1982–1985	12	2	0	0	8
536	Gerry O'Neill	1982	2	0	0	0	0
537	Rick Powell	1982–1986	8	0	0	0	0
538	Steve Gearin	1983–1984	47	15	161	0	382
539	Graeme O'Grady	1983–1985	61	5	0	0	20
540	Steve Rogers	1983–1984	29	8	42	5	121
541	Craig Madsen	1983	10	0	0	0	0
542	Michael O'Connor	1983–1986	78	33	130	9	401
543	Glenn Burgess	1983–1987	61	10	0	0	40
544	Glenn Montgomery	1983	1	0	0	0	0
545	Jim Walsh	1983–1985	7	0	0	0	0
546	Martin Horwood	1983–1984	9	0	0	0	0
547	Chris Guider	1984–1986	37	3	0	0	12
548	Perry Haddock	1984–1986	58	12	0	1	49
549	Chris Johns	1984–1987	56	7	0	0	28
550	Paul Morris	1984–1985	18	1	0	0	4
551	John Fifita	1984–1990	76	5	0	0	20
552	Stephen Funnell	1984–1988	45	8	18	1	69
553	Greg Duval	1984	3	0	0	0	0
554	Steve Linnane	1985–1990	100	23	1	19	113
555	Phil Ritchie	1985–1986	19	0	0	0	0
556	Alan Neil	1985	3	0	0	0	0
557	George Moroko	1985	2	0	0	0	0
558	Ricky Walford	1985–1996	207	104	229	0	874
559	Tony Townsend	1985–1987	13	1	0	0	4
560	Richard Clarke	1985	1	0	0	0	0
561	Marc Glanville	1986–1987	8	0	0	0	0
562	Geoff Selby	1986–1988	44	4	0	0	16
563	Steve Robinson	1986–1990	62	7	0	0	28
564	Kevin Duckett	1986–1987	4	0	0	0	0
565	Paul Osborne	1986–1991	84	1	0	0	4
566	Stephen Jones	1986	1	0	0	0	0
567	Bronko Djura	1987	16	3	39	0	90
568	Wally Fullerton Smith	1987–1992	91	5	0	0	20
569	Bert Gordon	1987–1988	14	3	0	0	12
570	Billy Johnstone	1987	22	0	0	0	0
571	Mark Ko'cass	1987	16	2	0	1	9
572	Wilfred Williams	1987	17	2	0	0	8
573	Steven Thomas	1987–1988	8	1	0	0	4
574	Gavin Allen	1987	2	0	0	0	0
575	Greg Evans	1987	3	0	0	0	0
576	Brian Quinton	1987	4	0	0	0	0
577	Mark Blackburn	1987–1990	18	2	0	0	8
578	Peter Hall	1987	1	0	0	0	0
579	Shane Flanagan	1987	3	0	0	0	0
580	Seamus O'Connell	1987–1988	18	0	0	0	0
581	Brad Mackay	1987–1994	117	23	13	0	118
582	Peter Gentle	1987–1988	3	0	0	0	0
583	Trevor Bailey	1988–1990	66	12	0	0	48
584	Peter Gill	1988–1991	71	11	0	0	44
585	Clinton Mohr	1988–1989	39	14	0	0	56
586	Craig Borg	1988	1	0	0	0	0
587	Brett Clark	1988–1989	21	9	0	0	36
588	Trevor Crow	1988–1989	11	0	0	0	0
589	Jason Hoogerwerf	1988–1990	16	0	0	0	0
590	Garry Longhurst	1988–1989	12	0	0	0	0
591	David Roods	1988	1	0	0	0	0
592	Trevor Benson	1988	2	0	0	0	0
593	Shaun O'Bryan	1988	2	1	0	0	4
594	Darren Higgins	1988–1990	20	3	0	0	12
595	Richard Tuffy	1988	2	0	0	0	0
596	Paul Danes	1989–1991	5	0	0	0	0
597	Shane Kelly	1989–1990	24	0	0	0	0
598	Michael Potter	1989–1993	100	14	0	0	56
599	Paul Upfield	1989	5	0	0	0	0
600	Darren South	1989–1991	30	8	5	0	42
601	Peter Spring	1989–1991	24	0	0	0	0
602	Matthew Elliott	1989–1992	61	8	0	0	32
603	Mark Coyne	1989–1998	207	56	0	0	224
604	Chris Culbert	1989	2	0	0	0	0
605	Michael Culbert	1989–1990	3	2	0	0	8
606	David Niu	1990–1991	19	2	1	0	10
607	Neil Tierney	1990–1993	57	1	0	0	4
608	Paul Doolan	1990	6	1	0	0	4
609	Scott Gourley	1990–1996	128	29	0	0	116
610	Ron Williams	1990–1991	6	2	0	0	8
611	Tony Priddle	1990–1995	103	11	0	0	44
612	Rod Doyle	1990	7	1	12	0	28
613	Cameron Wade	1990–1992	19	5	0	0	20
614	Kurt Landers	1990–1991	7	2	0	0	8
615	Ian Herron	1990–1995	47	11	111	0	266
616	Shane Walker	1990–1992	3	1	0	0	4
617	Jason Alchin	1991	3	1	0	0	4
618	Wayne Collins	1991–1994	68	5	0	0	20
619	Sean Townsend	1991	3	0	0	0	0
620	Mark Ellison	1991	5	1	6	0	16
621	Rex Terp	1991–1994	36	14	0	0	56
622	Peter Coyne	1991–1992	34	0	13	2	28
623	Jeff Hardy	1991–1998	159	20	0	0	80
624	Troy Hodges	1991–1992	16	1	0	0	4
625	Martin Offiah	1991	14	11	0	0	44
626	Guy Picken	1991–1992	15	1	0	0	4
627	Sean McVean	1991–1994	22	0	0	0	0
628	David Barnhill	1992–1996	111	7	0	0	28
629	Jason Donnelly	1992–1996	55	16	0	0	64
630	Noel Goldthorpe	1992–1996	106	25	44	16	204
631	Tony Smith	1992–1995	48	4	0	0	16
632	Michael House	1992	1	0	0	0	0
633	Mark Lyons	1992	3	0	0	0	0
634	Dean Morris	1992	1	0	0	0	0
635	Andrew Walker	1992–1994	18	6	0	2	26
636	Jason Stevens	1992–1996	64	3	0	0	12
637	Matt Fuller	1992	3	0	0	0	0
638	Gorden Tallis	1992–1996	54	17	1	0	70
639	Graeme Bradley	1993–1995	70	13	0	0	52
640	Phil Blake	1993–1994	29	15	0	0	60
641	Nathan Brown	1993–1998	120	23	0	0	92
642	Damien Chapman	1993–1995	12	2	12	0	32
643	Scott Park	1993–1994	4	1	0	0	4
644	Richard Gay	1993	1	0	0	0	0
645	Andrew Sanderson	1993–1994	2	0	0	0	0
646	Jeff Wittenberg	1993	1	0	0	0	0
647	Anthony Mundine	1993–1996, 1998	83	37	3	2	156
648	Rod Maybon	1994–1995	35	9	0	0	36
649	Paul Stevens	1994	11	0	0	0	0
650	Nick Zisti	1994–1996	32	15	0	0	60
651	Luke Felsch	1994–1998	56	3	0	0	2
652	Scott Ingram	1994	2	0	0	0	0
653	Peter Phillips	1994	1	0	0	0	0
654	Troy Stone	1994–1996	36	2	0	0	8
655	John Deery	1994	3	0	0	0	0
656	Andrew Carige	1994	1	0	0	0	0
657	Paul Sanderson	1994	1	0	0	0	0
658	Wayne Bartrim	1995–1998	83	19	242	0	560
659	Mark Bell	1995–1997	52	24	9	1	115
660	Jeff Orford	1995	8	1	0	0	4
661	Anthony Kaberry	1995–1996	4	0	0	0	0
662	Chris Quinn	1995–1996	30	5	0	0	20
663	Damien McGarry	1995	13	1	0	0	4
664	Colin Saukuru	1995–1997	11	0	0	0	0
665	Alan Wilson	1995	2	0	0	0	0
666	Lance Thompson	1995–1998	69	4	9	0	34
667	Kurt Wrigley	1995	5	0	3	0	6
668	Brad Smith	1995–1998	27	2	0	0	8
669	Tony Grimaldi	1995	1	0	0	0	0
670	Damien Smith	1995–1997	28	3	0	0	12
671	Ben Kusto	1996–1998	22	2	3	0	14
672	Scott Murray	1996	1	0	0	0	0
673	Colin Ward	1996–1998	69	6	0	0	24
674	Adrian Brunker	1996–1998	52	25	0	0	100
675	Kevin Campion	1996	20	2	0	0	8
676	Jim Lenihan	1996–1998	40	9	0	0	36
677	Dean Raper	1996–1998	29	3	0	0	12
678	Nathan Blacklock	1997–1998	23	20	0	0	80
679	Tony Hearn	1997–1998	15	0	0	0	0
680	Shane Kenward	1997	13	1	0	0	4
681	Corey Pearson	1997–1998	46	4	0	0	16
682	Andrew Tangata-Toa	1997–1998	26	1	0	0	4
683	Darren Treacy	1997–1998	40	6	0	0	24
684	Gavin Clinch	1997	16	2	0	0	8
685	Daniel Wagon	1997–1998	28	11	0	0	44
686	Lee Murphy	1997–1998	34	13	13	0	78
687	Jamie Ainscough	1997–1998	37	8	0	2	34
688	Darren Rameka	1997	6	1	0	0	4
689	Steve Price	1997	9	1	4	0	12
690	Robert Henare	1997–1998	3	0	0	0	0
691	Troy Perkins	1997	1	0	0	0	0
692	Matthew Rodwell	1998	25	6	0	0	24
693	Robbie Simpson	1998	14	0	0	0	0
694	Willie Poching	1998	4	1	0	0	4
695	Craig Stapleton	1998	6	1	0	0	4
696	Joel Caine	1998	3	0	0	0	0
