= Sid (given name) =

Sid is a nickname deriving from (and hypocorism for) the given name Sidney, Siddhartha, Sidonia, Siddiq or Sidra, though it is also used by people with other given names.

== Notable people ==
=== A ===
- Sid Abel (1918–2000), Canadian Hall of Fame hockey player, coach and general manager in the National Hockey League
- Sid Abramowitz (born 1960), former American football player
- Sid Akins (born 1962), American former professional baseball pitcher
- Sid Ahmed Aouadj (born 1991), Algerian footballer
- Sid Applebaum (1924–2016), American businessman, co-founder of Rainbow Foods
- Sid Armour, Canadian make-up artist
- Sid Atkinson (1901–1977), South African athlete
- Sid C. Attard (born 1950), Maltese-born Canadian thoroughbred horse racing trainer
- Sid Avery (1918–2002), American photographer and director

=== B ===
- Sid Barnes (1916–1973), Australian cricketer and cricket writer
- Sid Barras (born 1948), English former professional road racing cyclist
- Sid Barron (1917–2006), Canadian editorial cartoonist and artist
- Sid Bass (1913–1993), American songwriter and orchestra leader
- Sid Bass (born 1942), American billionaire investor and philanthropist
- Sid Bedford (1897–1958), English professional footballer
- Sid Ahmed Belkedrouci (1950–2024), Algerian football manager and former player
- Sid Bennett (1895–1971), American football player
- Sid Bennett (director), British film and television director, producer, and writer
- Sid Benton (1894–1977), Major League Baseball pitcher
- Sid Bernstein (impresario) (1918–2013), American music producer and promoter
- Sid Bernstein (editor) (1907–1993), American publisher
- Sid Beton (1895–1972), English cricketer
- Sid Bevan (1877–1933), Welsh rugby union player
- Sid Bidewell (1918–2003), English professional footballer and manager
- Sid Binks (1899–1978), English footballer
- Sid Bishop (footballer, born 1900) (1900–1949), English footballer
- Sid Bishop (footballer, born 1934) (1934–2020), English footballer
- Sid Blackhall (born 1945), English former professional footballer
- Sid Blackie (1899–1966), English footballer and rugby player
- Sid Blanks (1942–2021), American professional football player
- Sid Bobb (born 1980), Canadian actor and television presenter
- Sid Borgia (1917–1999), American professional basketball referee
- Sid Ali Boudina (born 1990), Algerian rower
- Sid Bowser (1891–1961), English footballer
- Sid Boyling (1914–2006), Canadian broadcaster
- Sid Boyum (1914–1991), American industrial photographer, sculptor and graphic artist
- Sid Bradley (born 1936), British academic, author and specialist
- Sid Bream (born 1960), American baseball player
- Sid Brews (1899–1972), South African golfer
- Sid Brod (1899–1955), American assistant director, producer and screenwriter
- Sid Brooks (1935–2007), American equipment manager
- Sid Burgon (born 1936), British comics artist
- Sid Burrows (born 1964), Northern Irish retired footballer
- Sid Burston (born 1959), American actor

=== C ===
- Sid Caesar (1922–2014), American actor and comedian
- Sid Cann (1911–1996), English footballer
- Sid Carroll (cricketer) (1922–1984), Australian cricketer
- Sid Carroll (American football) (1915–1995), American football executive
- Sid Castle (1892–1978), English professional footballer
- Sid Catlett (1910–1951), American jazz drummer
- Sid Catlett (1948–2017), American basketball player, son of above
- Sid Catlin (born 1949), former Australian rules footballer
- Sid Cavendish (1876–1954), English professional footballer
- Sid Chandler (1901–1961), English footballer
- Sid Chaplin (1916–1986), English writer
- Sid Check (1930–2002), American comic book artist
- Sid Clewlow (1919–1989), English footballer
- Sid Colin (1915–1989), English scriptwriter
- Sid Collins (broadcaster) (1922–1977), American sportscaster
- Sid Collins Jr. (1912–1983), English golfer
- Sid Conlon (1898–1950), Australian rules footballer
- Sid Conrad (1923–2010), American television character actor
- Sid Corfield (1883–1941), English footballer
- Sid Couchey (1919–2012), American comic book artist
- Sid Cramp, Australian politician
- Sid Crowl (1888–1971), English professional footballer

=== D ===
- Sid Davidoff (1939–2025), American lawyer
- Sid Davis (1916–2006), American director and producer
- Sid Deane (1885–1967), foundation Australian rugby league player
- Sid Diamond (born 1986), New Zealand rapper
- Sid Dickens (born 1963), Canadian artist
- Sid Dinsdale (born 1952), American banker
- Sid Dockendorff (1908–2005), Australian rules footballer
- Sid Domic (born 1975), Australian former professional rugby league footballer
- Sid Draper (born 2006), Australian rules footballer
- Sid Dutchak (born 1950), Canadian lawyer, consultant and former political figure

=== E ===
- Sid Edwards (born 1963), American politician and football coach
- Sid Elliott (1915–1986), Australian rugby league footballer
- Sid Emery (1885–1967), Australian cricketer
- Sid Espinosa (born 1972), American businessman and politician
- Sid Eudy (1960–2024), American retired professional wrestler known as "Sycho" Sid Vicious/Justice

=== F ===
- Sid Farrar (1859–1935), American professional baseball infielder
- Sid Feller (1916–2006), American conductor and arranger
- Sid Fernandez (born 1962), American former professional baseball left-handed pitcher
- Sid Ferris (1908–1993), English long-distance cyclist
- Sid Ahmed Ferroukhi (1967–2022), Algerian politician
- Sid Field (1904–1950), English comedy entertainer
- Sid Field (rugby league), Australian rugby league footballer
- Sid Finney (1929–2009), Northern Irish-born Canadian professional ice hockey centre
- Sid Flanagan (1909–1990), American politician
- Sid Fleischman (1920–2010), American author
- Sid Fournet (1932–2011), American collegiate and professional American football player
- Sid French (1920–1979), British communist activist and organiser
- Sid Freudenstein (born 1945), American gymnast

=== G ===
- Sid Ganis (born 1940), American motion picture executive and producer
- Sid Gautreaux (1912–1980), Major League Baseball pitcher
- Sid Gepford (1895–1924), American football player
- Sid Ahmed Ghozali (1937–2025), Algerian politician, Prime Minister of Algeria from 1991 to 1992
- Sid Gillman (1911–2003), American football player and coach
- Sid Gilman (born 1932), American neurologist
- Sid Going (1943–2024), New Zealand former rugby union footballer
- Sid Goodwin (1914–1980), Australian rugby league footballer
- Sid Gordon (1917–1975), American baseball player
- Sid Grauman (1879–1950), American theatre impresario
- Sid Graves (1901–1983), Major League Baseball outfielder
- Sid Gray (born 1942), English professor
- Sid Greene (1906–1972), American comic book artist
- Sid Griffin (born 1955), American-born British singer, songwriter, guitarist-mandolinist, bandleader, and author
- Sid Griffiths, Welsh wrestler
- Sid Grossman (1913–1955), American photographer, teacher, and social activist
- Sid Gueran (1916–1944), English footballer

=== H ===
- Sid Hadden (1877–1934), English cricketer
- Sid Haig (1939–2019), American actor
- Sid Handleman (1921–1988), Canadian politician
- Sid J. Hare (1860–1938), American landscape architect
- Sid Harkreader (1898–1988), American old-time fiddle player and string band leader
- Sid Harle, American judge and Republican politician
- Sid Harris (1906–1965), Australian rugby league footballer
- Sid Harrold (born 1895), English footballer
- Sid Hartman (1920–2020), American sports journalist
- Sid Harvey, Australian rugby union player
- Sid Hatfield (1893–1921), American police Chief, mining union activist
- Sid Hawley (1909–1971), English professional footballer
- Sid Hearn (1899–1963), English first-class cricketer
- Sid G. Hedges (1897–1974), British writer
- Sid Helliwell (1904–1939), English professional footballer
- Sid Hemphill (1876–1963), American blues multi-instrumentalist and bandleader
- Sid Hird (1910–1980), Australian cricketer
- Sid Hoad (1890–1973), English professional footballer
- Sid Hobson (born 1917), Australian former professional rugby league footballer
- Sid Hood (1933–2006), English professional snooker player
- Sid Hudson (1915–2008), starting pitcher in Major League Baseball
- Sid Hurst (1918–2016), New Zealand farmer

=== I ===
- Sid Ahmed Inal (1931–1956), Algerian Martyr
- Sid Ireland (1886–1964), English professional footballer

=== J ===
- Sid Jacobson (1929–2022), American writer
- Sid James (1913–1976), South African-born English film and television actor
- Sid Jamieson, American former lacrosse coach
- Sid Jarvis (1905–1994), English footballer
- Sid Jelinek (1899–1979), American architect
- Sid Jensen (born 1947), Canadian gymnast
- Sid Jerram (1891–1959), Welsh rugby union and professional rugby league footballer
- Sid Jones (1921–1977), English footballer
- Sid Jordan (1889–1970), American film actor
- Sid Jordan (1877–1971), Australian broadcaster
- Sid Judd (1928–1959), Welsh international rugby union flanker
- Sid Justin (born 1954), American former gridiron football defensive back, singer and songwriter

=== K ===
- Sid Kaufman (1891–1971), Australian rugby league footballer
- Sid Michaels Kavulich (1956–2018), American politician, radio, and television broadcaster
- Sid Kean, New Zealand international rugby league footballer
- Sid Ahmed Khedis (born 1985), Algerian footballer
- Sid Kiel (1916–2007), South African doctor
- Sid Kimpton (1887–1968), English football player
- Sid Ali Kouiret (1933–2015), Algerian actor
- Sid Kuller (1910–1993), American comedy writer, producer and lyricist/composer

=== L ===
- Sid Ali Lakroum (born 1987), Algerian international footballer
- Sid Ali Lamri (born 1991), Algerian footballer
- Sid Laverents (1908–2009), American amateur filmmaker
- Sid Lawrence (born 1909), Welsh footballer
- Sid Ali Lazazi (1957–2025), Algerian footballer
- Sid LeProtti (1886–1958), American pianist and bandleader
- Sid Lerner (1930–2021), American advertising and marketing industry executive and public health advocate
- Sid Levine (1918–1999), American professional basketball player
- Sid Lewis (born 1964), former American football defensive back
- Sid Little (1930–2017), English rugby union and professional rugby league footballer
- Sid Loudoun (1912–1973), Australian rugby league footballer
- Sid Lovett (1928–2021), American politician
- Sid Lowe (born 1976), English columnist and journalist
- Sid Lucero (born 1983), Filipino television and film actor and model
- Sid Luckman (1916–1998), American football player

=== M ===
- Sid Makkar, Indian actor
- Sid Mallya (born 1987), Indian and American actor and model
- Sid Mannix (1910–1986), Australian rugby league footballer
- Sid Marcus (1904–1985), American animator and director
- Sid Mark (1933–2022), American radio disc jockey
- Sid Marty (born 1944), Canadian writer
- Sid Mashburn, American fashion designer
- Sid Ali Mazif (1943–2023), Algerian film director
- Sid Ahmed Rafik Mazouzi (born 1989), Algerian footballer
- Sid McClellan (1925–2000), English professional footballer
- Sid McCray (1957–2020), American punk singer
- Sid McGinnis (born 1949), American musician and guitarist
- Sid McMath (1912–2003), 34th Governor of Arkansas
- Sid McNabney (1929–1957), Canadian professional ice hockey centre
- Sid Meehl (1914–1986), Australian rules footballer
- Sid Meier (born 1954), Canadian-born Swiss-American game developer, famous for his Civilization series
- Sid Melton (1917–2011), American actor
- Sid Mercer (1880–1945), American sports writer
- Sid Miller (born 1955), American politician
- Sid Millward (1909–1972), British musician
- Sid Mittra (1930–2022), Indian-American economist and academic
- Sid Moffat (1910–1981), English professional footballer
- Sid Mohn, American clergyman for the United Church of Christ
- Sid Monge (born 1951), Mexican former Major League Baseball relief pitcher
- Sid Morrison (born 1933–2026), American farmer and politician

=== N ===
- Sid Neigum (born 1988), Canadian fashion designer
- Sid Nelson (born 1996), English professional footballer
- Sid Nichols (1895–1971), American football player and coach

=== O ===
- Sid O'Flaherty (1886–1967), Australian politician
- Sid O'Linn (1927–2016), South African sportsman
- Sid O'Neill (1888–1915), Australian rules footballer
- Sid Ottewell (1919–2012), English professional footballer
- Sid Ahmed Ould Bneijara (1947–2017), 4th Prime Minister of Mauritania
- Sid Owen (born 1972), English actor, television presenter and former singer

=== P ===
- Sid Page (born 1947), American violinist
- Sid Parker (born 1930), Canadian politician
- Sid Parnes (1922–2013), American academic
- Sid Patterson (1927–1999), Australian racing cyclist
- Sid Pegler (1888–1972), South African cricketer
- Sid Penny (1875–1965), English rugby union hooker
- Sid Perou (1937–2024), British cinematographer and film director
- Sid Pert (1890–1966), pioneer Australian rugby league footballer
- Sid Pert Jr. (born 1933), Australian rugby league footballer
- Sid Peterson (1918–2001), Major League Baseball pitcher
- Sid Phillips (musician) (1907–1973), British jazz musician
- Sid Plunkett (1920–1986), English footballer
- Sid Prest (1943–2015), Canadian politician
- Sid Prior (born 1943), Australian former boxer
- Sid Pugh (1919–1944), English professional footballer
- Sid Purkis (1938–2008), English athlete

=== R ===
- Sid Rainey (born 1968), Irish musician and television producer
- Sid Ramin (1919–2019), American orchestrator, arranger, and composer
- Sid Ramnarace (born 1973), Canadian-born American designer and strategist
- Sid Rawle (1945–2010), British campaigner
- Sid Rawlings (1913–1956), English professional footballer
- Sid Raymond (1909–2006), American comedian and character actor
- Sid Reeves (1891–1962), Australian rules footballer
- Sid Ahmed Rezala (1979–2000), Algerian-born French serial killer, dubbed "The Killer of the Trains"
- Sid W. Richardson (1891–1959), American businessman and philanthropist
- Sid Riley (1878–1964), New Zealand rugby union player who represented Australia
- Sid Ringsby (born 1961), Norwegian bassist
- Sid Rix (born 1898), GB & England international rugby league footballer
- Sid Roberson (baseball) (born 1971), American baseball player
- Sid Robinson (athlete) (1902–1982), American middle-distance runner
- Sid Robinson (soccer), Australian soccer player
- Sid Rogell (1900–1973), American film producer
- Sid Rosenbaum (born 1967), American politician
- Sid Rosenberg (born 1967), American radio personality
- Sid Russell (1937–1994), English cricketer and footballer
- Sid Ryan (born 1952), Canadian labour union leader and politician
- Sid Ryan (1921–2011), Australian professional rugby league footballer

=== S ===
- Sid Saab (born 1971), American politician
- Sid Sackson (1920–2002), American board game designer and collector
- Sid Scales (1916–2003), New Zealand cartoonist
- Sid Schacht (1918–1991), American professional baseball player
- Sid Scholey (1885–1934), English football manager
- Sid Scott (1900–1970), New Zealand communist, journalist and editor
- Sid Searl (1917–2000), Australian rules footballer
- Sid Seixeiro (born 1977), Canadian television broadcaster
- Sid Sidebottom (born 1951), Australian former politician
- Sid Silk (1921–2004), Australian rules footballer
- Sid Silvers (1901–1976), American actor, comedian, lyricist, and writer
- Sid Simpson (1894–1958), American politician
- Sid Smart (1888–1969), England international rugby union player
- Sid Smith (ice hockey) (1925–2004), Canadian ice hockey player
- Sid Smith (offensive lineman) (born 1948), American football player
- Sid Smith (politician) (1893–1981), New Zealand politician
- Sid Smith (footballer, born 1928) (1928–1985), Australian rules footballer
- Sid Smith (boxer) (1889–1948), English boxer
- Sid Smith (lacrosse) (born 1986), Iroquois lacrosse player
- Sid Smith (American football coach) (1912–2006), American football coach
- Sid Smith (novelist) (born 1949), English novelist and journalist
- Sid Smith (actor) (1894–1928), American actor and filmmaker
- Sid Smith (music writer) (born 1957), British musician
- Sid Smith (footballer, born 1890) (1890–1952), Australian rules footballer
- Sid Snyder (1926–2012), American businessman and politician
- Sid Spindler (1932–2008), Australian politician
- Sid Sriram (born 1990), Indian-American Carnatic musician
- Sid Stanton (1923–2005), English professional footballer
- Sid Storey (1919–2010), English professional footballer
- Sid Sutherland (1901–1968), American animator, screenwriter, and sound editor
- Sid Sutton (1939–2023), British graphic designer

=== T ===
- Sid Taberlay (born 1980), Australian professional mountain biker
- Sid Tanenbaum (1925–1986), American basketball player
- Sid Tepper (1918–2015), American songwriter
- Sid Terris ("Ghost of the Ghetto", 1904–1974), American lightweight boxer
- Sid Thompson (1905–1975), Australian rules footballer
- Sid Tickridge (1923–1997), English professional footballer
- Sid Tinsley (1920–2006), American football punter
- Sid Tomack (1907–1962), American actor

=== V ===
- Sid van Druenen (born 1983), Dutch football coach and former semi-professional player
- Sid Varney (1927–2011), American football coach
- Sid Vicious (1957–1979), English punk rock musician, once a member of the Sex Pistols
- Sid Vincent (1921–1992), British trade union leader

=== W ===
- Sid Waddell (1940–2012), English sports commentator and television personality
- Sid Wagner (1912–1972), American college and professional football player
- Sid Wallace (born 1957), English former footballer
- Sid Wallington (1908–1989), English professional footballer
- Sid Watkins (1928–2012), English neurosurgeon
- Sid Watson (1932–2004), American football player and college ice hockey coach
- Sid Watson (1927–2021), English footballer
- Sid Wayne (1923–1991), American songwriter, lyricist and composer
- Sid Webb (1884–1956), English professional footballer
- Sid Weiss (1914–1994), American jazz double-bassist
- Sid Wharton (1875–1951), English professional footballer
- Sid White (1899–1968), English professional footballer
- Sid Wileman (1910–1985), English footballer
- Sid Williams (born 1942), American football player and diplomat
- Sid Williams (footballer) (1919–2003), English footballer
- Sid Williams (rugby league) (born 1944), Australian rugby league footballer
- Sid E. Williams (1928–2012), Founder of Life University
- Sid Wilson (born 1977), turntablist for the musical group Slipknot
- Sid Womack (1896–1958), American professional baseball player
- Sid Wood (footballer), English footballer
- Sid Wyche (1922–1983), American songwriter and pianist
- Sid Wyman (1910–1978), American poker player

=== Y ===
- Sid Ali Yahia-Chérif (born 1985), Algerian football player
- Sid Youngelman (1931–1991), American football offensive lineman in the National Football League
- Sid Yudain (1923–2013), American journalist

=== Z ===
- Sid Ahmed Zerrouki (born 1970), Algerian former international football midfielder

== Fictional characters ==
- Sid, or Cid, in the Final Fantasy series
- Sid, in the Ice Age film franchise
- Sid (The Dumping Ground)
- Sid (Devil May Cry), in Devil May Cry: The Animated Series
- Sid Arkale, from the anime Bakugan: Gundalian Invaders
- Sid Dabster, in the web comic User Friendly
- Sid Jenkins, in the British series Skins, played by Mike Bailey
- Sid Phillips, in the 1995 3D computer-animated film Toy Story
- Lock Dealer Sid, a New Generation Rider of Kamen Rider Gaim
- Sid the Dummy, in Buffy the Vampire Slayer
- Sid the Science Kid, in the eponymous children's show
- Sid the Sexist, in the comic book Viz
- Sid the Squid, in the Animaniacs episode Hurray for Slappy

== See also ==
- Sid (disambiguation)
- Syd (disambiguation)
