= Boyling =

Boyling is a surname. Notable people with the surname include:

- Christian Boyling, 17th-century scientific instrument maker
- Mark Boyling (born 1952), British Anglican dean
- Sid Boyling (1914–2006), Canadian broadcaster
