= Thomas Peters (disambiguation) =

Thomas Peters (1738–1792) was one of the leaders of the African Americans brought to Nova Scotia after the American Revolutionary War.

Thomas or Tom Peters may also refer to:

- Thomas Peters (1745–1857), Dutchman and earliest verifiable supercentenarian
- Thomas Minott Peters (1810–1888), American lawyer, Alabama Chief Justice, and botanist
- Tom Peters (rugby league) (1895–1960), Australian rugby league player
- Tom Peters (footballer) (1920–2010), English footballer
- Tom Peters (born 1942), American writer on business management practices
- Thomas Peters (born 1958), civil name of the German musician Tommi Stumpff
- Tom Peters, title character of the 2004 animated TV series Tom Goes to the Mayor

== See also ==
- Tom Petters (born 1957), CEO of Petters Group Worldwide
