= Dadswell =

Dadswell is an English surname. Notable people with the surname include:

- Doug Dadswell (born 1964), Canadian ice hockey player
- Hilton Dadswell (1903–1952), Australian rugby league footballer
- Lyndon Dadswell (1908–1986), Australian sculptor and war artist
- Shane Dadswell (born 1997), South African cricketer
