= Richard O'Connor (disambiguation) =

Richard O'Connor (1889–1981) was a British Army officer.

Richard O'Connor may also refer to:

- Richard Alphonsus O'Connor (1838–1913), Canadian priest
- Sixtus O'Connor (Richard James O'Connor) (1909–1983), American priest
- Richard Edward O'Connor (1851–1912), Australian politician and judge
- Richard Alfred O'Connor (1880–1941), South Australian politician
- Dick O'Connor (rugby league) (1916–1958), Australian rugby league footballer
- Richard O'Connor (1978–present), English-born Anguillan former soccer player

== See also ==
- Richard Conner (1934–2019), American diver
