= Mark Blackburn =

Mark Blackburn may refer to:

- Mark Blackburn (numismatist) (1953–2011)
- Mark Blackburn (rugby league), active 1987–1990
