= Sibraa =

Sibraa is a surname. Notable people with the surname include:

- Jim Sibraa (1896–1982), Australian rugby league player
- Kerry Sibraa (born 1937), Australian politician
