= William Sadlier =

William Sadlier may refer to:

- William Sadlier (bishop), Anglican bishop of Nelson
- William H. Sadlier, American family-owned publishing company
- Bill Sadlier, Australian rugby league player

== See also ==
- William Sadler (disambiguation)
