= Sid Carroll =

Sid Carroll may refer to:

- Sid Carroll (American football) (1915–1995), American sports executive and newspaper editor
- Sid Carroll (cricketer) (1922–1984), Australian cricketer
- Sidney Carroll (1913–1988), American screenwriter
