= Bert Gordon =

Bert Gordon may refer to:

- Bert Gordon (comedian) (1895–1974), American comedian and voice actor
- Bert I. Gordon (1922–2023), American film director
- Bert Gordon (rugby league), Australian rugby league player
