= Albert Harry =

Australian rugby league footballer and administrator

Personal information
- Full name: Albert Edwin Harry
- Born: 1903; Paddington, England
- Died: 7 April 1981; Waihi, New Zealand

Playing information
- Position: Halfback
Club
Years	Team	Pld	T	G	FG	P
1926	St. George	3	1	0	0	3

Albert Edwin Harry (1903–1981) was an Australian rugby league footballer who played in the 1920s.

Harry lived in Hurstville, New South Wales and played half-back in the lower grades for St. George in the mid 1920s.

He played first grade three times in 1926 replacing an injured Phil McSorley. He was still playing reserve grade at the conclusion of the 1927 season. Albert Harry and his family emigrated to New Zealand in the late 1930s.

Harry died at Waiha, New Zealand on 7 April 1981, aged 78 and is buried at Whangamata Cemetery.
