= James Dwyer =

James Dwyer may refer to:

- James Francis Dwyer (1874–1952), Australian writer
- James Dwyer (politician) (1881–1932), Irish Cumann na nGaedhael politician
- Pat Dwyer (American football) or James K. Dwyer (1884–1939), American football coach
- Jim Dwyer (rugby league) (1902–1983), Australian rugby league player
- James J. Dwyer (fl. 1957–2019), American politician in the Massachusetts House of Representatives
- Jim Dwyer (baseball) (born 1950), Major League Baseball player
- Jim Dwyer (journalist) (1957–2020), New York Times journalist
- Jamie Dwyer (born 1979), Australian field hockey player

== See also ==
- Séamus Dwyer (1886–1922), Irish Sinn Féin politician
