= Sidra =

Sidra may refer to:

- Sidra (name)

== Places ==
- Gulf of Sidra, a body of water in the Mediterranean Sea on the northern coast of Libya
- Sidra, Libya, a Libyan port
- Sidra, Sokółka County, a village in Poland
- Gmina Sidra, a Polish administrative district
- Rio Sidra, a town in Kuna Yala territory, Panama
- Sidra (river), Poland

== Food and beverages ==
- The Spanish, Catalan, and Portuguese word for cider
- Apple Sidra, a Taiwanese cola
- Cucurbita ficifolia, a type of squash grown for its edible seeds, fruit, and greens

== Judaism ==
- The Weekly Torah portion in Judaism
- A variation on Seder, a subdivision of the biblical books in the masoretic text

== Other ==
- Sidra Intersection, software package for traffic design

== See also ==
- Sidrat al-Muntaha
