= Harold Hadley =

Harold Hadley may refer to:

- Harry Hadley (1877–1942), English footballer and football manager
- Harold Hadley (rugby league) (1895–1977), Australian rugby league footballer for the St. George Dragons
