= Ken Kearney (rugby league, born 1958) =

Australian rugby league footballer (born 1958)

Personal information
- Full name: Kenneth James Kearney
- Born: 1958 (age 67–68) Sydney

Playing information
- Position: Halfback, Five-eighth
Club
Years	Team	Pld	T	G	FG	P
1978–79	St. George Dragons	29	6	19	1	57
- Source: Whiticker/Hudson

Ken Kearney was an Australian rugby league footballer who played in the 1970s.

Kearney was graded as a fleet-footed lower grade half-back in the late 70s. Ken came into first grade to replace Mark Shulman in 1978, who suffered a back injury towards the end the 1977 season. Kearney played for most of the 1978 season initially at half, although when Mark Shulman became available to return to first grade for six games, Ken Kearney then replaced Rod McGregor at Five-eighth for the remaining games.

In 1979, Kearney played in 6 games as a replacement for the new Half-back Steve Morris. He was also used as a Centre replacement for two games due injuries sustained by Robert Finch and Graham Quinn. Ken Kearney retired in the lower grades at the conclusion of the 1980 season and played out his career in Brisbane.
