= Jack Finnie =

Australian rugby league footballer

Personal information
- Full name: John William Finnie
- Born: 1927
- Died: 9 August 1994 (aged 66–67) Marrickville, New South Wales

Playing information
- Position: Wing
Club
Years	Team	Pld	T	G	FG	P
1948	St. George	10	5	0	0	15

John William 'Jack' Finnie (1927-1994) was an Australian rugby league footballer who played in the 1940s.

Finnie was the son of the former 'hard punching' southpaw boxer and sometimes stand-over man John Joseph 'Jack' Finnie (1902-1968). Jack Finnie joined the St. George Dragons in 1947. He was a fast winger that played 10 first grade games in 1948.

His career was cut short in a violent game against Eastern Suburbs at Hurstville Oval on 24 July 1948 that almost turned into a riot. East's forward Sid Hobson, kicked Finnie in the head and face and Finnie collapsed on the ground unconscious. The Dragons Ball Boy Warren Saunders was so incensed after seeing the ugly incident, he threw the ball at Sid Hobson, hitting him between the shoulder blades. Finnie did not play rugby league again after his severe injuries.

Finnie died on 9 August 1994 at Marrickville, New South Wales. He is buried with his father and mother at Woronora Catholic Cemetery, Sutherland, New South Wales.
