= Allan Boler =

Australian rugby league footballer

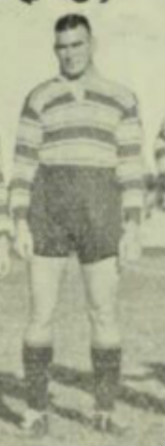
- Allan Bolar, St.George.1939

Personal information
- Full name: Allan Ernest Boler
- Born: 1912 Armidale, New South Wales, Australia
- Died: 31 August 1978 (aged 66) Hurstville, New South Wales, Australia

Playing information
- Position: Prop
Club
Years	Team	Pld	T	G	FG	P
1939–40	St. George	21	3	12	0	33

Allan Boler (1912–1978) was an Australian rugby league footballer who played in the 1930s and 1940s.

A rampaging front rower from Armidale, New South Wales. Boler came to the St. George club at the start of World War II in 1939. Hailing from a pioneer rugby league family from the New England region, Boler had represented North West N.S.W, in 1929 as a 17-year-old. His time at St. George was cut short in 1940 after suffering a badly broken collarbone. His place in the team was taken by Lindsay Spencer in 1941.

Boler retired at the conclusion of the 1940 season. His place in the team was taken by Lindsay Spencer in 1941.

Boler died on 31 July 1978, at Hurstville, New South Wales, aged 66
