= Pat Quinn (Australian rugby league) =

Australian rugby league footballer

Personal information
- Full name: Patrick Quinn
- Died: 1994

Playing information
- Position: Fullback, Wing
Club
Years	Team	Pld	T	G	FG	P
1944–45	St. George	16	7	0	0	21
1947–48	Eastern Suburbs	10	8	0	0	24
	Total	26	15	0	0	45

Pat Quinn was an Australian former professional rugby league footballer who played in the 1940s. He played at club level for St. George and Eastern Suburbs, as a fullback or wing.

== Playing career ==
Pat Quinn was a St. George Dragons junior, during the war years. His position was usually fullback, although he often played wing when Ted McHugh was in the side. After two years at the Dragons, during the last years of the War, Quinn moved to the Eastern Suburbs club in 1947 but played mostly in Reserve Grade, and often on the wing.
