= Allen Kerr (politician) =

American politician

Member of the Arkansas House of Representatives from the 32nd district
- In office January 2009 – January 2015
- Preceded by: Sid Rosenbaum
- Succeeded by: Jim Sorvillo

Personal details
- Born: Allen Wade Kerr; November 19, 1956 (age 69) Little Rock, Arkansas, U.S.
- Party: Republican

Allen Wade Kerr (born November 19, 1956) is an American politician. He served as a Republican member for the 32nd district of the Arkansas House of Representatives.

Kerr was born in Little Rock, Arkansas. He established the Allen Kerr Insurance Company in 1981. In 2013, the company was bought by Simmons Bank, with Kerr continuing as president. In 2009, he was elected for the 32nd district of the Arkansas House of Representatives. Kerr succeeded Sid Rosenbaum. In 2015, he was succeeded by Jim Sorvillo for the 32nd district. Kerr was Arkansas Commissioner of Insurance from 2015 to 2020, when he resigned to work in the private sector.
