= Bert Delavere =

Australian rugby league footballer

Personal information
- Full name: Albert Henry Delavere
- Born: 22 May 1916 Forest Lodge, New South Wales, Australia
- Died: 1988 (aged 71–72) Western Australia, Australia

Playing information
- Position: Wing
Club
Years	Team	Pld	T	G	FG	P
1936	St. George Dragons	1	1	1	0	5
- Source: Whiticker/Hudson

Albert Henry Delavere (1916-1988) was an Australian rugby league footballer who played in the 1930s.

Delavere played one first-grade match for the St. George Dragons in 1936. In 1937, he transferred clubs to Wollongong.

Delavere was elected as President of the Illawarra Rugby League in 1952. He served for two years and did not stand for re-election in 1954.
