= Waiha =

Rajput tribe

Waiha Veha
- Rajput tribe
- Ethnicity: Rajput
- Location: Punjab, Pakistan
- Origin: Jaisalmer
- Demonym: Waiha
- Language: Seraiki

The Waiha, sometimes pronounced Veha, are a Seraiki-speaking Rajput tribe, found in the province of Punjab. They trace their origin to Jaisalmer and according to tribal traditions that in the 4th century of the Hijra (913 CE – 1009 CE) the Raja of that State gave Rurar, the modern Tajgarh, in dower to his daughter Huran, and that the place was named after her.
