= Leo Hurley =

Australian rugby league footballer and coach

Personal information
- Full name: Leo Milton Hurley
- Born: 1930
- Died: 24 November 1995 (aged 64–65); Primbee, New South Wales, Australia

Playing information
- Position: Hooker
Club
Years	Team	Pld	T	G	FG	P
1952	St. George Dragons	8	1	0	0	3
- Source: Whiticker/Hudson

Leo Hurley (1930-1995) was an Australian professional rugby league footballer who played in the 1950s.

Originally from the Port Kembla club in the Group 7 competition, Leo Hurley and fellow Port Kembla team-mate Allan Staunton joined the St. George Dragons in 1952. Leo Hurley's career at the Dragons was basically as the back-up hooker to cover for Ken Kearney, who was the first grade hooker during this period. This limited Hurley's appearances for the club, and he played most of his career at the Dragon's in reserve grade. Hurley's only semi-final appearances was on 6 September 1952, deputizing for Ken Kearney who was on the 1952/53 Kangaroo Tour. He returned to Wollongong to captain/coach the Corrimal rugby league club the following season.

Leo Hurley died on 24 November 1995.
