= Brad Wilson (rugby league) =

Australian rugby league footballer (1959–2022)

Personal information
- Full name: Bradley Mark Wilson
- Born: 11 June 1959
- Died: 7 April 2022 (aged 62)

Playing information
- Position: Wing
Club
Years	Team	Pld	T	G	FG	P
1981–82	St. George Dragons	9	5	24	0	63

Bradley Mark Wilson (11 June 1959 – 7 April 2022) was an Australian rugby league footballer.

Recruited locally, Wilson played in the lower grades for the St. George Dragons primarily as a fullback, but was utilised on a wing during his time in first–grade. He contributed two tries and three goals on his first–grade debut against Canterbury at Kogarah in 1981. His first–grade appearances were limited to nine matches.

Wilson was a younger brother of Newtown and Penrith player Ken Wilson.
