= Allan Ling =

Australian rugby league footballer and administrator

Personal information
- Full name: Allan Ling
- Born: 1919; Kempsey, New South Wales
- Died: 24 August 2006 (age 87); Soldiers Point, New South Wales

Playing information
- Position: Centre
Club
Years	Team	Pld	T	G	FG	P
1946	St. George	2	1	0	0	3

Allan Ling (1919-2006) was an Australian rugby league footballer who played in the 1940s.

Allan 'Snowy' Ling came from the Newcastle Rugby League competition to the St. George Dragons for one season in 1946.

During that year he played a couple of first grade games, but ultimately couldn't cement permanent first grade spot.

Ling died on 24 August 2006 at Soldiers Point, New South Wales aged 87.
