= Harry Flower =

Australian rugby league footballer

Personal information
- Full name: Harold Edwin Flower
- Born: 30 October 1900 Sydney, New South Wales, Australia
- Died: 6 September 1970 (aged 69) Beverly Hills, New South Wales, Australia

Playing information
- Position: Lock, Second-row, Prop
Club
Years	Team	Pld	T	G	FG	P
1922–30	St. George	58	6	0	0	18
Representative
Years	Team	Pld	T	G	FG	P
1924	New South Wales	1	0	0	0	0
1923	Metropolis	1	0	0	0	0
- Relatives: Jim Flower (brother)
- Military career
- Allegiance: Australia
- Branch: Australian Army
- Service years: 1940-1945
- Rank: Lance corporal
- Unit: Second Australian Imperial Force
- Conflicts: World War II

Harold Edwin 'Harry' Flower (30 October 1900 − 6 September 1970) was an Australian World War II veteran, a prisoner of war and a 1920s rugby league player in the New South Wales premiership competition with St. George.

Flower 2nd back row, 3rd from left in Saints' 1930 side

== Background ==
Flower was born in Newtown, New South Wales on 30 October 1900.

== Playing career ==
Flower learnt to play rugby league at a young age and was also a great runner, running marathons with the Redfern and St. George Harriers clubs. Originally a South Sydney junior and prop-forward, Flower played eight seasons with St. George during their foundation years between 1922 and 1930.

He scored a try in the infamous Earl Park Riot match in 1928. His last game was the 1930 Grand Final against Western Suburbs.

His brother Jim Flower also played with the St. George Dragons.

== War service ==
Flower enlisted in the Australian Army as a 40-year-old during World War II and attained the rank of lance corporal. He was captured and held by the Japanese as a prisoner of war, and survived. His 19-year-old son (Harry Edwin Flower junior) also served in the Australian Army and survived the war.

== Death ==
Flower died on 6 September 1970, 54 days short of his 70th birthday.
