= Lance Fitzgerald =

Australian rugby league footballer (1924–2008)

Personal information
- Full name: Lancelot John Fitzgerald
- Born: 1924
- Died: 29 September 2008 (aged 83–84) Manly, New South Wales, Australia

Playing information
- Position: Wing
Club
| Years | Team | Pld | T | G | FG | P |
|---|---|---|---|---|---|---|
| 1952–53 | St. George | 8 | 3 | 5 | 0 | 19 |

Lance Fitzgerald (1924 – 29 September 2008) was an Australian rugby league footballer who played in the 1950s.

Fitzgerald was graded from the St. George junior league in 1949 with immediate success. Fitzgerald was a winger in the St. George Dragons Third Grade premiership winning team of 1949. and was a regular lower grade player until retiring in 1956. He played eight first grade games between 1952 and 1953.

Fitzgerald died on 29 September 2008.
