= Frank Meighan =

Australian rugby league player (1902–1977)

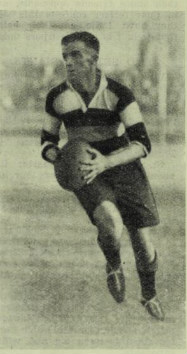
- Frank Meighan in action during the 1927 season for St.George

Personal information
- Full name: Thomas Francis Meighan
- Born: 5 July 1902 Mayfield, New South Wales, Australia
- Died: 9 May 1977 (aged 74) Newcastle, New South Wales, Australia

Playing information
- Position: Fullback
Club
Years	Team	Pld	T	G	FG	P
1926–28	St. George	38	2	1	0	8

Thomas Francis Meighan (5 July 1902 – 9 May 1977) was an Australian rugby league footballer who played in the 1920s.

== Playing career ==
Originally a fullback from the Newcastle rugby league competition, Frank Meighan trialled with the St. George club in early 1926 and was put under contract. Meighan spent three seasons at the Saints before breaking his leg in a trial match in early 1929 which resulted in a premature end to his Sydney career. He later played for Gunnedah, New South Wales, in late 1929 before returning to Newcastle. Meighan later became a funeral director in Newcastle.

== Death ==
Meighan died in 1977 at Newcastle, New South Wales and was buried in Sandgate Cemetery.
