= Lew Heuschkel =

Australian rugby league footballer

Personal information
- Full name: Louis Carl Heuschkel
- Born: 1901; Balmain, New South Wales, Australia
- Died: 5 July 1988 (aged 86–87); Kogarah Bay, New South Wales, Australia

Playing information
- Position: Wing
Club
Years	Team	Pld	T	G	FG	P
1921–22	St. George	4	0	1	0	2

Louis Carl Heuschkel (1901–1988) was an Australian rugby league footballer who played in the 1920s.

Born at Balmain in 1901, Heuschkel was a pioneer player with the St George club during the club's earliest years in the NSWRFL (1921 and 1922).

Mainly a reserve-grade player, Heuschkel played only four first-grade games during his two-year career at the club before retiring.

== Death ==
Heuschkel died at Kogarah Bay, New South Wales, on 5 July 1988, aged 87.
