= Abe Clark =

Australian rugby league footballer

Personal information
- Full name: Abe Judge Clark
- Born: 12 December 1894 Newtown, New South Wales, Australia
- Died: 15 June 1973 (aged 78) Kogarah, New South Wales, Australia

Playing information
- Position: Second-row
Club
Years	Team	Pld	T	G	FG	P
1921–22	St. George	2	0	0	0	0
- Source: As of 25 July 2019
- Relatives: Jack Clark (brother)

Abe Judge Clark (1894–1973) was an Australian rugby league footballer who played in the 1920s.

== Career ==
Clark was a foundation player in the very first year that the St. George club featured in the NSWRFL in 1921. He played predominantly in Reserve Grade during his career. He was later on the general football club committee at St. George, and was later the official representative from the St. George DRLFC to sit on the NSWRFL Junior League. Clark also played at St. George with his younger brother Jack Clark.

Clark came from a sporting family. His elder brother Harry Clark played for the Western Suburbs (1913–1914) and South Sydney in 1916. His other brother Jack was a successful welterweight boxer at the Newtown Olympia.

== War service ==
Clark enlisted in the AIF in 1915. He survived the War and returned to Australia in 1917.

== Death ==
Clark died on 15 June 1973 at Kogarah, New South Wales.
