= Jack Eason =

Australian rugby league footballer

Personal information
- Full name: John Hurley Eason
- Born: 16 August 1912 Gilgandra, New South Wales, Australia
- Died: date unknown Queensland Australia

Playing information
- Position: Second-row
Club
Years	Team	Pld	T	G	FG	P
1935	St. George	2	0	0	0	0
- Source: Rugby League Project

John Hurley Eason (16 August 1912 – date of death unknown) was an Australian rugby league footballer who played in the 1930s and an Australian Army serviceman who fought in the Second World War.

== Playing career ==
Jack Eason lived on the Woronora River, and was graded from the local Sutherland JRLFC in 1935. He was remembered as a vigorous second rower that played mainly reserve grade at the St. George Dragons, although he did feature in two first grade games during the 1935 NSWRFL season. Eason was also a noted professional boxer in Sydney during the mid 1930s.
