= Jim Flower (rugby league) =

Australian rugby league footballer

Personal information
- Full name: James Harold Flower
- Born: 16 November 1907 Rockdale, New South Wales, Australia
- Died: 16 December 1979 (aged 72) Ingleburn, New South Wales, Australia

Playing information
- Position: Five-eighth, Halfback
Club
Years	Team	Pld	T	G	FG	P
1930–32	St. George	12	2	0	0	6
1934	North Sydney	11	0	0	0	0
1935–36	St. George	14	2	0	0	6
	Total	37	4	0	0	12
- Relatives: Harry Flower (brother)

James Harold Flower (1907–1979) was an Australian rugby league footballer who played in the 1930s. Jim 'Pansy' Flower was the brother of Harry Flower who was also a St. George first grade player and NSW rep.

== Playing career ==
Flower came through the St. George juniors and made his first grade debut on 28 June 1930 in round 6. Flower was in the squad for the 1930 NSWRL Final against Western Suburbs but did not play. St George had won the initial final but due to the rules at the time, Wests were allowed to challenge for a rematch as they had finished as minor premiers. St George lost the replay 27–2 at the Sydney Sports Ground, Flower was injured for the match and was replaced by Alf Sadler.

After playing another season at St. George, Flower moved to Walcha, New South Wales as captain/coach in 1932 and then to Mudgee, New South Wales as captain/coach in 1933, and then the North Sydney club in 1934 for one season.

He returned to the St. George club in 1935 to see out his career. In 1937 he was appointed Third Grade captain/coach before retiring. Jim Flower remained at Saints for many years on the Football committee.

== Death ==
Flower died on 16 December 1979.
