= Edward Grainger (rugby league) =

Australian rugby league footballer

Personal information
- Full name: Edward Francis Grainger
- Born: 6 January 1899 Dubbo, New South Wales
- Died: 1970 (aged 70–71) Essendon, Victoria

Playing information
- Position: Centre
Club
| Years | Team | Pld | T | G | FG | P |
|---|---|---|---|---|---|---|
| 1921–24 | St. George | 1 | 0 | 0 | 0 | 0 |
- Source: Whiticker/Hudson

Edward Francis Grainger (1899–1970) was an Australian rugby league footballer who played in the 1920s.

Grainger played with the St. George Dragons in their foundation year in the NSWRFL 1921 and made his debut in a game against Western Suburbs on 7 May 1921. An ex serviceman from the First World War, Grainger played lower grade football with St. George until the end of 1924.

Edward Grainger died in 1970 in Essendon, Victoria.
