= Cec Whelan =

Australian rugby league footballer

Personal information
- Full name: Martin Cyril Whelan
- Born: 1901 Bega, New South Wales
- Died: 16 June 1960 (Age 59) Newtown, New South Wales

Playing information
- Position: Prop
Club
Years	Team	Pld	T	G	FG	P
1926	St. George	8	0	0	0	0

Martin Cyril 'Cec' Whelan was an Australian rugby league footballer who played in the 1920s.

'Cec' Whelan was a local junior who played many years in the lower grades at St. George, although he only featured in first grade in the 1926 NSWRFL season.

== Death ==
'Cec' Whelan died on 16 June 1960 at Newtown, New South Wales.
