= Jack Brierley =

Australian rugby league footballer

Personal information
- Full name: Jack Brierley
- Born: 21 September 1911; Bexley, New South Wales, Australia
- Died: 26 August 1984 (aged 72); Kingsgrove, New South Wales, Australia

Playing information
- Position: Lock
Club
Years	Team	Pld	T	G	FG	P
1930–36	St. George	26	6	0	0	18

Jack Brierley (1911–1984) was an Australian rugby league footballer who played in the 1930s.

A local junior from the Bexley junior rugby league football club, Brierley was graded in 1929 and went on to play a further six seasons with the St. George club before retiring in the lower grades in 1937. He is remembered as a slight, but tenacious Lock Forward. He later enjoyed a long association with the Bexley Golf Club.

Brierley died on 26 August 1984, 26 days short of his 73rd birthday.
