= Russell McCarthy (rugby league) =

Australian rugby league footballer and administrator

Personal information
- Full name: Russell John McCarthy
- Born: 1929
- Died: 14 August 2008 (aged 78–79); Kogarah, New South Wales

Playing information
- Position: Halfback
Club
Years	Team	Pld	T	G	FG	P
1948–53	St. George	8	0	0	0	0

Russell McCarthy (1929-2008) was an Australian rugby league footballer who played in the 1940s and 1950s.

Amazingly, Russell McCarthy first trialled with the St. George Dragons as a 16 year old in 1945. He was graded soon after, and was a mainstay in the lower grades for Saints during the late 1940s, and occasionally figured in first grade. He won a premiership with the St.George Third Grade team in the 1949 grand final in which he was Captain.

He joined the Central Newcastle club in the Newcastle competition in 1950, before ending his career again at St. George in the early 1950s.

McCarthy died at the St. George Hospital, Kogarah, New South Wales on 14 August 2008.
