= Overton Keightley =

Australian rugby league footballer

'Obe' Keightley
Personal information
- Full name: Overton Benjamin Keightley
- Born: 19 May 1913 Inverell, New South Wales, Australia
- Died: 25 October 1983 (aged 70) Potts Point, New South Wales, Australia

Playing information
- Position: Centre
Club
Years	Team	Pld	T	G	FG	P
1940–41	St George	3	0	0	0	0

Overton Benjamin Keightley (19 May 1913 – 25 October 1983) was an Australian rugby league footballer who played in the 1940s.

Known as 'Obe' or 'Ossie', Overton Keightly came from Inverell, New South Wales and was graded with the St George club in 1940. Keightley played Third Grade, Reserve Grade and 3 first grade games before joining the Australian Army at the end of the 1941 NSWRFL season.

'Obe' Keightley was a member of the St George Reserve Grade Premiership winning team of 1940.

== Death ==
Keightly died on 25 October 1983 in Potts Point, New South Wales.
