= John Deery (rugby league) =

Australian rugby league footballer

Personal information
- Born: 12 September 1975 (age 49); New South Wales, Australia

Playing information
- Position: Centre, Fullback, Wing
Club
Years	Team	Pld	T	G	FG	P
1994	St. George Dragons	3	0	0	0	0
1995–96	Sydney City Roosters	4	0	5	0	10
	Total	7	0	5	0	10

John Deery is an Australian former professional rugby league footballer and current doctor and businessman who played for the St. George Dragons and the Sydney City Roosters.

Deery, a speedy backline player from country New South Wales, attended St Gregory's College, Campbelltown and has an athletics background. He was a national junior decathlon champion. Late in the 1994 NSWRL season, Deery played three first-grade games for St George, then from 1995 to 1996 appeared in four games with Sydney City.
