= Frank Mulheron =

Australian rugby league footballer

Personal information
- Full name: Francis James Mulheron
- Born: 1918 Tamworth, New South Wales, Australia
- Died: 22 April 1990 (aged 71–72) Brighton-Le-Sands, New South Wales, Australia

Playing information
- Height: 6 ft 1.5 in (1.867 m)
- Weight: 14 st 0 lb (89 kg)
- Position: Prop
Club
Years	Team	Pld	T	G	FG	P
1944–45	St. George	12	0	0	0	0

Francis James Mulheron (1918–1990) was an Australian rugby league footballer who played in the 1940s.

== Career ==
Mulheron was graded from the Brighton juniors in 1943 and was playing first grade in 1944. A fitness fanatic, Mulheron was a big prop forward who was also a noted sculler with Glebe Rowing Club and the South Narrabeen Surf Club. He retired from playing in 1946. to concentrate on the sport of Rowing.

== Death ==
Mulheron died at Brighton-Le-Sands on 22 April 1990.
