= David Bowen (rugby league) =

Australian rugby league footballer

Dave Bowen
Personal information
- Full name: David Samuel Bowen
- Born: 6 May 1900; Mount Morgan, Queensland, Australia
- Died: 4 January 1966 (aged 65); South Coogee, New South Wales, Australia

Playing information
- Position: Wing
Club
Years	Team	Pld	T	G	FG	P
1924–26	St. George	7	1	0	0	3
- Source: Whiticker/Hudson

David Samuel Bowen (1900–1966) was an Australian rugby league footballer who played in the 1920s.

Dave Bowen came to St. George via the local juniors. He made his first grade debut against Newtown on 19 July 1924 at Pratten Park. He was captain of Reserve Grade during 1925, and was promoted for a few games in 1926 as the reserve winger. He played on for a few years in Reserve Grade, retiring in the lat 1920's. He remained close to the club for many years via the St. George Rugby League Club golf club well into the 1930s until he moved to Coogee, New South Wales in the 1950s.

David Bowen died at his South Coogee, New South Wales home on 4 January 1966
