= Chick Donnelley =

Australian rugby league footballer

Personal information
- Full name: Clayton Cecil Donnelley
- Born: 25 September 1923 Sydney, New South Wales, Australia
- Died: 30 November 1998 (aged 75) Maianbar, New South Wales, Australia

Playing information
- Position: Lock
Club
| Years | Team | Pld | T | G | FG | P |
|---|---|---|---|---|---|---|
| 1946–47 | St George Dragons | 21 | 2 | 0 | 0 | 8 |

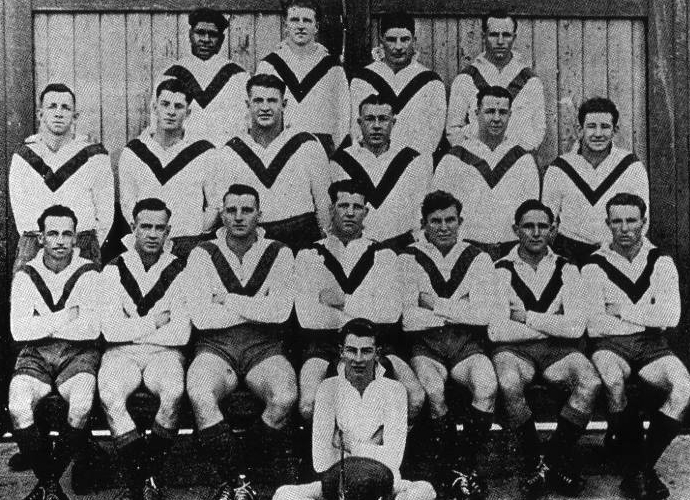
Donnelley (middle row, 2nd from left) in St. George's 1946 side - minor premiers

Clayton Cecil 'Chick' Donnelley (1923–1998) was an Australian rugby league footballer who played in the 1940s.

Originally a La Perouse junior, Donnelley was graded at St George Dragons in the mid-1940s. A big raw-boned lock-forward, he played two years of first grade with St George between 1946 and 1947. He featured in the 1946 Grand Final team that was defeated by Balmain Tigers 13–12 as the replacement lock forward for the injured Walter Mussing.

Donnelley died on 30 November 1998.
