= Jim Schuback =

Australian rugby league footballer

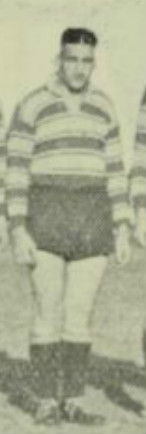
- Jim Schuback, St.George.1939

Personal information
- Full name: Wallace Joseph Schuback
- Born: 1912; Bega, New South Wales, Australia
- Died: 14 October 1965 (Age 53); Maroubra, New South Wales, Australia

Playing information
- Position: Prop
Club
Years	Team	Pld	T	G	FG	P
1938–40	St. George	38	6	0	0	18

Wallace Joseph "Jim" Schuback (1912-1965) was an Australian rugby league footballer who played in the 1930s and 1940s.

Schuback was a tough front row forward from Bega, New South Wales who came to St. George to trial in early 1938 and was immediately signed by the club. His younger brother John Schuback also joined him to trial for the Saints, but was living out of the area, and ended up at Western Suburbs. Shcuback played three seasons with St. George and retired at the end of the 1940 NSWRFL season due to the war.

Schuback died on 14 October 1965 at Maroubra, New South Wales.
