= Jack Clark (rugby league) =

Australian rugby league footballer

Personal information
- Full name: Jack Judge Clark
- Born: 11 April 1897; Newtown, New South Wales, Australia
- Died: 6 June 1973 (aged 76); Peakhurst, New South Wales, Australia

Playing information
- Position: Lock, Second-row
Club
Years	Team	Pld	T	G	FG	P
1919–20	Newtown	4	0	0	0	0
1921	St. George	3	0	0	0	0
	Total	7	0	0	0	0
- Source: As of 30 July 2019
- Relatives: Abe Clark (brother)

Jack Clark (1897–1973) was an Australian professional rugby league footballer who played in the 1910s and 1920s. He played for Newtown and St. George in the New South Wales Rugby League (NSWRL) competition. Clark was a foundation player for St George playing in the club's first ever game.

== Playing career ==
Clark made his first grade debut for Newtown against Balmain in Round 6 1919 at Wentworth Park. Clark only made 4 appearances for Newtown over 2 seasons before departing to St George who had just been admitted into the competition.

Clark played for St George in the club's first ever game which was in Round 1 1921 against Glebe at the Sydney Sports Ground. Glebe went on to win the match 4–3. The game was played on April 23 Saint George's Day. Clark would make a further 2 appearances for St George in their inaugural year before departing the club at the end of 1921.

Jack Clark was the brother of another St. George Dragons foundation player, Abe Clark.
