= Ernie Mort =

Australian rugby league footballer

Personal information
- Full name: Ernest Sutcliffe Mort
- Born: 24 March 1924; Kogarah, New South Wales, Australia
- Died: 20 September 1991 (aged 67); Port Macquarie, New South Wales, Australia

Playing information
- Position: Five-eighth
Club
Years	Team	Pld	T	G	FG	P
1947–50	St. George	25	3	0	0	9

Ernest Sutcliffe 'Ernie' Mort (24 March 1924 – 20 September 1991) was an Australian rugby league footballer who played in the 1940s.

A St. George junior, Mort was discharged from war service in the Australian Army in mid 1946. He trialled for the Saints at the beginning of the 1947 NSWRFL season, and was signed by the club.

Mort was a five-eighth, and during the end of his career, he was the understudy for the great Johnny Hawke. Mort was a well-respected man at St. George and retained a link with the club on his retirement by taking on committee positions at the club into the 1950s.

Mort retired to Port Macquarie, New South Wales in his later years, and died there on 20 September 1991, age 67.
