= Eric McCormack (rugby league) =

Australian rugby league footballer (1905-1997)

Personal information
- Full name: Eric Rowland Cornelius McCormack
- Born: 15 November 1905 Melbourne, Victoria
- Died: 3 June 1997 (aged 91) Sydney, New South Wales, Australia

Playing information
- Position: Centre
Club
Years	Team	Pld	T	G	FG	P
1927–32	St. George	16	4	28	1	70
- Relatives: Jack McCormack (brother)

Eric Rowland McCormack (1905-1997) was an Australian rugby league footballer who played in the 1920s and 1930s.

Graded at St. George in 1927, McCormack and his brother Jack McCormack gave great service to the Saints during the late 1920s to the early 1930s. McCormack was also a fine local cricketer at district level, enjoying a long enjoyable career. McCormack was a red headed centre, and a fine goal kicker having had a background in Australian Rules Football in his younger years in Victoria.

McCormack died on 3 June 1997.
