= Norm Shadlow =

Australian rugby league footballer

- Norm Shadlow. Foundation player at St.George. 1921

Personal information
- Full name: Norman Eric Shadlow
- Born: 15 October 1899 St Peters, New South Wales, Australia
- Died: 28 June 1948 (aged 48) Concord, New South Wales, Australia

Playing information
- Position: Wing, Centre
Club
Years	Team	Pld	T	G	FG	P
1921–26	St. George	46	13	0	0	39

Norman Eric Shadlow (1899–1948) was an Australian rugby league footballer who played in the 1920s and was a foundation member of the St George Dragons.

== Background ==
Shadlow was born at St Peters, New South Wales, on 15 October 1899.

== Playing career ==
He joined St. George after enlisting in the First World War in 1918. He was a member of the first St George's team that played on 23 April 1921 against Glebe. Shadlow was also a member of the first St. George's team to win a game when he played on the wing during a game against Newtown on 21 May 1921 at the Sydney Sports Ground in front of a very small crowd of 300.

He went on to play 46 first grade games between 1921 and 1926 with St George. He later enlisted in the Australian Army during the Second World War under the name of Patrick Shadlow (NX53834).

== Death ==
Shadlow died at Concord Repatriation Hospital on 28 June 1948 and was cremated at Woronora Cemetery on 1 July 1948.
