= Tom Crew =

Australian rugby league footballer and coach

- Tom Crew 1930

Personal information
- Full name: Harold Thomas Moverly Crew
- Born: 21 January 1908; Arncliffe, New South Wales, Australia
- Died: 13 June 1976 (aged 68); Kingsgrove, New South Wales, Australia

Playing information
- Position: Five-eighth
Club
Years	Team	Pld	T	G	FG	P
1930	St. George	6	0	0	0	0

Harold Thomas Moverly Crew (21 January 1908 – 13 June 1976) was an Australian rugby league footballer who played in the 1930s.

== Career ==
Crew was a noted local cricketer for Arncliffe Scots and played one year of first grade rugby league with St. George in 1930. He moved to Manilla, New South Wales in 1931 to captain/coach the local team, and was much admired. For many years the 'Tom Crew Challenge Cup' was played between Manilla and the local Tamworth rugby league team.

== War service ==
Tom Crew enlisted in the AIF in May 1940. He served as a gunner in the 2/1 Survey Regt. He survived the war and was discharged on 3 December 1945.

Crew died at Kingsgrove, New South Wales on 13 June 1976 aged 68.
