= Alf Sadler =

Australian rugby league footballer and administrator

Personal information
- Full name: Alfred David Sadler
- Born: 1906 Waterloo, New South Wales, Australia
- Died: 5 July 1975 (aged 68–69) Arncliffe, New South Wales, Australia

Playing information
- Position: Halfback
Club
Years	Team	Pld	T	G	FG	P
1930	St. George	3	0	0	0	0
- Military career
- Allegiance: Australia
- Branch: Royal Australian Air Force
- Service years: 1941-1945
- Rank: Corporal
- Conflicts: World War II

Alf Sadler (1906–1975) was an Australian rugby league footballer who played in the 1930s.

Born in 1906 to Edith May Woolmer and Samuel James Sadler.

== Playing career ==
Lower grade Five-Eighth/ Halfback, Sadler replaced the injured Jim Flower for the St. George in the 1930 Final and Grand Final.

Sadler played three first grade games during his career, his debut was against Western Suburbs in Round 4 on 17 May 1930.

In a strange coincidence, his only three first grade games were all against Wests (round 4, the Final and the Grand Final).

Sadler served in WW2 in the R.A.A.F as a mechanic. Becoming a corporal before his de-mob at the end of the war.

Sadler died on 5 July 1975 at Arncliffe, New South Wales.
