= Jack McCormack (rugby league) =

Australian rugby league footballer (1904-1996)

- Jack McCormack in 1930

Personal information
- Full name: John Charles McCormack
- Born: 25 June 1904 Melbourne, Victoria, Australia
- Died: 16 July 1996 (aged 92) Sans Souci, New South Wales, Australia

Playing information
- Position: Fullback, Lock, Second-row
Club
Years	Team	Pld	T	G	FG	P
1927–32	St George Dragons	45	1	10	0	23
1935	South Sydney	17	6	0	0	18
1937–39	Canterbury Bankstown	33	5	0	0	15
	Total	95	12	10	0	56
Representative
Years	Team	Pld	T	G	FG	P
1931	New South Wales	5	0	0	0	0
- Relatives: Eric McCormack (brother)

John Charles McCormack (25 June 1904 – 16 July 1996) was an Australian rugby league footballer who played in the 1920s and 1930s. A state representative fullback, he played with three different Sydney clubs in the New South Wales premiership competition.

McCormack seated 2nd row 4th from left in 1930

A product of Penshurst, New South Wales, Jack McCormack played with St George Dragons for five years between 1927 and 1932. He played fullback in two losing grand finals with St. George in 1927 and 1930. Good form saw him selected to play five matches for New South Wales in 1931. Jack McCormack was the brother of another St. George player, Eric McCormack.

McCormack made seventeen appearances for South Sydney in the 1935 season where he played in Souths 19-3 grand final loss against arch rivals Eastern Suburbs. He finished his career at Canterbury-Bankstown where he played between 1937 and 1939. He was a part of the Canterbury side which won their first ever premiership in 1938 defeating Eastern Suburbs in the final.

Jack McCormack died on 16 July 1996, aged 92.
