= Edward Martin (rugby league) =

Australian rugby league footballer and administrator

Personal information
- Full name: Edward Thomas Martin
- Born: 18 January 1912 Glebe, New South Wales
- Died: 1 April 1937 (aged 25) Arncliffe, New South Wales

Playing information
- Position: Second-row
Club
Years	Team	Pld	T	G	FG	P
1933	St. George	3	0	0	0	0
- Relatives: Bernard Martin (brother)

Edward Thomas Martin (1912 – 1 April 1937) was an Australian rugby league footballer who played in the 1930s.

Younger brother of Bernie Martin, 'Eddy' or 'Ted' Martin was graded at St. George Dragons from the Arncliffe Scots junior league. In 1934 and 1935 he played in Wollongong, New South Wales when he was sent there in his work with the N.S.W. Police Department.

Martin played three first grade games with the Saints in 1933, often with his brother Bernie in the same team. He was killed in a motor vehicle accident whilst visiting his family at the Arncliffe, New South Wales home on 1 April 1937. His motorbike was in a collision with a cart and his body was pierced by a shaft connected to the cart, causing him to bleed to death before he could get hospital assistance.
