= Rick Powell (rugby league) =

Australian rugby league footballer (1960–2020)

Personal information
- Full name: Frederick William Powell
- Born: 1961
- Died: 26 May 2020 (Age 59); Sydney

Playing information
- Position: Prop
Club
Years	Team	Pld	T	G	FG	P
1982–86	St. George Dragons	8	0	0	0	0
- Source: Whiticker/Hudson

Rick Powell (1960–2020) was an Australian rugby league footballer from the 1980s.

Rick was graded from the victorious St.George President's Cup team from 1981, and played some of his junior footy at Bexley-Kingsgrove & Renown junior league. Powell started his grade career in 1982 and went on to represent St. George Dragons in First Grade on 8 occasions between 1982 and 1986 before retiring. He was a regular Reserve Grade player at Saints, and he played in the 1985 Reserve Grade victorious premiership team. He is remembered as a big-hearted prop-forward during the Roy Masters era.

Rick Powell died on 26 May 2020.
