= Bill Frendin =

Australian rugby league footballer

Personal information
- Full name: Magnus Joseph Frendin
- Born: 1919; Crows Nest, New South Wales, Australia
- Died: 6 May 2014 (aged 94–95); Hurstville, New South Wales, Australia

Playing information
- Weight: 14 st 1 lb (89 kg)
- Position: Prop
Club
Years	Team	Pld	T	G	FG	P
1945	St. George	2	0	0	0	0

Magnus Joseph 'Bill' Frendin (1919-2014) was an Australian rugby league footballer who played in the 1940s.

Frendin was a lower grade player at St. George who played two first grade games in 1945. With so many players enlisted in World War II, Bill Frendin (who was a police constable at Rockdale, New South Wales) was able to fill in at prop for Bill McRitchie on two occasions. Bill Frendin was the Superintendent at the St.George Police Citizens Boys Club during his playing days and went on to become a detective in later years.

Frendin died on 6 May 2014, aged 94 at the Gannon Gardens Nursing Home, Hurstville, New South Wales.
