= Stan Root =

Australian rugby league footballer and coach

Personal information
- Full name: Stanton William Root
- Born: 28 January 1924; Sydney, New South Wales, Australia
- Died: 17 June 1973 (aged 49); Kogarah, New South Wales

Playing information
- Position: Wing
Club
Years	Team	Pld	T	G	FG	P
1946–50	St. George	27	18	42	0	138
- Father: Edward Root

Stanton William "Stan" Root (1924 – 1973) was an Australian rugby league footballer who played in the 1940s and 1950s.

== Career ==
Graded from St George's victorious President Cup team in 1941, Stan Root had a long career at the St. George club that was interrupted by World War II. He finished his career as the captain/coach of Narromine Rugby League Club in 1952.

== Personal life ==
Root was the son of rugby league player Eddie Root. He died at the age of 49 on 17 June 1973.
