= Eric Hughes (rugby league, born 1913) =

Australian rugby league footballer

Personal information
- Full name: Eric Walter Hughes
- Born: 20 January 1913; Ipswich, Queensland, Australia
- Died: 15 August 2012 (aged 99); Queensland, Australia

Playing information
- Position: Halfback
Club
Years	Team	Pld	T	G	FG	P
1936–37	St. George	9	3	0	0	9
- Source: Whitcker/Hudson

Eric Hughes (20 January 1913 – 15 August 2012) was an Australian rugby league footballer from the 1930s.

Born and raised in Ipswich, Queensland, Eric Hughes was a 22 year old miner from Mount Isa who travelled over 2000 miles at his own expense costing him £300, to trial with the St. George Dragons in 1936. He left a job at the mines where he earned 2 pounds a day in wages. He came to Sydney with his friend Jack Stathers who also trialled with St. George. During his years in Ipswich, Eric Hughes was trained and mentored by two lengedary players Jim Craig and Dan Dempsey.

He lived in Sydney with the patron of the St. George club, Jack McGrath. Hughes suffered injuries due to a motorcycle accident late in 1936. He tried out for the Dragons again in 1937, but did not play first grade again. Hughes also served in the Australian Army as a private during the Second World War.
