= Sid Bedford =

English footballer

Personal information
- Full name: Sidney George Bedford
- Date of birth: 1897
- Place of birth: Northampton, England
- Date of death: 18 September 1958 (aged 61)
- Place of death: Northampton, England
- Height: 5 ft 11 in (1.80 m)
- Positions: Centre half; wing half

Senior career*
| Years | Team | Apps | (Gls) |
| 1920–1924 | Northampton Town | 70 | (1) |
| 1924–1925 | Brighton & Hove Albion | 14 | (0) |
| 1925–1926 | Luton Town | 1 | (0) |
| 1926–19?? | Rushden Town | | |
- * Club domestic league appearances and goals

Sidney George Bedford (1897 – 18 September 1958), known as Sid or Ginger Bedford, was an English professional footballer who played as a half-back in the Football League for Northampton Town, Brighton & Hove Albion and Luton Town. He also played non-league football for Rushden Town with whom he won the 1926–27 Northamptonshire League title.
