= Kevin Harmey =

Australian rugby league footballer (1928–2010)

Personal information
- Full name: Kevin Carl Harmey
- Born: 1928 Sydney, New South Wales, Australia
- Died: 13 December 2010 (aged 81–82) Kingsgrove, New South Wales

Playing information
- Position: Wing
Club
Years	Team	Pld	T	G	FG	P
1947–50	St. George	25	13	0	0	39

Kevin Carl Harmey (1928–2010) was an Australian rugby league footballer who played in the 1940s and 1950s.

Harmey was a star sprinter at the St. George Athletic Club before signing with the St. George club in 1947.

He attained first grade selection in his debut year and is remembered as a flying right-winger and scored many tries over his career at the Saints. He is not to be confused with a Balmain centre with the same name that played between 1949 and 1952. Harmey was a reserve for the 1949 Grand Final but did not feature in the premiership winning team. Harmey retired after the 1951 season after spending the year in St. George's reserve grade.

Harmey died on 13 December 2010, age 82
