= Bob James (rugby league) =

Australian rugby league footballer and administrator

Personal information
- Full name: Robert James

Playing information
- Position: Hooker
Club
Years	Team	Pld	T	G	FG	P
1945–46	St. George	8	2	0	0	6

Bob James was an Australian rugby league footballer who played in the 1940s.

James was graded in 1944 at St. George from the Hurstville junior rugby league. He often deputised for Frank Johnson and Ken Banks at hooker. He announced his retirement at the conclusion of the 1946 season.
