= Russell Madden (rugby league) =

Australian rugby league footballer

Personal information
- Full name: Russell Francis Madden
- Born: 22 January 1922 Barmedman, New South Wales
- Died: 8 January 1987 (aged 64) Karratha, Western Australia

Playing information
- Height: 6 ft 2.2 in (1.885 m)
- Weight: 14 st 7 lb (92 kg)
- Position: Second-row
Club
Years	Team	Pld	T	G	FG	P
1944–45	St. George	9	2	0	0	6

Russell Francis Madden (1922–1987) was an Australian rugby league footballer who played in the 1940s.

Madden came up from Wollongong, New South Wales to join St. George for two seasons.

He returned to Wollongong to get married at the end of 1945 and retired from the NSWRFL.

Madden died on 8 January 1987 in Karratha, Western Australia.
