= Bill Yeomans =

Australian rugby league footballer and coach

Personal information
- Full name: William Yeomans

Playing information
- Position: Wing
Club
Years	Team	Pld	T	G	FG	P
1964	St. George Dragons	4	2	0	0	6
- Source: Whiticker/Hudson

Bill Yeomans (born in Sydney, New South Wales) is an Australian former rugby league footballer for the St. George Dragons in the New South Wales Rugby League premiership competition.

His position of choice was on the wing.

Before making his first grade debut Yeomans was for a long time the captain of the Dragons reserve side. He was very versatile, and a quick winger, he often found it hard to break into the superstar St. George side of the 1960s, and eventually moved to Newcastle to become the captain-coach of the Maitland Pickers club where he guided his side to the title in 1965.
