= Apisai Toga =

Fiji international rugby league footballer

Personal information
- Full name: Apisai Toga
- Born: 24 November 1942 (Note: ESPNscrum lists Toga's date of birth as 6 November 1945, whereas Rugby League Project lists 24 November 1942. The Papua New Guinea Post-Courier reported that Toga was 30 years old when he died, which is consistent with the latter date of birth.) Nadi, Fiji
- Died: 30 January 1973 (aged 30) Kogarah, New South Wales, Australia

Playing information
- Height: 6 ft 3 in (191 cm)
- Weight: 16.5 st (231 lb; 105 kg)

Rugby union
- Position: Lock, Prop, Second Row
Representative
Years	Team	Pld	T	G	FG	P
1963	Fiji	3	3	0	0	9

Rugby league
- Position: Prop, Second-row
Club
Years	Team	Pld	T	G	FG	P
1964–67	Rochdale Hornets
1968–72	St. George Dragons	65	9	0	0	27
	Total	65	9	0	0	27

Apisai Toga (24 November 1942 or 6 November 1945 – 30 January 1973) was a Fijian rugby union and professional rugby league player. After representing the Fijian national rugby union team in 1963, he switched to rugby league and played for the Rochdale Hornets and the St. George Dragons. He played as a lock in rugby union, and prop or second-row in rugby league.

== Playing career ==
Toga was from the Saunaka village near Nadi. Originally a rugby union player, he was part of the Fiji team that won the rugby tournament at the 1963 South Pacific Games, playing three matches and scoring three tries. His brother Sela later also represented and captained Fiji, making his debut the following year.

=== Rochdale Hornets ===
He switched to rugby league in 1964, signing for English club Rochdale Hornets. He made his debut for the club on 15 February in a home match against Workington Town. He played at second-row in the club's 5-16 defeat by Warrington in the 1965 Lancashire Cup Final during the 1965–66 season at Knowsley Road, St. Helens.

=== St George Dragons ===
Not liking the weather in northern England, Toga signed for Australian club St George Dragons in 1968, becoming the first Fijian to play in the New South Wales Rugby League premiership. He was joined at the club by his brother Inisai Toga the following year. A crowd favorite at Kogarah Oval, he made an immediate impact at the Dragons, and played for five seasons at the club between 1968 and 1972, making 65 appearances and scoring nine tries. He played in several semi finals with St George, but never played in a grand final.

== Death ==
Toga went home to Fiji during the 1972–73 off season, and cut his foot on coral and barbed wire which resulted in him dying of tetanus poisoning on 30 January 1973 after collapsing during a pre-season training run at Carss Park, New South Wales. He had only arrived back in Australia four days before his death. It was later reported that Toga was in convulsions for hours before later dying at St. George Hospital. The news of Toga's death greatly saddened the rugby league community, especially in Sydney. His body was returned to his homeland for burial on the following weekend, accompanied by Dragons captain Graeme Langlands.
