= Victor Catrios =

Greek-born Australian rugby league footballer

Vic Catrios
Personal information
- Full name: Victor Edward Catrios
- Born: 24 August 1903; Symi, Dodecanese Islands, Greece
- Died: 19 December 1968 (aged 65); Erskineville, New South Wales, Australia

Playing information
- Position: Prop
Club
Years	Team	Pld	T	G	FG	P
1926	St. George	2	0	0	0	0
- Source: Whiticker/Hudson

Victor Edward Catrios (24 August 1903 − 19 December 1968) was a Greek-born Australian rugby league footballer who played in the 1920s.

Victor Catrios came to first grade via the Banksia Waratahs Junior Rugby League Football Club in the mid 1920s. He played two first grade games for St. George in 1926 before retiring.

Victor Catrios was the first St. George Dragons player that was born in Greece, and he more than likely the first Greek-born player from any team to play first grade rugby league in Australia.
