= Walter Slockie =

- Waler Slockie 1925

Personal information
- Full name: Walter Anthony Slockie
- Born: 1903 Murwillumbah, New South Wales
- Died: 1961 (aged 57–58) Tweed Heads, New South Wales, Australian

Playing information
- Position: Wing
Club
Years	Team	Pld	T	G	FG	P
1925	St. George Dragons	8	5	0	0	15
- Source: Whiticker/Hudson

Walter Slockie (or Slockee) (1903 – 1961) was an Australian rugby league footballer who played in the 1920s and 1930s.

Walter Slockie was a very talented rugby league player from Murwillumbah, New South Wales. He featured in many of the Queensland All Black teams of this period, often playing with another St. George Dragons player, Walter Mussing. He made a brief appearance in the NSWRFL competition in Sydney with the St. George Dragons for one season in 1925, but returned north to Queensland to continue his career for many more years.

Walter Slockie - 1925

== Personal life ==
Slockie was of South Sea Islander ancestry. In 1928, Slockie saved an 18-month old child from a well.
