= Sid Rosenbaum =

American politician

Member of the Arkansas House of Representatives from the 32nd district
- In office January 13, 2003 – January 12, 2009
- Preceded by: Roger Smith
- Succeeded by: Allen Kerr

Personal details
- Born: March 10, 1967 (age 59) Little Rock, Arkansas
- Party: Republican

Sid Rosenbaum (born March 10, 1967) is an American politician who served in the Arkansas House of Representatives from the 32nd district from 2003 to 2009.
