= Allan Staunton =

Australian rugby league footballer

Personal information
- Full name: Allan Keith Staunton
- Born: 19 September 1931 Gosford, New South Wales, Australia
- Died: 8 July 1963 (aged 31) Wagga Wagga, New South Wales

Playing information
- Position: Five-eighth
Club
Years	Team	Pld	T	G	FG	P
1952–54	St. George	42	13	2	0	43
Representative
Years	Team	Pld	T	G	FG	P
1958–59	NSW Country	2	0	0	0	0

Allan Keith Staunton (19 September 1931 – 8 July 1963) was an Australian rugby league footballer who played in the 1950s.

== Career ==
Allan Staunton was born at the Roma Private Hospital in Gosford, New South Wales. Staunton came to St. George via the Port Kembla club with Leo Hurley in 1952.

He played three seasons at St. George between 1952 and 1954, and played five-eighth in the 1953 Grand Final loss to South Sydney.

Staunton later moved to Wagga Wagga, New South Wales, and represented N.S.W. Country Firsts on two occasions in 1958 and 1959. He moved into administration at Wagga Leagues Club, and as Secretary-Manager in 1963, he was tragically killed in a car accident.

== Accolades ==
A park in Wagga Wagga, New South Wales was named in his honour.

Staunton died on 8 July 1963, and was buried at Wagga Monumental Cemetery.
