= Les Polychrone =

Australian rugby league footballer

- Les Polychrone 1936

Personal information
- Full name: Louis Leslie Polychrone
- Born: 3 May 1914 Paddington, New South Wales, Australia
- Died: 6 March 1973 (aged 58) Tahmoor, New South Wales, Australia

Playing information
- Position: Second-row, Prop
Club
| Years | Team | Pld | T | G | FG | P |
|---|---|---|---|---|---|---|
| 1935–39 | St. George | 6 | 0 | 0 | 0 | 0 |

Louis Leslie Polychone (1914-1973) was an Australian rugby league footballer who played in the 1930s.

== Playing career ==
Graded from the Arncliffe junior club in 1931, Les Polychrone had a long career at St. George although his career was interrupted by a severe injury received in a car accident in 1938. Polychrone spent most of his career in Reserve Grade as either the vice captain or captain, and was highly regarded as a loyal clubman. He was a member of the team that in 1938 won St. George's Reserve Grade premiership. Polychrone retired at the end of the 1939 season.

Polychrone also enlisted and served in the Australian Army during World War II. He died at Tahmoor, New South Wales on 6 March 1973.
