= Bill Middleton =

Australian rugby league footballer

Personal information
- Full name: William George Middleton
- Born: 1920
- Died: 2 May 1951 (Age 31) Kogarah, New South Wales

Playing information
- Position: Five-eighth
Club
Years	Team	Pld	T	G	FG	P
1942–43	St. George	11	1	0	0	3
- Source: Whiticker/Hudson

William George Middleton (1920–1951) was an Australian rugby league footballer who played in the 1940s.

Bill 'China' Middleton was a St. George junior player from the Kogarah Wanderers Club. He was graded in 1942 and played two years of first grade.

Middleton played right through the 1940s in the lower grades at St. George and after retiring, he was elected to the Club Committee.

He is not to be confused with a North Sydney player with the same name during the same era.

Middleton died suddenly on 2 May 1951 at Kogarah, New South Wales, at the age of 31. Leading Sydney Jockeys got together on Sunday 10 June 1951 at Prince Alfred Park in Carlton, New South Wales in a goal kicking challenge to raise money for Bill's wife and young family.
