= Cameron Wade =

Australian rugby league footballer

Playing information
- Position: Wing
Club
Years	Team	Pld	T	G	FG	P
1990–92	St. George	19	5	0	0	20

Cameron Wade is an Australian former professional rugby league footballer who played for St. George.

== Biography ==
A utility player, Wade grew up in the small South West Queensland town of Charleville. Most of his first-grade appearances at St. George came as a winger, but he was also capable of playing five-eighth and elsewhere in the back-line.

Wade debuted for St. George in 1990 and scored the winning try in the club's win over Canterbury in round 17, which in turn caused him to injure a hamstring. Not featuring again that year, he remained with St. George for two more first-grade seasons, amassing 19 games in total.

Wade returned to Toowoomba where he played, captained and coached the Newtown Lions in the Toowoomba Rugby League competition throughout the 1990's.
