= Sid Pert =

Australian rugby league footballer

- Sid Pert. Photo taken in 1927 when he was a trainer for St.George D.R.L.F.C

Personal information
- Full name: Sidney Pert
- Born: 31 March 1890 Millers Point, New South Wales, Australia
- Died: 17 August 1966 (aged 76) Arncliffe, New South Wales, Australia

Playing information
- Position: Front-row
Club
Years	Team	Pld	T	G	FG	P
1908–19	Glebe	115	28	0	0	84
- Relatives: Sid Pert (son)

Sidney 'Sid' Pert (1890–1966) was a pioneer Australian rugby league footballer who played in the 1900s and 1910s.

== Background ==
Pert was born at Bettington Street, Millers Point in 1890 to parents Robert and Winifred Pert.

== Playing career ==
A local rugby union convert, Sid Pert joined Glebe in the NSWRFL foundation year of 1908. A prop-forward, 'Siddy' Pert played twelve seasons for Glebe between 1908 and 1919. He played 119 first grade games for the Glebe Dirty Reds, and scored 28 tries during his long career at the club. Pert played in the 1911 grand final loss against Eastern Suburbs and was also a part of the Glebe sides which finished runners up in the NSWRL competition in 1912 and 1915.

== Post playing ==
After retiring from playing, Sid Pert became a conditioner/trainer and later the time-keeper for the St George Dragons, a position that he retained from the mid-1920s until 1953. He later became an official at St George Dragons and was associated with the club for much of his life. He was also awarded life membership of NSWRFL in 1944.

His son, also named Sid Pert, played with the St George Dragons during the 1950s.

After a lifetime of service to Rugby League, Sid Pert died on 13 August 1966, aged 76.
