= Cyril Skinner =

Australian rugby league footballer

Cyril "Jerry" Skinner
Personal information
- Full name: Cyril Alfred Skinner
- Born: 1908; Queensland, Australia
- Died: 21 December 1961 (aged 52–53); Penshurst, New South Wales, Australia

Playing information
- Position: Halfback
Club
Years	Team	Pld	T	G	FG	P
1932	St George	1	0	0	0	0
- Source: Whiticker/Hudson

Cyril Alfred "Jerry" Skinner (1908 —21 December 1961) was an Australian rugby league player.

He played one season with the St. George Dragons in 1932. He played 3 third grade games, 9 reserve grade games and one first grade game on 6 August 1932.

Skinner died in Penshurst, New South Wales on 21 December 1961.
