= Reg Devine =

Australian rugby league footballer

Personal information
- Full name: Reginald Albert Devine
- Born: 1917 Cootamundra, New South Wales, Australia
- Died: 26 April 2011 (aged 93–94) Woonona, New South Wales, Australia

Playing information
- Position: Wing
Club
Years	Team	Pld	T	G	FG	P
1944–46	St. George	22	10	0	0	30

Reginald Albert Devine (1917 – 26 April 2011) was an Australian rugby league footballer who played in the 1940s. Super-fast Wollongong beach sprint champion, Devine was signed to St. George in 1944. He scored a great try on debut against the Balmain Tigers on 4 Jul 1944.

Devine crossed for 10 tries in 22 first grade games for the Dragons, before returning to Wollongong, New South Wales to captain the Illawarra team in the C.Y.C. semi-final against Central zone in September 1947 before retiring. Devine died on 26 April 2011 at Woonona, New South Wales.
