= Walter Mussing =

Australian rugby league footballer

Personal information
- Full name: Walter Mussing
- Born: 1 September 1916 Murwillumbah, New South Wales, Australia
- Died: 27 January 1990 (aged 73) Brisbane, Queensland, Australia

Playing information
- Position: Lock, Wing
Club
Years	Team	Pld	T	G	FG	P
1945–47	St. George Dragons	37	13	0	0	39
- Source: Whiticker/Hudson

Walter Mussing (1916–1990) was an Australian rugby league footballer who played in the 1930s and 1940s.

== Background ==
Walter Mussing was the son of Vanuatu born father who was a share-farmer from Murwillumbah, New South Wales and was one of eight children. Walter Mussing was an elder brother of the noted Australian civil rights activist Faith Bandler. He started his rugby league career in Brisbane, Queensland and often played with the Queensland 'All Blacks' teams of the era with another ex St. George Dragons player Walter Slockie.

== Career ==
Mussing came to St. George via the local Tweed Heads rugby league club in 1945. He made an immediate impact at the Dragons as a blockbusting try scorer. He was the club's top try scorer in his debut year, and was immensely popular with the fans. The following year, Mussing was one of the major contributors to the club's fantastic season, although he missed the 1946 Grand Final after suffering a broken collar-bone in the second last club game of the year. His place in the team was ultimately given to the young local junior Chick Donnelley. Mussing stayed with the club for the 1947 season, before returning to Queensland in 1948 to play for the Fingal All Blacks.

== Death ==
He died on 27 January 1990 aged 73.
