= Bernard Martin (rugby league) =

NZ rugby league footballer

Bernie Martin
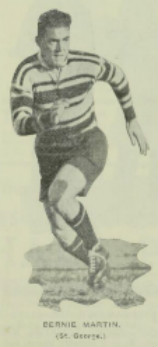
- Bernie Martin. 1933

Personal information
- Full name: John Bernard Martin
- Born: 4 October 1909 Wellington, New Zealand
- Died: 13 April 1991 (aged 81) Belmore, New South Wales, Australia

Playing information
- Position: Wing, Centre
Club
Years	Team	Pld	T	G	FG	P
1930–34	St. George	41	18	0	0	54
1935–36	South Sydney	9	8	0	0	24
1937–38	St. George	9	2	0	0	6
1940	Canterbury-Bankstown	2	1	0	0	3
	Total	61	29	0	0	87
Representative
Years	Team	Pld	T	G	FG	P
1934	New South Wales	2	1	0	0	3
- Relatives: Edward Martin (brother)

John Bernard 'Bernie' Martin (1909–1991) was an Australian rugby league player who played in the 1930s and 1940s.

== Playing career ==
A St. George local junior from Arncliffe, New South Wales, Martin was graded at St. George as a winger in 1930. He played five seasons with St. George : 1930,1933-1934 and 1937–1938. Martin played in the 1933 Final in which the Dragons were runners-up to Newtown on 9 September 1933.

He also played for South Sydney between 1935 and 1936, and finished his career at Canterbury-Bankstown in 1940. Bernie Martin's brother, Edward Martin, also played with him at St. George in 1933.

== Death ==
Martin died on 13 April 1991, aged 81.
