= Jack Mogridge =

Australian rugby league footballer and administrator

- Jack Mogridge, St.George 1929

Personal information
- Full name: John Richard Ruddell Mogridge
- Born: 28 June 1903 Granville, New South Wales, Australia
- Died: 24 March 1978 (aged 74) South Hurstville, New South Wales, Australia

Playing information
- Position: Second-row
Club
Years	Team	Pld	T	G	FG	P
1928–29	St. George Dragons	13	0	0	0	0
- Source: Whiticker/Hudson

Jack Mogridge (1903–1978) was an Australian rugby league player from the 1920s and later an administrator.

Known as a tough forward, Jack Mogridge came to St. George Dragons from Warwick, Queensland after being spotted by club stalwart Arthur Justice in Armidale in 1927. He spent two seasons at the Dragons, but suffered a serious broken leg injury in 1929, which finished his career prematurely. Mogridge stayed with the St. George Dragons in an administrative capacity, later becoming club treasurer, a selector and the club delegate to the NSWRFL. In later years, Jack Mogridge was the publican of the Kogarah Hotel, in Kogarah, New South Wales.

Jack Mogridge is also credited in being the co-writer of the old club song "We are the St. George Boys".

After many years of faithful service, Jack Mogridge was awarded life membership of the St. George Dragons in 1948.
