= Harry Hoey =

Australian rugby league footballer

Personal information
- Full name: Harry Hewitt Hoey
- Born: 20 September 1902; Adelaide, South Australia, Australia
- Died: 9 May 1966 (aged 63); Mummulgum, New South Wales, Australia

Playing information
- Position: Lock, Prop
Club
Years	Team	Pld	T	G	FG	P
1927–30	St. George	13	2	0	0	6

Harry Hoey (1902–1966) was an Australian rugby league footballer who played in the 1920s.

Graded from the Hurstville United junior club in 1925, Harry Hoey went on play 4 seasons of first grade with the St. George club, retiring in 1930. He left Sydney to become a successful farmer at Mummulgum, near Casino, New South Wales. Harry Hoey was a member of the Dragons team that played in the infamous game against the Balmain Tigers on 11 August 1928 at Earl Park, Arncliffe.

Hoey died on 9 May 1966 aged 63.
