= Christian Boyling =

Christian Boyling (flourished in 1669) was a scientific instrument maker.

All that is known for certain about this craftsman is that he was serving as "Mechanic" to the Duke of Saxony in 1669.

He designed and built a perpetual calendar held by the Museo Galileo in Florence, consisting of two overlapping brass plates sandwiching a revolving disk containing twelve enameled disks representing the months (eleven are extant) which show through a window on the front plate. The finely perforated front plate is decorated with the arms of the House of Saxony. At its center is a circle showing the hours and containing three-time disks: a moon phase night clock, a perpetual calendar, and a zodiacal calendar showing lengths of the diurnal cycle over the year.
