= Inisai Toga =

Fijian rugby league footballer

Inosi Toga
Personal information
- Full name: Inisai Toga

Playing information
- Position: Front Row, Second Row
Club
Years	Team	Pld	T	G	FG	P
1969–1974	St George Dragons	5	0	0	0	0

Inisai Toga was a Fijian rugby league footballer who played for the St George Dragons in the 1970s.

Originally from Fijian rugby union, Inisai (sometimes spelt Inosi) Toga and his older brother Apisai Toga both played second row for the St George Dragons. Inisai followed his brother to St. George in 1969 and played six seasons with St. George between 1969 and 1974, mainly in reserve grade. He played in the 1973 Wills Cup Final with St. George, only a few weeks after his brother Apisai died of tetanus poisoning at the age of 27. He retired in 1975.
