= Geoff Pullen =

Australian rugby league footballer

Personal information
- Full name: Geoffrey Ernest Pullen
- Born: 4 August 1925; Hurstville, New South Wales
- Died: 16 May 2008 (Age 82); Sydney, New South Wales, Australia

Playing information
- Position: Fullback
Club
Years	Team	Pld	T	G	FG	P
1947–48	St. George	7	0	23	0	46
- Source: As of 2 August 2019

Geoff Pullen (1925-2008) was an Australian rugby league footballer that played in the 1940s.

A local schoolboy star, Geoff Pullen played Presidents Cup for the St. George club in 1942., and was graded in 1943.

A prolific goal kicker, Pullen was playing Reserve Grade in 1944 before war service punctuated his career in 1945. He returned to St George in 1946 and featured in first grade in the following two seasons. He was back in the lower grades at the close of the decade before retiring in 1950. Geoff Pullen won a premiership with St.George's Third Grade in 1949.

Pullen died on 16 May 2008.
