= Jim Dwyer (rugby league) =

Australian rugby league footballer

Personal information
- Full name: James Roland Dwyer
- Born: 1 August 1902; Mount Lyell, Tasmania, Australia
- Died: 13 May 1983 (aged 80); Ramsgate, New South Wales, Australia

Playing information
- Position: Prop
Club
Years	Team	Pld	T	G	FG	P
1922	St. George	5	0	0	0	0
- Source: As of 31 July 2019

James Roland Dwyer (1902–1983) was an Australian rugby league footballer who played in the 1920s.

Dwyer was a pioneer player for the St. George club in their early years. A huge Front Row Forward from the Brighton juniors, Dwyer played one season for the Saints before embarking on a career in boxing in 1923, and became national heavy-weight champion under the name Jim Rowland.

Dwyer died in Ramsgate, New South Wales on 13 May 1983.
