= Bill Sadlier =

Australian rugby league footballer, coach and administrator

Personal information
- Full name: William Percival Sadlier
- Born: 1896; Annandale, New South Wales
- Died: 20 August 1968 (Age 72); Sylvania, New South Wales

Playing information
- Position: Wing, Lock
Club
Years	Team	Pld	T	G	FG	P
1922–23	St. George Dragons	10	4	0	0	12

William Percival Sadlier (1896–1968) was an Australian rugby league footballer who played in the 1920s.

A product from the Brighton JRLFC, Bill 'Chid' Sadlier was a pioneer rugby league player with the St. George club during its earliest years. Sadlier was awarded Life Membership of the St. George Dragons in 1951 after 34 years service as a player, coach, selector and committeeman.

Sadlier died on 20 August 1968 at Sylvania, New South Wales.
