= Sid Hobson =

Australian rugby league footballer (born 1917)

Personal information
- Full name: Sydney John Hobson
- Born: 3 July 1917; Wallsend, New South Wales
- Died: 2003

Playing information
- Position: Second-row
Club
Years	Team	Pld	T	G	FG	P
1944–49	Eastern Suburbs	74	8	0	0	24
Representative
Years	Team	Pld	T	G	FG	P
1950	NSW Country	1	1	0	0	3
- Source: As of 21 March 2019

Sydney John Hobson (born 3 July 1917) was an Australian former professional rugby league footballer who played for Eastern Suburbs in the New South Wales Rugby League (NSWRL) competition.

== Playing career ==
Described as a 'tough as teak' second-row, Hobson played for the Eastern Suburbs club from 1944 to 1949 in Australia's major rugby league competition – the New South Wales Rugby League (NSWRL). Hobson was a member of Easts' 1945 premiership winning side.

Hobson also played for the rural New South Wales town of Young, the 'Cherry Pickers'.

In 1946, Hobson represented his state after having been named as a reserve for New South Wales on three previous occasions.

== Sources ==
- Whiticker, Alan & Hudson, Glen (2006) The Encyclopedia of Rugby League Players, Gavin Allen Publishing, Sydney
