= Sid Field (rugby league) =

Australian rugby league footballer

Personal information
- Full name: Sidney Field

Playing information
- Position: Prop, Second-row
Club
Years	Team	Pld	T	G	FG	P
1921	St. George	2	0	0	0	0
- Source: As of 30 July 2019

Sid Field was an Australian professional rugby league footballer who played in the 1920s. He played for St. George in the New South Wales Rugby League (NSWRL) competition. Field was a foundation player for St George playing in the club's first ever game.

== Playing career ==
Field played for St George in the club's first ever game which was in Round 1 1921 against Glebe at the Sydney Sports Ground. The match was also Field's first grade debut. Glebe went on to win 4–3. The game was played on April 23 Saint George's Day and a newspaper report at the time said of the game it was "not remarkable for brilliancy". Field made one further appearance for St George in their inaugural year before departing the club at the end of 1921.
