= Bert Gordon (rugby league) =

Australian rugby league footballer

Personal information
- Full name: Bert Gordon
- Born: 1961 (age 64–65) Cowra, New South Wales

Playing information
- Position: Wing three-quarter
Club
Years	Team	Pld	T	G	FG	P
1987–88	St George Dragons	14	3	0	0	12

Bert Gordon is an Australian former rugby league footballer who played in the 1980s.

After representing N.S.W. Country Firsts in 1986, Bert Gordon was offered a two-year contract with St George Dragons. He played two seasons with the club between 1987 and 1988, and is best remembered for an amazing intercept try that he scored in the final of the 1988 Panasonic Cup midweek competition that helped to give St George Dragons a hard-fought victory. He retired from first grade rugby league at the end of the 1988 NSWRL season. Bert Gordon finished his rugby league career at Cowra, New South Wales where he led the local rugby league team Cowra Magpies to a premiership victory in 1995.
