= Dick O'Connor (rugby league) =

Australian rugby league footballer and administrator

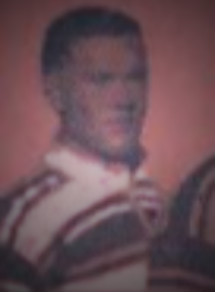
- Dick O'Connor 1938

Personal information
- Full name: Richard Gregory O'Connor
- Born: 9 September 1916 Kookynie, Western Australia, Australia
- Died: 26 February 1958 (aged 41) Bexley, New South Wales, Australia

Playing information
- Position: Wing
Club
Years	Team	Pld	T	G	FG	P
1937–38	St. George	5	3	0	0	9

Richard Gregory O'Connor (1916–1958) was an Australian rugby league footballer who played in the 1930s. He later became an administrator.

Dick O'Connor was a local junior that was graded by St. George Dragons in 1936. He was a mainstay in the Reserve Grade teams of that era, and was a member of the 1938 St. George Dragons Reserve Grade team that won the club's first ever premiership on the 10 September 1939 at Sydney Sports Ground.

Dick O'Connor played a number of first grade games before retiring as a player. Dick O'Connor, a very staunch St. George man, then joined the administration of the club in an honorary capacity and stayed with the club until his sudden death.

At the time of his death, Dick O'Connor was the club secretary of the Reserve Grade team, and was also a director of St. George Leagues Club. His death was widely mourned throughout the local community and the NSWRFL.

Dick O'Connor died in Bexley, New South Wales on 26 February 1958, aged 41.
