= Sid Boyling =

Canadian broadcaster

Sid Boyling (May 9, 1914 – November 5, 2006) was a Canadian broadcaster.

Boyling worked at radio station CHAB shortly after graduating. From October 1969 to 1979 Boyling was the General Manager of Winnipeg Videon. He helped the cable system start the community access station, VPW in 1972.
