= Hilton Dadswell =

Australian rugby league footballer

Personal information
- Full name: Hilton Ovenden Dadswell
- Born: 22 October 1903; Rockdale, New South Wales, Australia
- Died: 18 January 1952 (aged 48); Concord West, New South Wales, Australia

Playing information
- Position: Wing, Centre
Club
Years	Team	Pld	T	G	FG	P
1922	St. George Dragons	6	1	0	0	3
- Source: As of 30 July 2019

Hilton Ovenden Dadswell (1903−1952) was an Australian rugby league footballer who played the 1920s and was a pioneer player for the St. George club.

Dadswell came to St. George first grade via the Arncliffe B Grade Juniors in 1921 in the debut year of the club. His father, Thomas 'Ovie' Dadswell was a noted rugby union player who represented N.S.W. against Queensland in 1897.

He played six first grade games in 1922 before retiring from the NSWRFL.

Dadswell died at his home in Concord West, New South Wales on 18 January 1952 at the age of 48.
