= Phil McSorley =

Australian rugby league player

- Phil McSorley. 1927

Personal information
- Full name: Phillip Thomas McSorley
- Born: 1898 Grabben Gullen, New South Wales, Australia
- Died: 31 January 1970 (aged 71–72) Narwee, New South Wales, Australia

Playing information
- Position: Centre, Five-eighth
Club
Years	Team	Pld	T	G	FG	P
1925–28	St. George	29	2	0	0	6

Phillip Thomas McSorley (1898–1970) was an Australian rugby league footballer who played as a centre or five-eighth in the 1920s.

== Playing career ==
McSorley came to the St. George club from Crookwell, New South Wales and stayed for 4 successful seasons playing five-eighth or centre. He later coached St. George's Third Grade team to a premiership, became a selector and a committeeman.

== Death ==
McSorley died at Narwee, New South Wales on 31 January 1970.
