= Mark Blackburn (rugby league) =

Australian rugby league footballer

Playing information
- Position: Prop, Second-row
Club
Years	Team	Pld	T	G	FG	P
1987–90	St. George Dragons	18	2	0	0	8
1990	South Sydney	6	0	0	0	0
	Total	24	2	0	0	8

Mark Blackburn is an Australian former rugby league footballer who played in the 1980s and 1990s.

Mark Blackburn played with the St. George Dragons during the mid-1980s, and was a first grader for three seasons between 1987 and 1990. He was a reserve for the Dragons team that won the 1988 Panasonic Cup. Blackburn finished his rugby league career at the South Sydney Rabbitohs at the conclusion of 1990 after joining them mid year.
