= Jim Sibraa =

Australian rugby league footballer

Personal information
- Full name: James Benjamin Sibraa
- Born: 20 August 1896 Bourke, New South Wales, Australia
- Died: 27 December 1982 (aged 86) Dulwich Hill, New South Wales, Australia

Playing information
- Position: Centre
Club
Years	Team	Pld	T	G	FG	P
1922	St. George	2	0	0	0	0

James Sibraa (1896–1982) was an Australian rugby league footballer who played in the 1920s.

== Playing career ==
Originally from Rockley, New South Wales, Jim Sibraa joined St. George in the club's second season in 1922 before returning to his home in rural New South Wales.

== War service ==
Jim Sibraa also served in the Australian Army in World War II.

== Death ==
Sibraa died on 27 December 1982 at Dulwich Hill, New South Wales aged 86.
