= Sid Loudoun =

Australian rugby league footballer

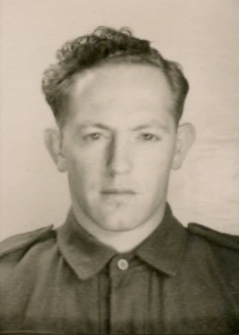

Personal information
- Full name: Sydney Thomas Loudoun
- Born: 9 July 1912 Newtown, New South Wales, Australia
- Died: 7 January 1973 (aged 60) Mortdale, New South Wales, Australia

Playing information
- Height: 5.55 ft (169 cm)
- Position: Halfback
Club
Years	Team	Pld	T	G	FG	P
1931–34, 1939	St. George	34	8	0	0	24

Sydney Thomas "Sid" Loudoun (09 July 1912 – 7 January 1973) was an Australian rugby league footballer who played as a halfback in the New South Wales Rugby Football League (NSWRFL) during the 1930s.

Known by Sid, he began his top-level career with the St. George Dragons, debuting in 1931.

He made a total of 34 premiership appearances across those seasons, scoring 8 tries (24 points) and contributing to 21 victories.

He played in 1931 & 1934 with St George, breaking his leg in 1934. He returned in 1939 to St George, but retired at the end of the season.

== Early life ==
Loudoun was born in Newtown to parents Arthur & Charlotte Rose and grew up in the Hurstville area.

Loudoun had one older brother, three younger brothers and two younger sisters.

Based on his AIF papers, he attended Tech High in Bexley for 2 years.

After school he became a Machinist.

== Playing career ==
Loudoun (sometimes mis-spelt 'Louden or Loudon") started with the St. George club in the early 1930s.

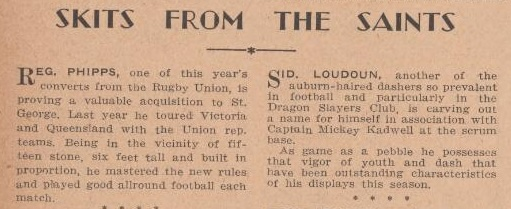
8 August 1931 Article from The Rugby League News

He played majority of his games as a Halfback, but played 6 games as Five-eighth and 5 as Centre.

He spent some time at Mudgee before returning to St George in 1934. On 18th August 1934 St George played against Western Suburb Magpies in the Semi-Finals. Unfortunately Sid broke his leg badly in the game which St George were defeated 16-6. It was his last game with the Dragons until his return in the 1939 season.

Loudoun retired at the end of the 1939 season.

== Life after rugby league & AIF service ==
Loudoun enlisted in the Second Australian Imperial Force Personnel Dossiers in 1941 in Paddington, NSW. He served in the 2/16th Infantry Battalion, and was deployed to South East Asia, specifically New Guinea, Morotai Island and Balikpapan.

He was awarded 5 World War II medals for active service

== Personal life & death ==
Loudoun was married to his wife Reta (pronounced Rita) in 1939 and had one son.

Loudoun spent majority of his life in the Hurstville area and lived with his wife in Mortdale.

loudoun's family supported the St George Dragons, and he witnessed the famous 11 in a row premiership run.

Loudoun died on 7 January 1973 at the age of 60.
