= Mark Shulman (rugby league) =

Australian rugby league footballer (1951–2022)

Personal information
- Full name: Mark Lewis Shulman
- Born: 2 April 1951 Sydney, New South Wales, Australia
- Died: 12 February 2022 (aged 70) Queensland, Australia

Playing information
- Height: 5 ft 2 in (157 cm)
- Weight: 9 st 7 lb (133 lb; 60 kg)
- Position: Halfback
Club
| Years | Team | Pld | T | G | FG | P |
|---|---|---|---|---|---|---|
| 1971–78 | St George | 58 | 8 | 0 | 0 | 24 |
- Source: RLP

Mark Shulman (2 April 1951 – 12 February 2022) was an Australian rugby league footballer.

== Career ==
Shulman was born into a Jewish family. A Ramsgate United junior, he debuted for St. George Dragons in 1971, but for much of his career he was the understudy of club legend Billy Smith. Mark Shulman played halfback for the St. George Dragons in the New South Wales Rugby League in 1970-78. In 1978, he was the team's captain. Shulman won a premiership with the St. George Dragons, playing halfback in the 1977 Grand Final.

Described as a "shade over five feet tall and weighing around ten stone", Shulman was the smallest player in first grade when he debuted in 1971. He came into the side replacing Billy Smith, who had been sidelined with a broken arm. A back and kidney injury put an end to his career at the end of the 1978 season.

On 13 February 2022, it was announced that Shulman had died over the weekend. His passing was acknowledged by current and former St George players at the following weekend’s NRL fixture. He was depicted in various forms throughout his career in Rugby League literature and most recently in artist Greg Simpkins’ piece entitled ‘Bantam’.
