= Sid Carroll (cricketer) =

Australian cricketer

Personal information
- Full name: Sidney Joseph Carroll
- Born: 28 November 1922; Sydney, Australia
- Died: 12 October 1984 (aged 61); Sydney, Australia
- Source: ESPNcricinfo, 24 December 2016

Sid Carroll (28 November 1922 – 12 October 1984) was an Australian cricketer. He played 46 first-class matches for New South Wales between 1945/46 and 1958/59.

== See also ==
- List of New South Wales representative cricketers
