= Sid Pert Jr. =

Australian rugby league footballer

Sid Pert
Personal information
- Full name: Sidney Robert Pert
- Born: 1933 (age 91–92) Arncliffe, New South Wales

Playing information
- Position: Lock
Club
Years	Team	Pld	T	G	FG	P
1954–57	St. George	40	11	0	0	33
- Father: Sid Pert

Sidney Robert Pert (born 1933) is an Australian former rugby league footballer who played in the 1950s.

== Background ==
Sid Pert Jr. was the son of the former Glebe footballer, and St. George official, Sid Pert.

== Playing career ==
Born and bred in Arncliffe, New South Wales, Sid Pert Jr came through the local Arncliffe Club to be graded with St George in 1952. He went on to play four years of first grade league with St George between 1954 and 1957.

Pert played 40 games with the club, and scored 11 tries during his career. Sid Pert is retired and living in Queensland.
