= Tom Peters (rugby league) =

Australian rugby league footballer and administrator

Personal information
- Full name: Thomas Bruce Peters
- Born: 21 January 1895; St Peters, New South Wales, Australia
- Died: 21 September 1960 (aged 65); Coogee, New South Wales, Australia

Playing information
- Position: Second-row, Prop
Club
Years	Team	Pld	T	G	FG	P
1923–26	St. George	33	0	0	0	0

Thomas Bruce Peters (1895–1960) was an Australian rugby league footballer and pioneer player for St. George in the 1920s

Peters was a forward at St. George during the club's early years. He played between 1923–26 and later became a selector for the club in the late 1920s. Peters was also a veteran on the first world war (14th Field Company Engineers).

Peters died on 21 September 1960 at his Coogee, New South Wales home.
