= Ted McHugh =

Australian rugby league footballer

- Ted McHugh 1942

Personal information
- Full name: Edward Verdun McHugh
- Born: 16 June 1916 Hurstville, New South Wales, Australia
- Died: 13 June 1982 (aged 65) Liverpool, New South Wales, Australia

Playing information
- Position: Centre, Fullback
Club
Years	Team	Pld	T	G	FG	P
1942–44	St. George	32	4	6	0	24
- Source: Whiticker/Hudson

Edward Verdun McHugh (1916–1982) was an Australian rugby league player who played in 1940s.

McHugh came to St. George from the Carlton Athletics JRLFC and was graded in 1942. He played three seasons with St. George between 1942 and 1944. McHugh played centre in the 1942 Grand Final for St George. War duties and a knee injury curtailed his rugby league career during this time, and he announced his retirement in 1945.
