= Sidra (name) =

Sidra (Arabic: سدرة) is a given name of Latin origin meaning "Goddess of the stars" or "like a star". The name Sidra is also an Islamic name, short for Sidrat al-Muntaha, a holy tree at the end of the seventh heaven. Notable people with the name include:

== Given name ==
- Sidra Ameen (born 1992), Pakistani cricketer
- Sidra Batool (born 1985), Pakistani actress
- Sidra DeKoven Ezrahi (born 1942), Israeli literature professor
- Sidra Hamad (born 1986), Pakistani badminton player
- Sidra Hassouna (2016/17–2024), Palestinian child killed by the Israel Defense Forces in 2024
- Sidra Imran, Pakistani politician
- Sidra Nawaz (born 1994), Pakistani cricketer
- Sidra Niazi (born 1990), Pakistani actress and model
- Sidra Sadaf, Pakistani cyclist
- Sidra Stich, American art historian

== Surname ==
- Eddy Sidra (born 1989), Sudanese-born Canadian football player
