= Lindsay Spencer =

Australian rugby league footballer

- Lindsay Spencer.1941

Personal information
- Full name: Lindsay Reginald Spencer
- Born: 22 November 1915 Young, New South Wales, Australia
- Died: 16 December 1997 (aged 82) Hurstville, New South Wales, Australia

Playing information
- Position: Prop
Club
Years	Team	Pld	T	G	FG	P
1941–42	St. George	25	4	0	0	12

Lindsay Reginald Spencer (1915–1997) was an Australian rugby league player who played in the 1940s. He was a premiership winning forward with St. George.

== Playing career ==
Spencer, originally from Young, New South Wales, played for St. George for two seasons between 1941 and 1942. He won a premiership with St. George as a second-row forward in the 1941 Grand Final. His playing career ended with the 1942 season.

== Death ==
Spencer had been a resident of Hurstville, New South Wales for over 50 years when he died on 16 December 1997.

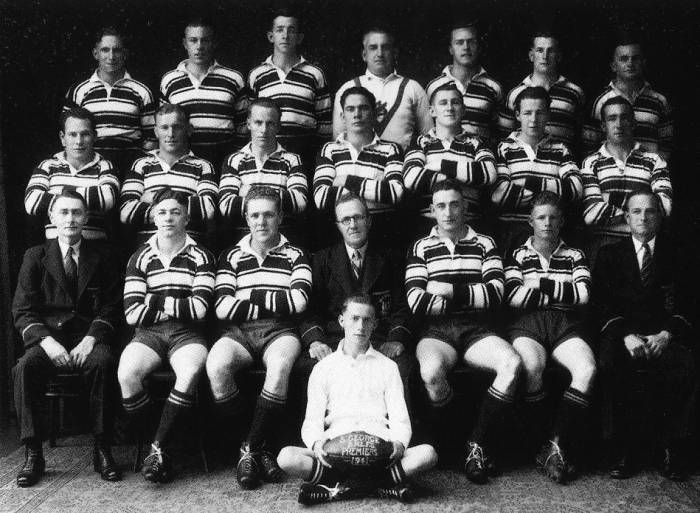
Lindsay Spencer (middle 3rd from right) in St. George's 1941 premiership-winning team.

== Published sources ==
- Whiticker, Alan & Hudson, Glen (2006) The Encyclopedia of Rugby League Players, Gavin Allen Publishing, Sydney
- Haddan, Steve (2007) The Finals - 100 Years of National Rugby League Finals, Steve Haddan Publishing, Brisbane
