= List of Newtown Jets players =

This is a list of rugby league footballers who have played first grade for the Newtown Jets. Players are listed in the order they made their debut.

== Players ==
Club
No.	Name	Career	Appearances	Tries	Goals	Field goals	Points
1	Edward Burdett	1908–1910, 1915–1917	49	4	0	0	12
2	Frank Cheadle	1908–1910	16	4	10	0	32
3	Tedda Courtney	1908	7	1	0	0	3
4	Lindsay Fairbairn	1908	3	0	0	0	0
5	Harry Hamill	1908	6	1	0	0	3
6	Rudolph Hoenger	1908	3	0	0	0	0
7	Edgar Hurford	1908	4	0	2	0	4
8	Joe MacFarlane	1908–1909	7	0	0	0	0
9	Cec Manton	1908–1909	11	1	0	0	3
10	Thomas McIntosh	1908–1909	12	0	0	0	0
11	Bill Noble	1908–1912	47	9	0	0	27
12	Chris Powell	1908	9	0	0	0	0
13	Jack Scott	1908–1909	10	4	7	0	28
14	James Williams	1908	3	1	0	0	3
15	Bertie Andrews	1908	4	1	0	0	3
16	Percy McCormack	1908	7	0	0	0	0
17	Charles Meredith	1908–1909	11	4	0	0	12
18	William Catt	1908–1911	10	2	0	0	6
19	Ernest Smith	1908–1909	4	0	0	0	0
20	Errol Taylor	1908	7	4	0	0	12
21	Scott Riley	1908	1	0	0	0	0
22	T Green	1908	2	0	0	0	0
23	Alan Northwood	1908	3	0	0	0	0
24	Fred Nurcombe	1908	1	0	0	0	0
25	Henry Powell	1908	3	0	0	0	0
26	Emmett Donovan	1908	1	0	0	0	0
27	Walter Powell	1908	2	0	0	0	0
28	Arthur Bagot	1908–1911	6	0	0	0	0
29	Herbert Chevell	1908–1910	14	1	0	0	3
30	Brett McEvoy	1908	1	0	0	0	0
31	Joe Murray	1908–1914	65	11	0	0	33
32	John Chevall	1909–1910	7	1	0	0	3
33	William Crompton	1909	10	0	0	0	0
34	Harry Hocking	1909	6	0	0	0	0
35	W Kennedy	1909	1	0	0	0	0
36	H Lee	1909	10	2	0	0	6
37	Wallace Murray	1909	9	1	0	0	3
38	Edmund Williams	1909–1910	7	3	0	0	9
39	Walter Wright	1909	4	0	0	0	0
40	Alby Hawkes	1909–1912	35	10	14	0	58
41	J Jones	1909	8	0	0	0	0
42	Fred Munnery	1909–1910	16	7	0	0	21
43	Phil Lee	1909	2	0	0	0	0
44	Henry Meithke	1909	3	1	0	0	3
45	Herbert Gaffney	1909	2	0	0	0	0
46	R Walker	1909	4	0	0	0	0
47	Alan Nightingale	1909	1	1	0	0	3
48	George Coffey	1909	1	0	0	0	0
49	Jack Donovan	1909	1	0	0	0	0
50	John Barnett	1910–1915	75	17	1	0	53
51	Bill Farnsworth	1910–1919	22	7	0	0	21
52	Viv Farnsworth	1910–1919	34	21	0	0	63
53	Frank Greshier	1910	11	2	0	0	6
54	Patrick McCue	1910–1916	82	33	10	0	119
55	William Neill	1910–1913	24	0	0	0	0
56	Charles Russell	1910–1919	69	16	102	4	260
57	David Grundie	1910–1913	50	11	0	0	33
58	Henry Brown	1910–1920	49	20	13	0	86
59	William Hayes	1910–1914	20	2	2	0	10
60	James Mogan	1910–1913	20	2	1	0	8
61	Syd Sparrow	1910	2	0	0	0	0
62	Roy Farnsworth	1911–1915	57	11	0	0	33
63	Wes Graham	1911–1912	19	4	9	0	30
64	Joe Ritchie	1911–1912	11	1	0	0	3
65	W Glover	1911–1912	18	1	0	0	3
66	W.H. Johnson	1911	1	0	0	0	0
67	Jim McCue	1911–1919	69	6	0	0	18
68	Harry Coleman	1911	3	1	0	0	3
69	R Lane	1911	3	1	0	0	3
70	W Nightingale	1911–1912	4	1	7	0	17
71	Wayne Orr	1911	1	1	0	0	3
72	Dick Watson	1911–1914	5	1	0	0	3
73	Albert Dennis	1911	1	1	0	0	3
74	Henry Stewart	1912	10	0	11	0	22
75	Frank Talbot	1912–1916	18	9	0	0	27
76	Herbert Bolt	1912–1915	42	4	2	1	18
77	Dug Nelson	1912	10	3	0	0	9
78	Edward Brooks	1912–1921	41	1	0	0	3
79	Wally Collins	1912–1917	66	26	2	0	82
80	Percy Luscombe	1912–1918	23	0	0	0	0
81	George Finley	1912	1	0	0	0	0
82	Tom Leggo	1912	3	1	0	0	3
83	Arthur Beed	1912–1920	36	5	0	1	12
84	D Turner	1912–1919	12	5	0	0	15
85	G Russell	1912	1	0	0	0	0
86	Tommy Anderson	1913	1	0	0	0	0
87	George Bain	1913–1920	79	11	42	0	127
88	Thomas Byron	1913	2	0	0	0	0
89	Wallace Green	1913	8	0	4	0	8
90	David Fitzgerald	1913–1916	4	0	1	0	2
91	Edward Griffiths	1913	10	0	2	0	4
92	Walter Haddock	1913–1914	21	2	0	0	6
93	Peter Cruise	1913–1914	14	4	10	0	42
94	Adam Mansfield	1913	1	0	0	0	0
95	Anthony Martin	1913–1917	21	6	0	0	18
96	Felix Ryan	1913–1923	127	29	0	0	87
97	Wayne Cochrane	1913	1	0	0	0	0
98	Paul Scotten	1913	1	0	0	0	0
99	Dick Townsend	1913–1923	99	25	0	0	75
100	Jack Leonard	1914–1918	56	11	42	0	111
101	Jack Townsend	1914	1	0	0	0	0
102	Paul Burns	1915–1916	22	5	0	1	17
103	Saul Martin	1915	10	2	0	0	6
104	Alexander McDowell	1915	2	0	0	0	0
105	Reg Ferguson	1915–1918	32	0	0	0	0
106	Ed Rigney	1915–1919	38	0	0	1	2
107	Bob Coulter	1915–1916	2	1	0	0	3
108	Henry Deeble	1916–1920	28	4	0	0	12
109	Bill Gillespie	1916–1919	45	10	0	0	30
110	Dan Kelly	1916–1919	22	0	0	0	0
111	John Larkin	1916	6	3	0	0	9
112	William Cockburn	1916–1919	24	9	0	0	27
113	Ed Franks	1917–1919	29	4	1	0	14
114	Wayne Lochrin	1917	6	0	0	0	0
115	Wayne Lawrence	1917–1918	19	2	0	0	6
116	Anthony Rogers	1917–1919	5	1	1	0	5
117	Page Amos	1917–1918	3	0	0	0	0
118	David McDonald	1917	1	0	0	0	0
119	Jack Flockhart	1917	1	0	0	0	0
120	P Maguire	1917–1918	8	0	0	0	0
121	Gordon Bennett	1918	9	1	0	0	3
122	George Clamback	1918–1921, 1923–1924	63	10	0	0	30
123	Eddie Hilliard	1918	13	0	0	0	0
124	Fred Seymour	1918–1919	6	0	0	0	0
125	Kurt King	1918	1	0	0	0	0
126	William Brookes	1918	1				
127	Paul Boys	1918–1920	25	2	23	0	52
128	Thomas Dagg	1918	2	0	0	0	0
129	Robert Cockburn	1918–1919	10	1	0	0	3
130	Albert Johnston	1919–1920	19	3	0	0	9
131	Walter Palmer	1919–1920	14	0	0	0	0
132	John Main	1919–1920	11	0	0	0	0
133	Jack Clark	1919–1920	4	0	0	0	0
134	George Harris	1919–1920	12	2	1	0	8
135	Len Anderson	1920–1921	13	3	1	0	11
136	Alex Bolewski	1920–1924	60	6	37	0	92
137	Henry Bolewski	1920	9	2	1	0	8
138	George Brown	1920–1921	16	2	1	0	8
139	Ernie Tate	1920–1926	15	2	0	0	9
140	Joe Mansted	1920–1926	42	9	0	0	27
141	Frank Chevell	1920–1922, 1924	14	3	0	0	9
142	Peter Shortus	1920	3	1	0	0	3
143	Charles Kell	1920–1928	85	9	2	0	31
144	Alex Main	1920–1922	30	0	39	1	80
145	Dudley Seddon	1920–1926	58	20	0	0	60
146	Eddie Gallagher	1921	5	1	0	0	3
147	Jack Knight	1921–1923	31	0	0	0	0
148	Bill Groves	1921	4	1	0	0	3
149	Alan Wardley	1921–1922	7	1	0	0	3
150	Sidney Mansted	1921–1922	19	4	0	0	12
151	Leslie Bushell	1921–1922	4	0	0	0	0
152	Harry Cavanough	1921–1922	36	8	0	0	24
153	Harold Bains	1922–1925	39	4	0	0	12
154	Herbert Edwards	1922–1924	10	1	0	0	3
155	Percy Upham	1922	3	0	0	0	0
156	Albert Carr	1922	10	3	0	0	9
157	Tom Jones	1922–1927	34	14	0	0	42
158	E.H. Stephenson	1922–1923	23	1	0	0	3
159	Fred Elliott	1922–1924	20	2	0	0	6
160	Les Bull	1922–1934	126	17	0	0	51
161	Bill Richards	1922	2	0	0	0	0
162	Andy See	1922–1923	12	5	0	0	15
163	Jack Day	1923	12	0	21	0	42
164	George Gaudry	1923–1926	18	7	0	0	21
165	Harold Andrews	1923	12	0	0	0	0
166	Ed Colbrain	1923	1	0	0	0	0
167	Alan Stevens	1923–1924	11	2	0	0	6
168	Wally Court	1923	2	0	0	0	0
169	Tom Ellis	1923–1933	128	3	275	0	559
170	Tom Leamy	1923–1930	82	2	0	0	6
171	Col Hunt	1923–1924	9	0	0	0	0
172	Albert Galway	1923–1924	7	5	0	0	15
173	Roy Cripps	1923–1924	8	5	0	0	15
174	Wally McMillan	1923–1926	24	8	0	0	24
175	Jim Bell	1924–1928	26	8	0	0	24
176	Horace Lambert	1924	1	0	0	0	0
177	Wayne Lewis	1924–1927	16	1	0	0	3
178	F Smith	1924	2	0	0	0	0
179	Keith Ellis	1925–1935	73	13	1	0	41
180	Fred Hockey	1925–1932	91	53	7	0	173
181	Perce Horne	1925	3	0	0	0	0
182	Reg Maker	1925–1926	19	4	0	0	12
183	Charlie Pendergast	1925–1929	61	3	0	0	9
184	Jim Warwick	1925–1926	20	1	0	0	3
185	Jim Fitzgerald	1925	2	0	0	0	0
186	Colin McLachlan	1925–1928	18	1	0	0	3
187	Bill Cullen	1926–1927	17	5	0	0	15
188	Vince Hughes	1926–1928	42	5	0	0	15
189	Fred Lind	1926–1930	45	3	22	0	53
190	P Little	1926	10				
191	Reg McEncroe	1926–1932	29	4	0	0	12
192	Don Waters	1926–1932	30	0	0	0	15
193	Jack Kessey	1926–1932	70	26	0	0	28
194	A Davies	1926–1936	5	0	0	0	0
195	Vince Olivera	1927	4	0	0	0	0
196	T Scott	1927	8	0	0	0	0
197	Jack Holmes	1927–1931	49	7	3	0	27
198	Alan Waterson	1927–1928	24	4	0	0	12
199	George McCarthy	1927–1932	59	11	0	0	33
200	Bill Buckley	1927–1928	5	1	0	0	3
201	F Kelly	1928	2				
202	Jack Davies	1928–1938	120	10	1	0	32
203	Carl Mork	1928–1929	21	6	0	0	18
204	Arthur Folwell	1928–1940	82	2	0	0	6
205	R Gartner	1928	1	0	0	0	0
206	Jack Gilmore	1928–1931	17	3	0	0	9
207	Ed Mayne	1928	5	0	0	0	0
208	Bert Green	1928–1930	10	1	0	0	3
209	Hans Mork	1929–1937	72	16	7	0	62
210	Jack Shumack	1929	8	2	0	0	6
211	Travis Walsh	1929–1930	23	3	0	0	9
212	Jack Thornton	1929–1934	51	12	0	0	36
213	Clem Hill	1929–1930	15	5	0	0	15
214	George Casey	1929	10	6	5	0	28
215	Bert Edwards	1929–1930	5	0	0	0	0
216	Vic Dwyer	1930	5	3	0	0	9
217	Edward Root	1930	12	7	1	0	23
218	Allan Grice	1930–1931	2	0	0	0	0
219	Len McQuillan	1930–1931	9	1	0	0	3
220	Tom Thornton	1930–1937	8	0	0	0	0
221	Paul Brophy	1930	1	0	0	0	0
222	Bruce Davies	1930	3	0	0	0	0
223	Alf Smith	1930–1933	28	7	0	0	21
224	Ron Griffen	1930	3	0	0	0	0
225	Stan Waterson	1931–1933	16	7	0	0	21
226	Frank Gilmore	1931–1935	58	10	21	0	72
227	Jack Boys	1931	1	0	0	0	0
228	Ernest Ranier	1931–1933	23	10	0	0	30
229	Les Perry	1931	1	0	0	0	0
230	Edwin Farrell	1931	1	0	0	0	0
231	Joe Gartner	1931–1935	31	13	0	0	39
232	Graham Burns	1931	2	0	0	0	0
233	Harry Hamilton	1931–1933	4	1	0	0	3
234	Wallace Jones	1931	2	0	0	0	0
235	Evan Donley	1931	1	0	0	0	0
236	Walter Anderton	1932	3	0	0	0	0
237	Fred Hermann	1932	1	0	0	0	0
238	James McMenamin	1932	9	1	0	0	3
239	Alf Hill	1932	1	0	0	0	0
240	Jack Morelli	1932	2	0	0	0	0
241	Alf Spring	1932–1935	27	0	33	0	66
242	Arthur Griffiths	1932–1933	21	6	0	0	18
243	Jack Huxley	1932–1933	8	2	0	0	6
244	Eric Pickard	1932	3	0	0	0	0
245	Harry Helmich	1932	3	1	0	0	3
246	George Owen	1932–1936	4	1	0	0	3
247	Clarrie Stevenson	1932–1935	34	2	0	0	6
248	Eric Mork	1932	1	0	0	0	0
249	Garnet Braybrook	1933–1938	31	21	11	0	85
250	Les Hession	1933–1936	14	3	0	0	9
251	Henry Porter	1933	16	2	0	0	6
252	Alan Righton	1933–1934	21	1	0	0	3
253	Clarrie Tupper	1933–1936	31	3	0	0	9
254	William Smith	1933	2	0	0	0	0
255	Jack Alleyne	1934–1935	18	4	46	0	104
256	Jim Hall	1934–1942	57	4	0	0	12
257	Roy Parkinson	1934	9	5	0	0	15
258	Eddie Cadman	1934	11	0	0	0	0
259	Ray Johnston	1934-1937	43	21	1	0	65
260	George Mansfield	1934	4	1	0	0	3
261	Gordon McLennan	1934–1945	94	5	0	0	15
262	Jack McReavie	1934	2	0	0	0	0
263	Charles Sing	1934	4	1	0	0	3
264	Wayne Curry	1935	2	1	0	0	3
265	Bill Dennett	1935	19	1	0	0	3
266	Cyril Elliott	1935	16	7	0	0	21
267	Allan Ellis	1935–1940	59	14	80	0	202
268	Frank Hurley	1935–1936, 1940	25	15	0	0	45
269	Tom Nevin	1935–1945	135	28	0	0	84
270	Albert Elvy	1935–1936	4	1	0	0	3
271	Aub Oxford	1935	2	0	0	0	0
272	Merv Whale	1935–1945	38	7	0	0	21
273	Greg Wilson	1935	1	0	0	0	0
274	Charlie Brown	1936	6	2	0	0	6
275	Jack Caplice	1936	6	2	0	0	6
276	Don Clarke	1936	2	0	0	0	0
277	Hylton Davies	1936–1939	22	1	0	0	3
278	Frank Hyde	1936–1937	15	2	0	0	6
279	Jack Kenyon	1936–1937	10	1	6	0	15
280	Albert Fordham	1936	2	0	0	0	0
281	Evan Miller	1936	3	0	0	0	0
282	George Monagle	1936–1937	7	3	0	0	9
283	Alf Davies	1936	1				
284	Ron Bailey	1937	8	3	0	0	9
285	Lew Boyd	1937	8	9	11	0	49
286	Jeff Meades	1937	7	1	0	0	3
287	Herbie Hunter	1937	2	0	0	0	0
288	Herb Narvo	1937, 1943–1945, 1949	48	15	7	0	59
289	Billy Sands	1937	1	0	1	0	2
290	Fred Smith	1937–1941	10	0	2	0	4
291	Anthony Blomgren	1938	7	1	0	0	3
292	Owen Campbell	1938	7	1	0	0	3
293	Jack Danzey Sr.	1938–1941	79	11	42	0	127
294	Frank Farrell	1938–1951	204	24	0	0	72
295	Len Tutty	1938	9	2	10	0	56
296	Athol Stewart	1938–1945	47	45	0	0	135
297	Fred Homer	1938	6	1	0	0	3
298	Frank Christensen	1938–1942	22	3	0	0	9
299	Robert Perkins	1938	7	0	0	0	0
300	Keith Sands	1938	6	0	0	0	0
301	J Fulham	1938	4				
302	Cliff Noble	1938–1943	22	5	0	0	15
303	George Stonestreet	1938–1943	45	6	0	0	18
304	Jack Brown	1938–1939	3	0	3	0	6
305	Jimmy Sands	1938	3	0	0	0	0
306	Albert Catt	1938	3	0	0	0	0
307	Alan McLachlan	1938–1939	9	0	0	0	0
308	Jack Grainger	1938–1939	4	0	0	0	0
309	Alan Wellington	1938–1940	12	1	0	0	3
310	Tommy Wills	1938–1939	5	1	0	0	3
311	Jack Kelly	1939–1940	15	1	0	0	3
312	Rowley Wilder	1939–1942	9	2	0	0	6
313	Evan Donnelley	1939	1	0	0	0	0
314	A Johnstone	1939	1				
315	Kurt O'Sullivan	1939	3	0	0	0	0
316	Trevor Comber	1939	1	0	0	0	0
317	Mal Maurice	1939	2	0	0	0	0
318	Jim Newton	1939	1	0	0	0	0
319	Henry Box	1939	7	1	0	0	3
320	Andy Hodgins	1939–1943	15	6	0	0	18
321	Les Gardiner	1939	3	0	0	0	0
322	Lin McLean	1939–1948	58	30	0	0	90
323	Fred Waters	1939–1941	5	0	0	0	0
324	Tom Kirk	1940–1946	98	14	319	0	680
325	Frank Mulville	1940–1941	14				
326	Keith Phillips	1940–1946	90	22	0	0	66
327	Ken Robertson	1940	11	10	1	0	32
328	Percy Williams	1940–1941	22	1	38	0	79
329	Jack Roberts	1940	1	0	0	0	0
330	George Debnam	1940–1950	33	0	53	0	106
331	Adrian Gleeson	1940–1944	24	9	7	0	41
332	Joe Wade	1940	7	1	0	0	3
333	Jimmy Brailey	1940–1947	63	8	0	0	24
334	Charles Cahill	1941–1947	75	29	0	0	87
335	Joe O'Donnell	1941	1	0	0	0	0
336	Bruce Ryan	1941–1945	38	27	0	0	81
337	William Ryan	1941	12	11	0	0	33
338	Roy Street	1941–1942	19				
339	Nathan Bell	1941	3	0	0	0	0
340	Robert Duffy	1941	4	0	0	0	0
341	Jack Kadwell	1941–1945	22	5	0	0	15
342	Fred Langton	1941	1	0	0	0	0
343	Walter Holmes	1942	7	0	0	0	0
344	Norm Jacobson	1942–1948	89	69	0	0	207
345	George Long	1942	1	0	0	0	0
346	Frank Speechley	1942–1944	11	8	0	0	33
347	William van Rugge	1942	1	0	0	0	0
348	John Bain	1942	2	0	0	0	0
349	Thomas Dawson	1942	8	0	0	0	0
350	Noel Edwards	1942	2	1	0	0	3
351	Jack Hourigan	1942	2	0	1	0	2
352	Paddy Bugden	1942–1943, 1945–1947	49	9	0	0	27
353	Ted McKinley	1942–1944	16	4	19	0	50
354	Ken Burnell	1942	4	0	0	0	0
355	Bernie Burford	1943–1944	19	15	0	0	45
356	Des Fullerton	1943	15				
357	Len Smith	1943–1948	74	43	1	0	131
358	Sid Goodwin	1943–1945	41	42	126	0	262
359	Keith Froome	1943–1950	72	16	120	0	288
360	Fred Harper	1944	1	0	0	0	0
361	Charlie Montgomery	1944–1945	22	2	0	0	6
362	Marcus Shortus	1944	1	1	0	0	3
363	Jim Scoular	1944	10	5	0	0	15
364	Bill Raby	1944–1945	5	1	3	0	9
365	Len Dawson	1944	6	3	0	0	9
366	Leo Ryan	1944	3	3	0	0	3
367	Alf Hall	1945	1	0	0	0	0
368	Tim Jones	1945–1946	2	0	2	0	4
369	Noel Mulligan	1945–1946, 1948	31	8	0	0	24
370	Jim Redmond	1945	6	1	0	0	3
371	Alan Taylor	1945–1946	17	12	0	0	36
372	J Frazer	1945	1				
373	Alan Cook	1945–1947	7	0	19	0	38
374	Frank Mullard	1945–1946	22	3	0	0	9
375	Horace Whitehead	1945–1946	3	0	0	0	0
376	John Dennis Boocker	1946	13	10	0	0	30
377	Harold Northard	1946–1949	28	10	1	0	32
378	John Whitfield	1946	4	0	0	0	0
379	Travis O'Connor	1946	1	0	0	0	0
380	Ted Dawes	1946	2				
381	Fred Fayers	1946–1949	30	4	0	0	12
382	Paul Stewart	1946	3	1	0	0	3
383	Horrie Kessey	1946–1953	87	48	0	0	144
384	George Duffy	1946	2	0	0	0	0
385	Laurie Doran	1947	19	3	4	0	19
386	Frank Johnson	1947–1954	118	1	0	0	3
387	Oriel Kennerson	1947–1949	46	7	103	0	227
388	Mick Mullane Sr.	1947–1950	44	17	0	0	51
389	Tom Pitman	1947–1952	76	8	0	0	24
390	Gerald Scully	1947	14	6	0	0	18
391	Len Torpy	1947–1948	6	1	0	0	3
392	Ewen Davies	1947	1	0	0	0	0
393	Robert Beckhouse	1947	1	0	0	0	0
394	John Brolly	1947	1	1	0	0	3
395	Reg Doughty	1947–1949	8	0	0	0	0
396	Jack Seymour	1947–1948	4	0	0	0	0
397	Kurt Doyle	1947	3	1	0	0	3
398	Bernie Drew	1947–1950	43	7	0	0	21
399	Alan Clifford	1947	6	5	0	0	15
400	Herbert Lulham	1948	13	8	0	0	24
401	Albert Paul	1948	1	0	0	0	0
402	Arthur Harrison	1948	14	3	0	0	9
403	Jimmy Hannon	1948	11	0	0	0	0
404	Clem Kennedy	1948–1949	9	2	1	0	8
405	Roy Dykes	1948–1950	39	7	0	0	21
406	Terence Matthews	1948–1949	13	2	0	0	6
407	Lance Kinney	1948–1949	9	6	0	0	18
408	Reg Donnelly	1948	5	1	0	0	3
409	Col Geelan	1948–1954	75	32	0	0	96
410	Bill Edwards	1949	16	10	0	0	30
411	Ron Madden	1949	17	3	0	0	9
412	Ray Preston	1949–1956	113	109	0	0	327
413	Jack Troy	1949–1952	34	37	0	0	111
414	Alf Gibbs	1949–1950	31	2	0	0	6
415	Don Dahl	1949	1	0	0	0	0
416	Peter Ryan	1949–1959	120	19	0	0	57
417	Allan Burnell	1949	1	0	0	0	0
418	Kevin Clarke	1949–1953	11	3	0	0	9
419	Ralph Green	1949	2	0	0	0	0
420	Ron Currie	1949–1953	26	8	0	0	24
421	John Tavener	1949	3	1	0	0	3
422	Bert Hewitt	1950	2	0	1	0	2
423	Dick Poole	1950–1958	133	51	0	0	153
424	Jack Hamilton	1950–1951	14	11	0	0	33
425	Vic Carter	1950–1955	37	3	0	0	9
426	Bill Longhurst	1950–1951	16	2	0	0	6
427	Jack Baxter	1950–1952	6	0	0	0	0
428	Len Johnson	1950	2	0	0	0	0
429	Gordon Clifford	1951–1958	114	7	445	4	919
430	Alan Metcalfe	1951–1952	14	0	2	0	4
431	Gavin Stevenson	1951	13	1	0	0	3
432	Lionel Wheatley	1951	9	1	3	0	9
433	Stan Larkings	1951	16	3	0	0	9
434	Jack Lindquist	1951–1952	16	2	0	0	6
435	Jack Whitton	1951	1				
436	Bobby Whitton	1951–1960	174	34	0	1	104
437	Stuart Delforce	1951	1	0	1	0	2
438	Jack White	1951	12	0	0	0	0
439	Laurie McMahon	1951–1960	79	42	51	0	228
440	Stan Archer	1952	14	1	0	0	3
441	Kevin Considine	1952–1960	138	87	93	0	447
442	Jim Evans	1952–1956	56	0	0	0	0
443	John Lightfoot	1952–1953	23	1	0	0	13
444	Don Solah	1952–1953	10	2	0	0	6
445	Joe Keighran	1952–1955	6	0	0	0	0
446	Galvin Cleary	1952–1953	7	0	0	0	0
447	Ken Watson	1952–1956	8	1	0	0	3
448	Daryl Fazio	1952	2	0	0	0	0
449	Kurt Harden	1952	2	0	0	0	0
450	Fred Maxwell	1952–1953	6	0	6	0	12
451	Charlie O'Brien	1952	2	0	0	0	0
452	Eric Barnett	1952	4	0	0	0	0
453	Les Young	1952	4	0	0	0	0
454	Ern Anderson	1952–1953	13	0	0	0	0
455	Rex Elvin	1953	15	0	0	0	0
456	Bob Godfrey	1953	3	0	0	0	0
457	Frank Farrington	1953–1959	40	1	0	0	3
458	Doug Passlow	1953	8	4	0	0	12
459	Don Smith	1953	1	0	0	0	0
460	Bob Bennett	1953	1	0	1	0	2
461	Maurie Hall	1953	1	0	0	0	0
462	Bill Edge	1953	1				
463	William Edge	1953	1	0	0	0	0
464	Brian Donovan	1953	4	0	0	0	0
465	Don Stait	1953–1956	64	2	0	0	6
466	Brian Clay	1953–1955	30	10	0	0	30
467	Henry Holloway	1954–1957	69	6	0	0	18
468	Frank Narvo	1954–1960	97	10	1	0	32
469	Ken Williams	1954	3	0	0	0	0
470	Ken Mills	1954	1				
471	Ray Kelly	1954–1956	47	10	0	0	30
472	B Byrne	1954	1				
473	Ray Aldrich	1954–1959	7				
474	Ray Aldrich	1954, 1959	7	0	28	1	58
475	Don White	1954–1955	2	0	0	0	0
476	Dave Pearson	1954	1	0	0	0	0
477	Ray McDermott	1954	1				
478	Les Hampson	1955–1958	35	0	0	0	0
479	Max Kite	1955	14	0	0	0	0
480	Alan Foskett	1955	1	0	0	0	0
481	Greg Ellis	1955–1963	120	7	47	0	115
482	Harold Kelly	1956	1	0	0	0	0
483	Tony Brown	1956–1964	119	20	6	0	72
484	Barry Bradstock	1956	4	0	1	0	2
485	Bill Bailey	1956–1957	9	3	0	0	9
486	Ron Lovett	1956	2	0	0	0	0
487	Dave Parkin	1956–1958	8	2	0	0	6
488	Robert Hogan	1956	3	1	0	0	3
489	Adam Lowe	1956	1	0	0	0	0
490	Bernie Nevin	1956–1962	8	1	33	0	69
491	Alan Cameron	1957–1960	58	1	0	0	3
492	Billy Keogh	1957	6	0	0	0	0
493	Brian McGoulrick	1957–1961	22	0	0	0	0
494	Terry McGovern	1957–1959	46	12	0	0	36
495	Johnny Raper	1957–1959	35	10	0	0	30
496	Sid Campbell	1957	1	0	0	0	0
497	Barry Harris	1957–1960	50	7	0	0	21
498	Ray Redden	1957–1961	26	6	0	0	18
499	Len Roper	1957	3	1	0	0	3
500	Bob Warren	1957	1				
501	Jim Jennett	1957–1959	12	6	0	0	18
502	Roley Selem	1957–1958	9	0	27	0	54
503	Malcolm Spencer	1957	7	2	0	0	63
504	Clarrie Jeffreys	1958–1968	89	0	0	0	0
505	F Selem	1957	1				
506	Jim Richards	1958	12	2	0	0	6
507	Noel Dolton	1959–1960	32	6	0	0	18
508	Graham Frost	1959–1962	31	16	0	0	48
509	Stan Brown	1959	1	0	0	0	0
510	Peter Meredith	1959	14	3	0	0	39
511	Ray Money	1959–1961	28	17	0	0	51
512	Ron Wright	1959–1964	65	7	7	1	37
513	Les Cadman	1959	1	0	0	0	0
514	Wal Hinkley	1959	1	0	0	0	0
515	Don Workman	1959–1961	10	1	0	0	3
516	Roley Young	1959–1960	7	0	8	0	16
517	Kevin Allen	1960–1968	83	8	0	0	24
518	Norm Allen	1960–1962	18	10	0	0	30
519	Jack Danzey Jr.	1960	7	1	1	0	5
520	Ron Hansen	1960–1965	57	3	0	0	9
521	Allan Hill	1960–1964	11	2	5	0	16
522	John Kenny	1960–1961	15	0	7	0	14
523	Brian McGreal	1960–1962	33	0	0	0	0
524	Graham Wilson	1960–1967	128	11	15	0	63
525	John Burland	1961	10	2	0	0	6
526	Ray Durie	1961	5	2	0	0	8
527	John Griffin	1961–1963	49	5	0	0	15
528	K Hall	1961	1				
529	Jim Stephenson	1961	4				
530	Brian Stevens	1961	1				
531	Ron Brown	1961	1	0	0	0	0
532	Col Corby	1961	2	0	0	0	0
533	John Nilan	1961	9	0	10	0	20
534	Ray Pickard	1961–1969	29	2	0	0	6
535	R Smith	1961	1				
536	Dudley Towers	1961–1963	39	30	23	0	136
537	Barry Wickham	1961–1963	10	5	0	0	15
538	Don Williams	1961	3	0	8	0	16
539	Jack Gibson	1962	12	4	0	0	12
540	Bobby Keyes	1962–1970	163	37	0	1	113
541	Brian Moore	1962–1973	173	90	0	0	270
542	Barry Nelson	1962–1963	33	1	2	0	7
543	John Oakley	1962–1970	99	10	0	0	30
544	Maurie Power	1962	5	1	0	0	3
545	Ken Rowlands	1962–1963	11	1	8	0	19
546	Laurie Trim	1962–1966	18	0	0	0	0
547	Peter Bloomfield	1963–1964	6	0	0	0	0
548	Jack Brown	1963–1964	10	0	0	0	0
549	Ron Cowie	1963–1968	32	1	0	0	3
550	J Zarb	1963	1				
551	Paul Cuneo	1963–1969	42	2	0	0	6
552	Pat Donohue	1963–1965	26	5	0	0	15
553	Ken Hannon	1963–1964	13	0	0	0	0
554	Reg Hatton	1963–1968	38	11	0	0	33
555	Geoff Meaney	1963–1964	7	3	0	0	9
556	John Mullins	1963–1964	18	6	47	0	112
557	Kevin Smith	1963	8	1	0	0	3
558	Vince Everingham	1963	5	0	0	0	0
559	Jim Turney	1963–1964	9	0	0	0	0
560	B Gleeson	1963	1				
561	Bob Barrett	1964	14	0	32	0	64
562	Spencer Bragg	1964	2	0	0	0	0
563	John Cox	1964–1966	28	2	7	0	20
564	Joe Grainey	1964–1966	19	2	0	0	6
565	Bruce Olive	1964–1967	69	1	0	0	3
566	Paul Quinn	1964–1967	61	4	0	0	12
567	Gary Torrens	1964–1966	17	3	0	0	9
568	Alan Chalker	1964–1965	3	0	0	0	0
569	Dick See	1964	7	2	0	0	6
570	Peter Armstrong	1965	6	0	0	0	0
571	Les Boyle	1965–1967	29	4	0	0	12
572	Ross Bullock	1965–1967	32	3	0	0	9
573	Kevin Gentles	1965	11	3	0	0	9
574	Brian Graham	1965–1967	35	0	29	2	62
575	Bob Lanigan	1965–1968	67	11	204	7	455
576	Peter Nobbs	1965–1968	40	5	2	6	31
577	Frank Puddick	1965–1968	22	1	0	1	5
578	Brian Young	1965	1	0	0	0	0
579	Bob Carnegie	1966–1972	97	19	0	8	73
580	Alf Harris	1966–1968	8	0	0	0	0
581	Peter Keogh	1966	3	0	0	0	0
582	Dick Quinn	1966–1967	29	9	0	0	27
583	Brian Blowes	1967	12	2	0	0	6
584	Dave Cotter	1967–1970	63	26	8	0	94
585	Bob Gibson	1967–1968	3	0	0	0	0
586	Jim Hogan	1967	14	4	1	0	14
587	Allan Maddalena	1967–1971	79	10	0	0	30
588	Tom Melville	1967–1974	70	22	0	1	67
589	Greg Hartley	1967	3	0	0	0	0
590	John McDonald	1967–1971	13	2	2	0	10
591	Joe Annesley	1968–1969	27	6	24	0	66
592	Gavin McLaughlin	1968	1				
593	Peter Day	1968–1969	14	0	0	0	0
594	Doug Kemister	1968–1976	108	2	0	0	6
595	Des O'Connor	1968–1973	73	3	0	0	9
596	John Stuart	1968	4				
597	Les Bell	1968–1970	4	0	0	0	0
598	Kevin Goggins	1968	5	1	0	0	3
599	Ken Haimes	1968	8	1	0	2	7
600	John Lomax	1968–1969	13	1	0	0	3
601	Tony Reid	1968–1972	22	2	0	0	6
602	Doug Coleman	1968–1971	6	0	0	1	2
603	Bill McCarthy	1968	3	0	0	0	0
604	Victor Spinks	1968	2	0	0	0	0
605	Dave Barsley	1969–1971	47	10	67	3	170
606	Jim Collins	1969	6	3	0	0	9
607	Peter Foreman	1969	18	0	0	0	0
608	Vincent Hodge	1969	6	0	0	0	0
609	Harry Raleigh	1969	19	3	0	0	9
610	Gary Castles	1969	2	0	3	0	6
611	Bob Green	1969	1				
612	Charlie Renilson	1969–1971	54	6	0	0	18
613	Arthur Brown	1969	1	0	0	0	0
614	Mark Robertson	1969–1974	53	3	1	0	11
615	Dick Taylor	1969	7	0	0	0	0
616	Joe Vasta	1969–1970	18	0	0	0	0
617	Lionel Williamson	1969–1974	112	41	0	0	123
618	Phil Cartwright	1969	3	0	0	1	2
619	Con Ryan	1969–1970	10	0	0	0	0
620	Kurt Speechley	1969	2	0	0	0	0
621	Greg Bandiera	1970–1971	18	2	0	0	6
622	John Bonham	1970–1973	73	14	195	2	436
623	Terry Bowles	1970	9	1	0	0	3
624	Col Casey	1970–1978	113	7	0	0	21
625	Oscar Danielson	1970–1972	44	4	0	0	12
626	Phil Flack	1970–1971	16	2	0	0	6
627	Ron Fogarty	1970–1978	88	13	0	0	39
628	Gary Sullivan	1970–1975	107	13	0	0	39
629	Barry Wood	1970–1971, 1978–1979	45	11	1	0	35
630	Barry Briggs	1971–1972	20	1	0	0	3
631	Dennis Gardiner	1971–1973	40	15	0	0	45
632	Danny Gough	1971	13	5	0	0	15
633	Graham Matthews	1971–1973	4	0	0	0	0
634	Dave Oliveri	1971–1973, 1975–1977	42	8	0	0	24
635	Wayne Pinder	1971–1972	7	1	0	0	3
636	Nelson Clark	1971–1972	6	1	0	0	3
637	Ian Sartori	1971–1973	10				
638	Graham Tucker	1971	1	0	0	0	0
639	Ken Wilson	1971–1983	150	25	447	28	1001
640	John Bradstock	1972–1977	51	30	45	0	180
641	Peter Byrne	1972	2	0	0	0	0
642	Bill Coverdale	1972–1974	16	1	0	0	3
643	Chris Dawson	1972–1977	53	11	0	0	33
644	Paul Dawson	1972–1977	105	17	0	0	51
645	John Floyd	1972–1978	113	29	0	0	87
646	Peter Gordon	1972–1974	36	5	0	0	15
647	Peter Parry	1972	14	1	0	0	3
648	Neil Pringle	1972–1974	64	18	0	0	54
649	Kevin Fidock	1972–1973	11	0	0	1	1
650	Terry Newman	1972	1	0	0	0	0
651	David Bell	1973–1974	7	0	0	0	0
652	Barry Cox	1973–1977	43	7	0	0	21
653	Steve Hansard	1973–1976	70	12	0	0	36
654	Paul Hayward	1973–1978	76	14	43	0	129
655	Bruce Pickett	1973, 1978–1979	27	8	0	0	24
656	Mark Cohen	1973	3	0	0	0	0
657	Neville Shoemark	1973–1975	20	0	0	0	0
658	Mick Souter	1973	6	0	0	0	0
659	Henry Williamson	1973–1974	9	1	0	0	3
660	Steve Kosta	1974–1978	75	15	0	0	45
661	Kevin Bradstock	1974–1976	17	6	7	0	32
662	Terry Welsh	1974	4	0	0	0	0
663	Paul Murphy	1974	1	0	0	0	0
664	Gary Jenkins	1974	1	0	0	0	0
665	Bill Feggans	1974	4	1	0	0	3
666	Martin Murphy	1974	1	0	0	0	0
667	Kerry Morrison	1974	1	0	0	0	0
668	Rob Sullivan	1974–1976	47	1	0	0	3
669	Brian Robertson	1974–1978	40	8	60	0	144
670	Terry Murphy	1975	16	5	0	0	15
671	Doug Lucas	1975–1976	22	0	0	0	0
672	Mark Wright	1975–1979	79	34	0	0	102
673	Brian Plummer	1975–1976	26	7	9	0	39
674	Warren Megarrity	1976–1977	5	0	0	0	0
675	Ron Turner	1976	10	0	0	0	0
676	Bruce Langdale	1976	6	1	0	0	3
677	Col Murphy	1976–1983	62	4	0	0	13
678	Peter Johnson	1976–1977	13	0	0	0	0
679	Gordon Russell	1976	4	0	0	0	0
680	Bill Sinodinos	1976	1	0	0	0	0
681	Geoff Mason	1976–1977	6	0	0	0	0
682	Greg Gilmore	1976	1	0	0	0	0
683	Paul Sharpe	1976	3	0	0	0	0
684	Les Cooley	1976–1980	21	3	0	0	9
685	Chris Doyle	1976–1983	66	14	0	0	43
686	Geoff Edwards	1977	12	3	0	0	9
687	Bruce Gibbs	1977	12	0	0	0	0
688	Manfred Moore	1977	5	1	0	0	3
689	Fred Pagano	1977–1978	26	4	0	0	12
690	Ron Pilon	1977–1978	40	5	0	0	15
691	Phil Young	1977	16	1	0	0	3
692	Bernie Burke	1977	2	0	0	0	0
693	Mark O'Brien	1977–1983	53	5	0	0	16
694	Phil Sigsworth	1977–1982	109	32	36	2	170
695	Terry Elford	1977	6	0	0	0	0
696	Brendan Billingham	1977	2	0	0	0	0
697	Graham Faux	1977	4	0	0	0	0
698	Mick McNamara	1977	2				
699	Genaro Panzarino	1977–1978	8	1	0	0	3
700	Peter Raper	1977	2	0	0	0	0
701	Jeff Hunt	1977–1981	14	4	1	0	14
702	Dennis Dobson	1977	1	0	0	0	0
703	Jim Walters	1977–1982	39	8	0	0	24
704	Tony Bickhoff	1977–1978	3	0	0	0	0
705	Steve Bowden	1978–1982	76	15	0	0	45
706	Brian Hetherington	1978–1981	87	14	0	0	42
707	Greg Howard	1978	6	0	0	0	0
708	Barry Jensen	1978–1981	81	7	0	0	21
709	John Ribot	1978–1979	31	19	7	0	71
710	Mick Kermode	1978	10	5	21	0	57
711	Steve Nicholson	1978–1979	16	0	0	0	0
712	Alan Parker	1978	3	1	0	0	3
713	Kevin Pobjie	1978–1979	10	4	0	0	12
714	Gary Boyd	1978	6	1	0	0	3
715	Joe Buttita	1978	1	0	0	0	0
716	Craig Ellis	1978–1983	82	7	0	0	23
717	Bill Grech	1978–1981	5	3	0	0	9
718	Dean Dalton	1978	1	0	0	0	0
719	Luke Oborn	1978	1	0	0	0	0
720	Steve Blyth	1979–1982	42	3	0	0	9
721	Phil Charlton	1979	1	0	0	0	0
722	Ted Goodwin	1979	5				
723	Steve Hage	1979	9	0	0	0	0
724	Bill Noonan	1979–1980	35	3	0	0	9
725	Mick Ryan	1979–1982	84	22	0	0	66
726	Trevor Ryan	1979–1980	42	8	1	0	26
727	Mark Ogilvie	1979–1981	18	0	0	0	0
728	Peter Rowles	1979	10	2	9	0	24
729	Des Dykes	1979	2	0	0	0	0
730	Geoff Bugden	1979–1981	46	7	0	0	21
731	Les Westwood	1979	4	0	0	0	0
732	Peter Leffley	1979	1	0	0	0	0
733	Doug van Vilet	1979–1980	6	1	0	0	3
734	Graeme O'Grady	1980–1982	68	13	7	0	53
735	Michael Pitman	1980–1982	61	8	0	0	24
736	Tommy Raudonikis	1980–1982	37	4	0	0	12
737	Greg Watt	1980	5	2	2	0	10
738	Peter Ryan Jr.	1980	6	0	0	0	0
739	John Mackay	1980–1982	23	0	0	0	0
740	Dave Mooney	1980–1981	4	0	0	0	0
741	Larry Briggenshaw	1980	1	0	0	0	0
742	Ray Blacklock	1981–1982	31	13	0	0	39
743	John Ferguson	1981–1983	74	40	0	0	135
744	Phil Gould	1981–1982	17	2	7	0	20
745	Shane McKellar	1981	15	5	0	0	15
746	Michael Pobjie	1981–1982	16	6	0	0	18
747	Paul Morris	1981–1982	18	2	8	0	22
748	Ken Lysaught	1981	2	0	0	0	0
749	Paul Akkary	1981–1983	6	0	0	0	0
750	Mark Bugden	1981–1983	34	7	0	0	24
751	Grant Ellis	1981–1982	4	0	0	0	0
752	Jim Emirian	1981–1983	4	0	0	0	0
753	Mal Graham	1982–1983	47	9	0	0	29
754	Peter Kelly	1982–1983	33	5	0	0	17
755	Wayne Newling	1982–1983	20	1	0	0	3
756	Les Mara	1982	7	1	0	0	3
757	Ron Sigsworth	1982–1983	25	11	1	0	42
758	John Crow	1982	1	0	0	0	0
759	Dean Lance	1982–1983	40	6	0	0	24
760	Allan McMahon	1982	22	8	0	0	24
761	John Standen	1982	1	0	0	0	0
762	Brian Cummins	1982–1983	11	0	0	0	0
763	Mark Oliveira	1982–1983	2	0	0	0	0
764	Gerry Byron	1982–1983	8	0	0	0	0
765	John Bird	1983	7	0	2	0	4
766	Rick Chisholm	1983	3	0	1	0	2
767	Geoff Coburn	1983	12	0	0	0	0
768	Ray Downie	1983	15	1	0	0	4
769	Lance Thompson	1983	13	1	1	0	6
770	Mark Snuggs	1983	4	0	0	0	0
771	Michael Speechley	1983	17	5	1	0	22
772	Gary Webster	1983	22	1	0	0	4
773	Tim Barnes	1983	20	4	0	0	16
774	Allen Geelan	1983	18	3	0	0	12
775	Greg Brown	1983	18	1	0	0	4
776	John Elias	1983	1	0	0	0	0
777	John Conway	1983	1	0	0	0	0
778	Trevor McCaffery	1983	2	0	0	0	0
779	Michael Madrusan	1983	1	0	0	0	0
