= 1933 NSWRFL season =

New South Wales Rugby League season

1933 New South Wales Rugby Football League
- Teams: 8
- Premiers: Newtown (2nd title)
- Minor premiers: Newtown (2nd title)
- Matches played: 59
- Top points scorer(s): Syd Christensen (86)
- Wooden spoon: Western Suburbs (6th spoon)
- Top try-scorer(s): Jack Gray-Spence (11)

The 1933 NSWRFL season was the twenty-sixth season of Sydney’s professional rugby league club competition, Australia’s first. Eight teams from across the city contested the New South Wales Rugby Football League premiership during the season, which lasted from April until September, and culminated in Newtown’s victory over St. George in the final.

== Season summary ==
When the Kangaroos sailed for England in July, the NSWRFL premiership, with a mere five rounds completed, was turned on its head. After losing the opening four matches of the season, last-placed Newtown won eleven of their next twelve matches to take the premiership, whilst Wests, who had won four and drawn one of six games, lost several key players and did not win another match. The Magpies lost virtually their entire backline of McMillan, Pearce, Ridley, Mead and the up-and-coming Vic Hey, and also suffered from their refusal to reappoint coach Jim Craig.

=== Teams ===
- Balmain, formed on January 23, 1908, at Balmain Town Hall
- Eastern Suburbs, formed on January 24, 1908, at Paddington Town Hall
- Newtown, formed on January 14, 1908
- North Sydney, formed on February 7, 1908
- South Sydney, formed on January 17, 1908, at Redfern Town Hall
- St. George, formed on November 8, 1920, at Kogarah School of Arts
- Western Suburbs, formed on February 4, 1908
- University, formed in 1919 at Sydney University

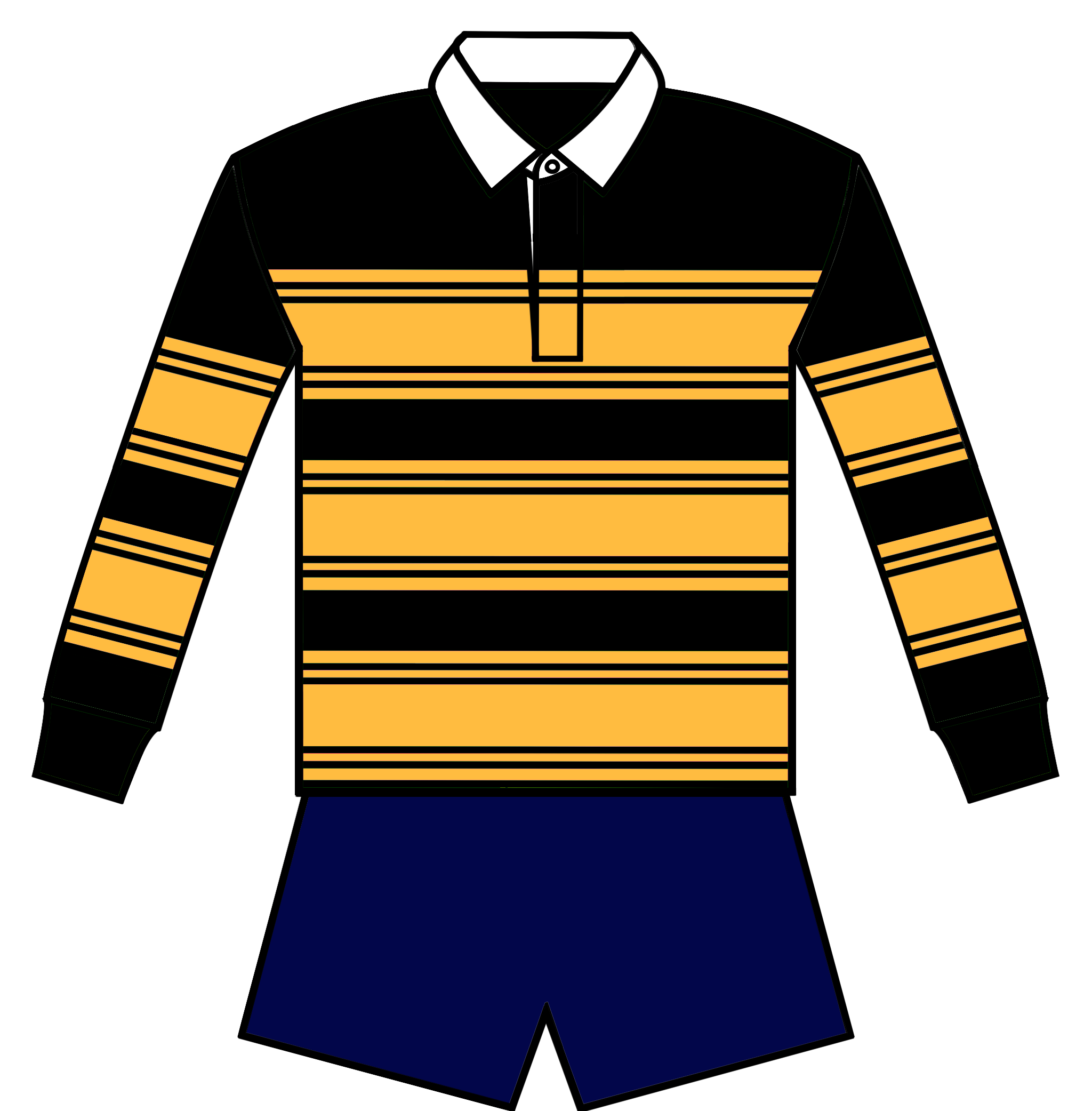
Balmain 26th season Ground: Drummoyne Oval; Coach: George Robinson; Captain: Arthur Toby

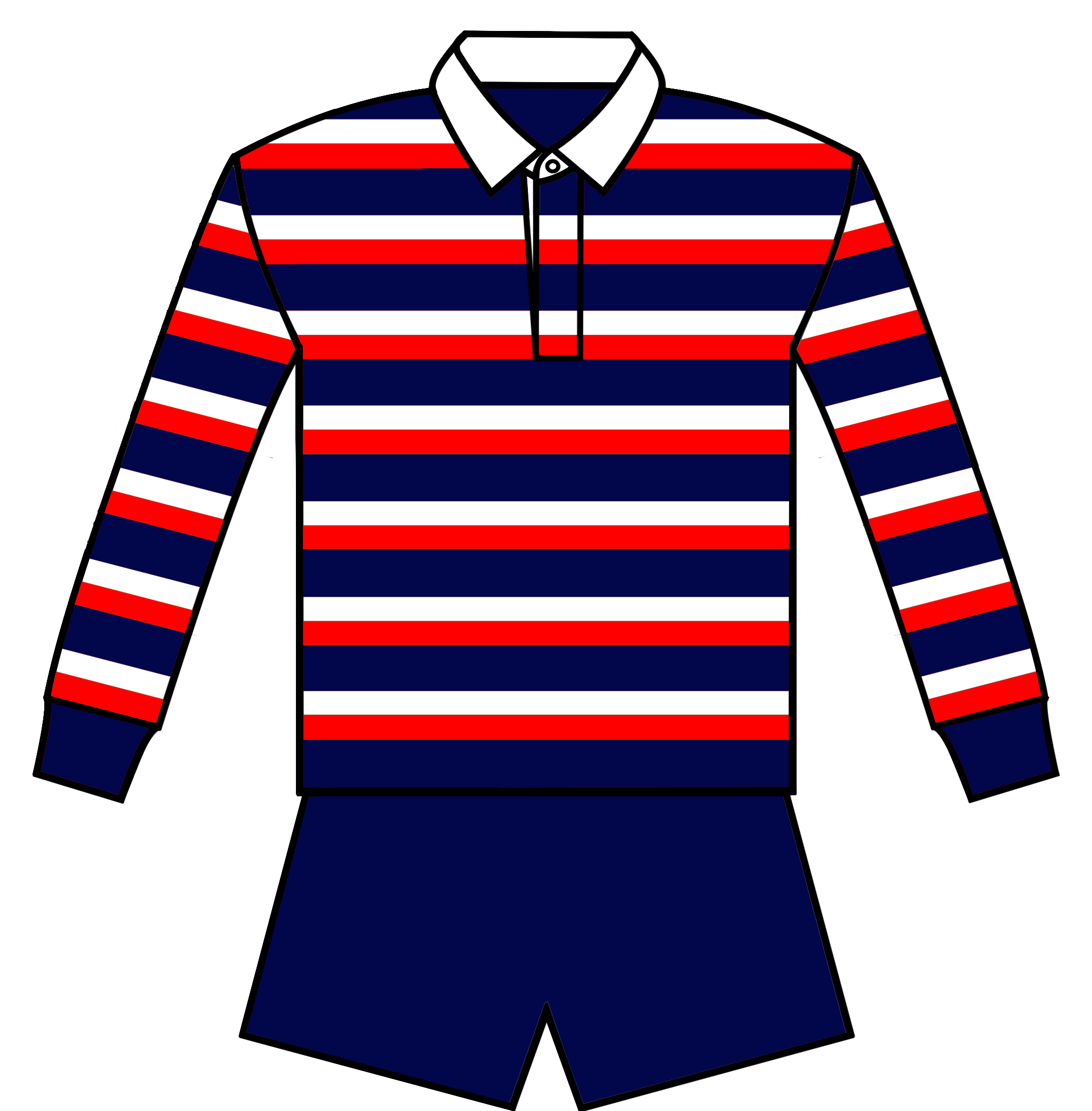
Eastern Suburbs 26th season Ground: Sydney Sports Ground; Coach: Arthur Halloway; Captain(s): Sid Pearce, Ernie Norman

Newtown 26th season Ground: Marrickville Oval; Coach: Charles "Boxer" Russell; Captain: Keith Ellis

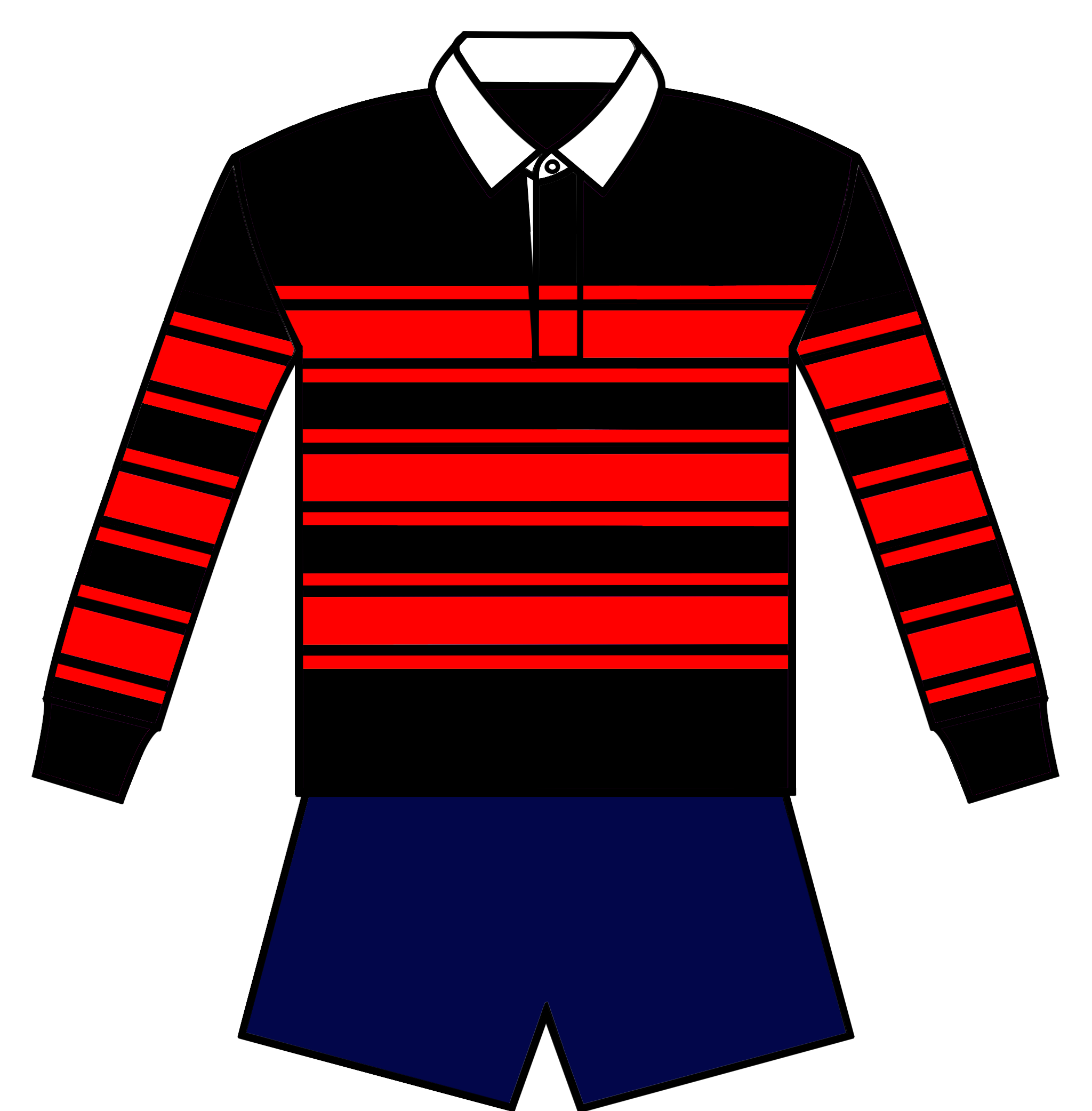
North Sydney 26th season Ground: North Sydney Oval; Captain-Coach: Arthur Edwards

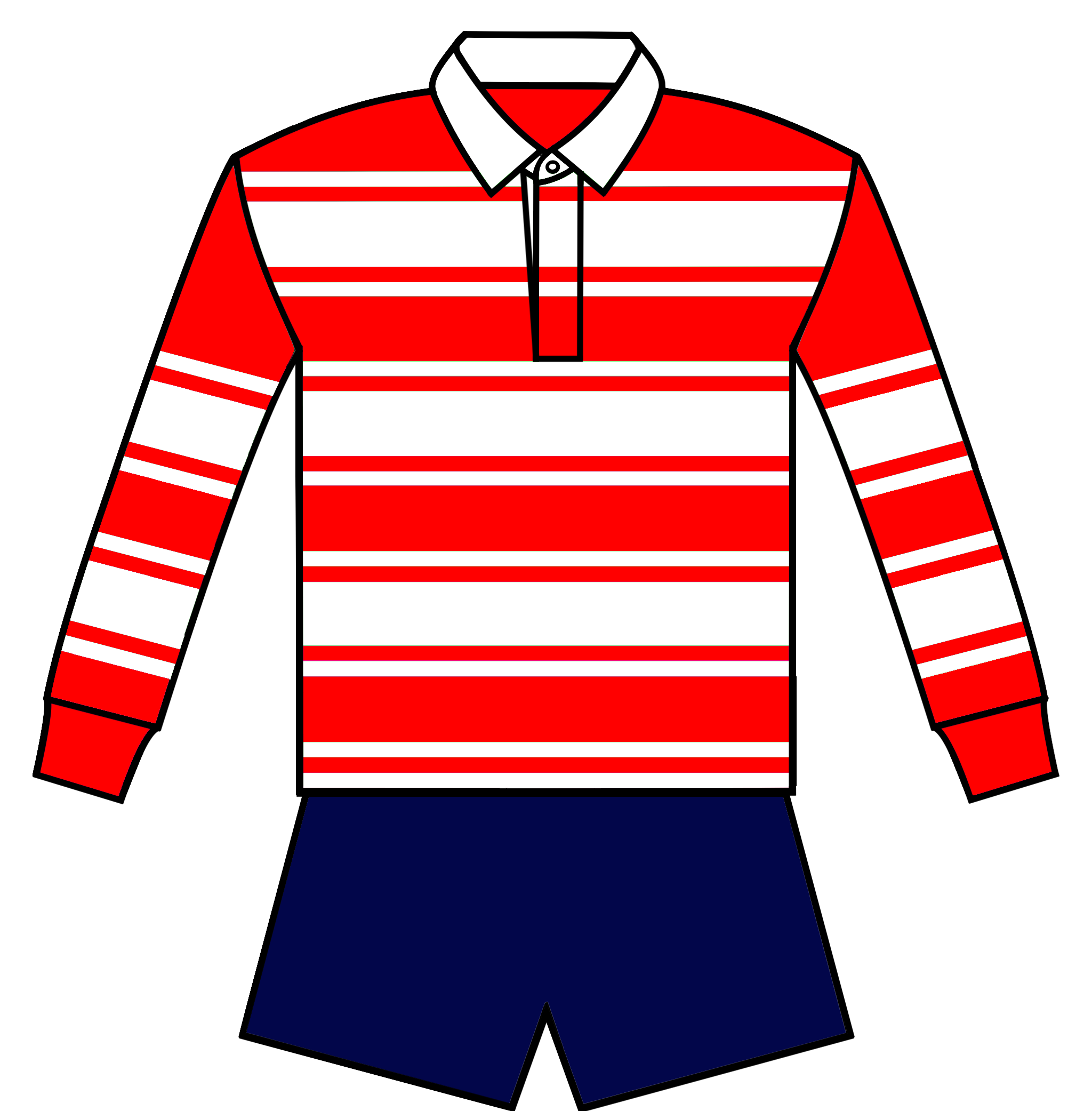
St. George 13th season Ground: Earl Park; Coach: Albert Johnston; Captain: Harry Kadwell

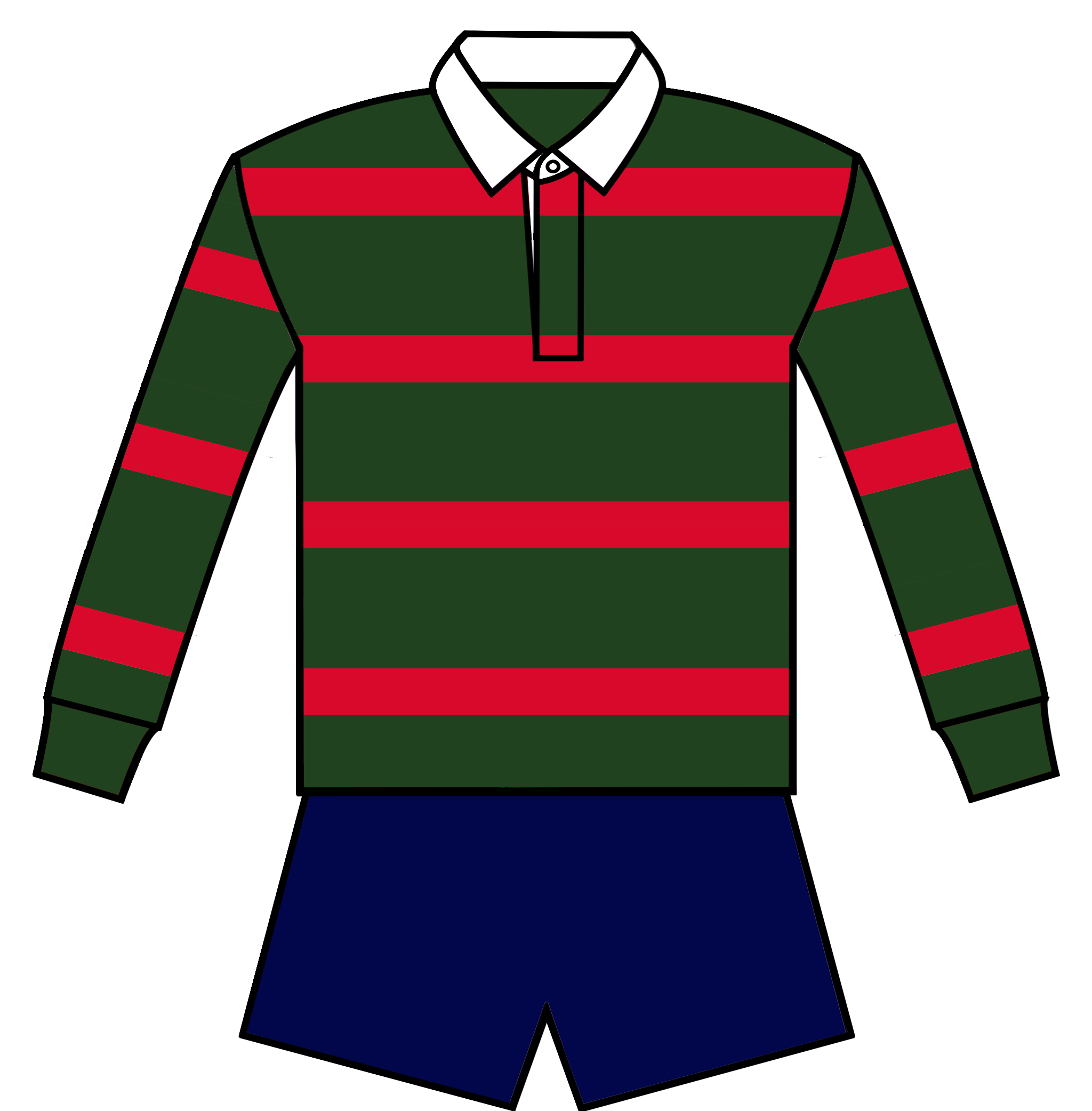
South Sydney 26th season Ground: Sydney Sports Ground; Coach: Charlie Lynch; Captain: George Treweek

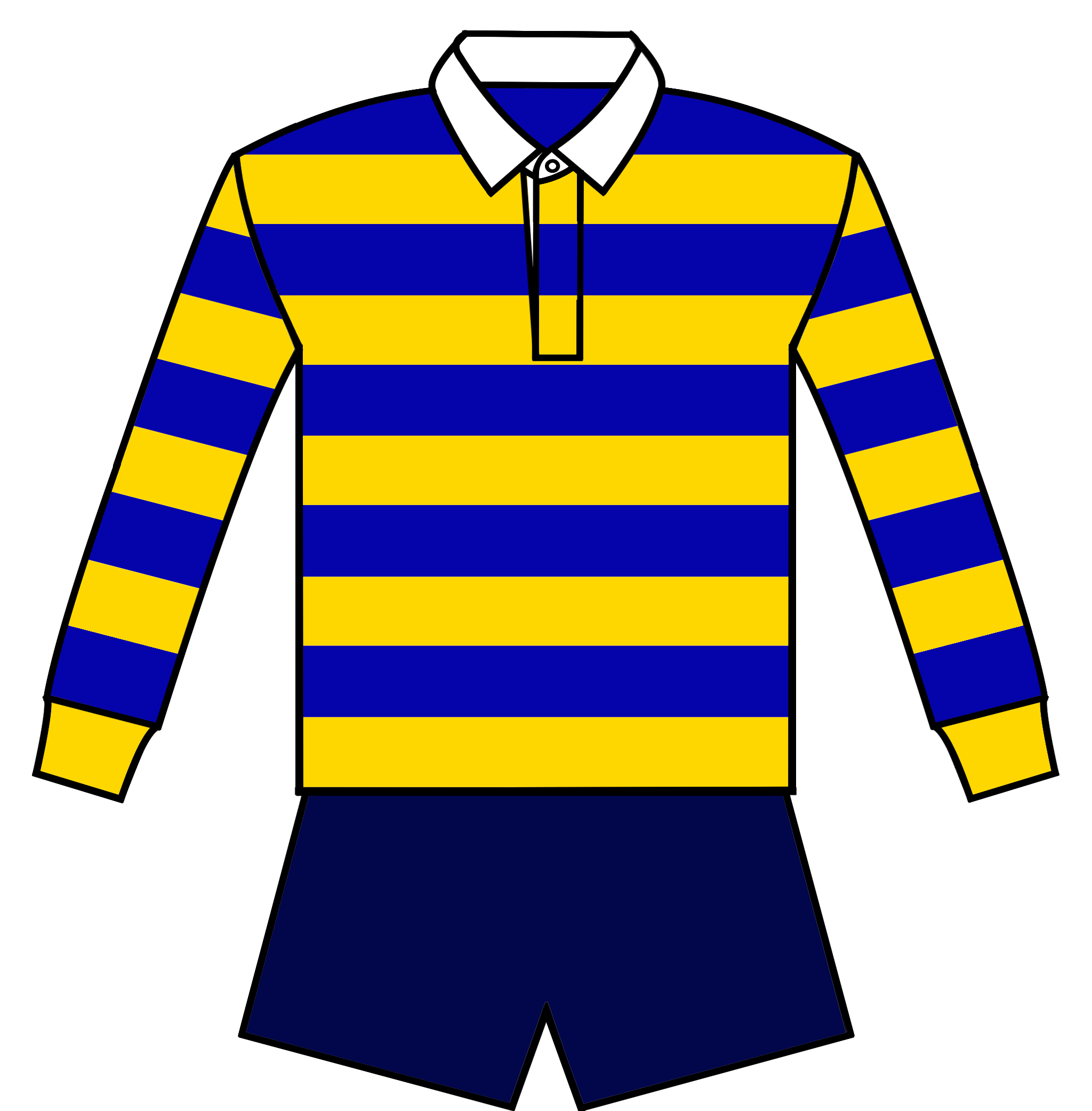
University 14th season Coach: Gordon Favelle; Captain: Sammy Ogg

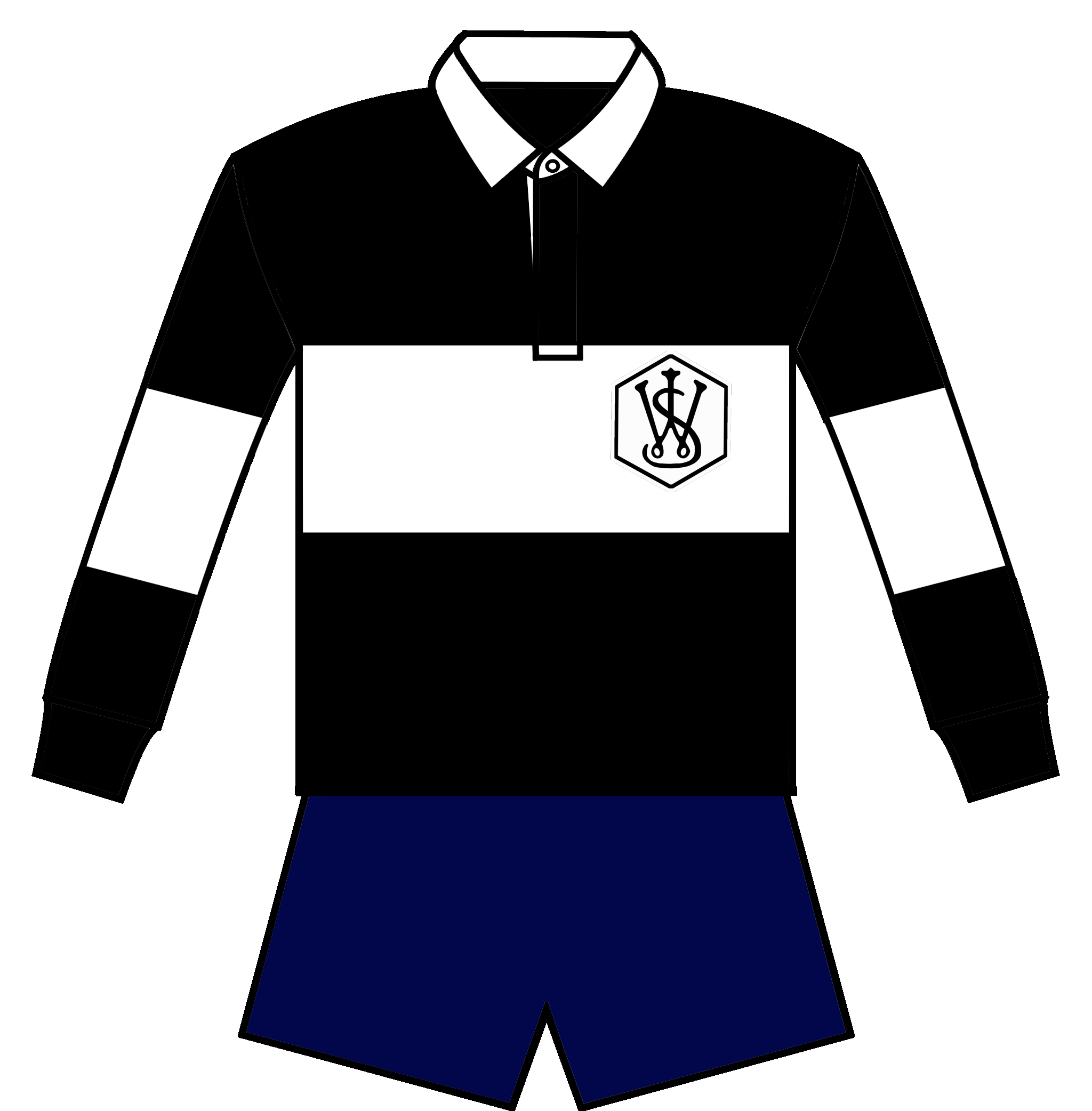
Western Suburbs 26th season Ground: Pratten Park; Captain-Coach: Bill Brogan

=== Ladder ===
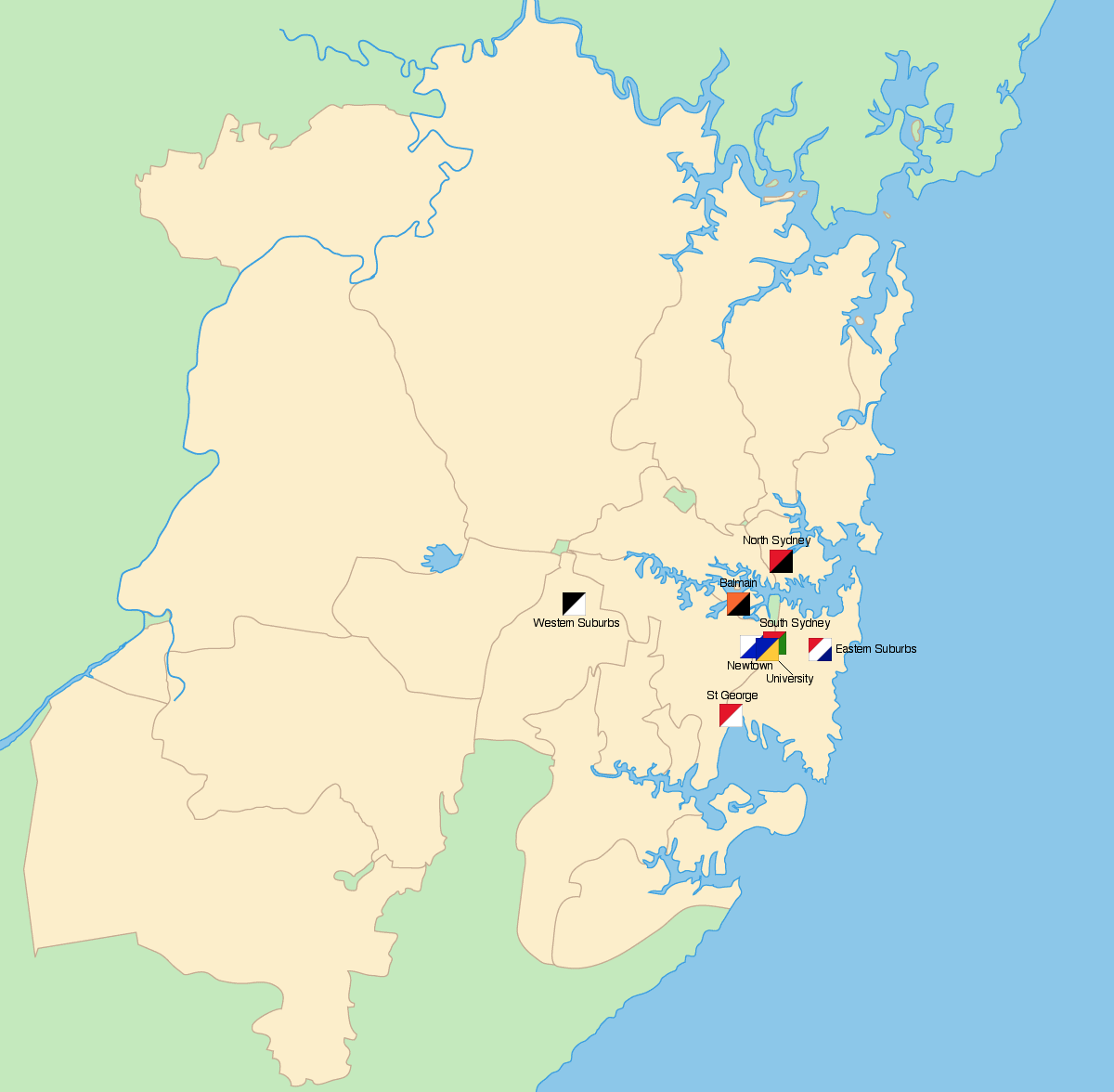
The geographical locations of the teams that contested the 1933 premiership across Sydney.

	Team	Pld	W	D	L	PF	PA	PD	Pts
1	Newtown	14	9	0	5	183	125	+58	18
2	Eastern Suburbs	14	8	1	5	224	169	+55	17
3	South Sydney	14	8	1	5	182	177	+5	17
4	St. George	14	8	0	6	165	174	-9	16
5	Balmain	14	5	3	6	187	210	-23	13
6	Sydney University	14	5	1	8	218	216	+2	11
7	North Sydney	14	5	1	8	136	188	-52	11
8	Western Suburbs	14	4	1	9	210	246	-36	9

== Finals ==
In the two semi finals, Newtown and St. George beat their opponents Eastern Suburbs and South Sydney. In their semi-final Newtown were reduced to twelve men after former representative fullback Alan Righton broke his leg. The two winners then advanced to the final.

Semi-finals
26 August 1933 - Sports Ground
Newtown	17
South Sydney	12
2 September 1933 - Sports Ground
St. George	13
Eastern Suburbs	10

Final
9 September 1933 - Sports Ground
Newtown	18
St. George	5

=== Premiership final ===
Newtown	Position	St. George
13. Tom Ellis	FB	13. Stan Robinson
25. Joe Gartner	WG	11. Bernie Martin
11. Alf Griffiths	CE	51. Max Hollingsworth
20. Frank Gilmore	CE	14. Norm Tipping
21. Garnet Braybrook	WG	8. Len Brennan
8. Keith Ellis (c)	FE	7. Mick Kadwell (Ca./Co.)
7. Hans Mork	HB	34. Dick Daly
15. Clarrie Tupper	PR	41. Tom Haywood
3. Clarrie Stevenson	HK	5. Percy Fairall
18. Henry Porter	PR	43. Alan Sprouster
5. Alf Smith	SR	31. Allan Woods
28. Les Bull	SR	2. Jim Rutherford
6. Jack Thornton	LK	30. Bill Killiby
Charles Russell	Coach	

The Sydney Sports Ground attracted a large crowd of 18,080 on 9 September to see Newtown take on St George. Both teams were coached by former internationals. St George captain-coach was former Kangaroo and premiership winner with South Sydney Harry 'Mick' Kadwell. Newtown were coached by former dual-international Charles “Boxer” Russell.

The match, refereed by William Fry, was level 5–all at halftime, before the Bluebags finished the stronger to take the premiership.

Newtown 18 (Tries: Alf Griffiths 2, Joe Gartner, George Braybrook. Goals: Frank Gilmore 3)

beat

St George 5 (Tries: Percy Fairall. Goal: Mick Kadwell )
