= Timothy Barnes =

Timothy or Tim Barnes may refer to:

- Timothy Barnes (classicist) (born 1942), British classicist
- Timothy Barnes, 4th Baron Gorell (1927–2007), British businessman
- Tim Barnes (politician) (born 1958), member of the Tennessee Senate
- Tim Barnes (American football) (born 1988), American football player
- Tim Barnes (rugby league) (born 1961), Australian rugby league player
