= Shumack =

Shumack is a surname. Notable people with the surname include:

- Andrew Shumack, American journalist
- Jack Shumack (1904–1974), Australian rugby league footballer
- Samuel Shumack (1850–1940), Australian pioneer and author
