= Robert Madden =

Robert Madden may refer to:

- Bobby Madden (born 1978), Scottish football referee
- Bobby Madden (cricketer) (1928–2008), Australian cricketer
- Robert Bruce Madden (born 1944), Kansas state legislator
- Robert P. Madden (1928–2014), president of the Optical Society of America in 1982
- Robert W. Madden, staff photographer for National Geographic magazine
