= McGreal =

McGreal is a surname. Notable people with the surname include:

- Brian McGreal (1935–2007), Australian rugby league player
- Chris McGreal, British journalist
- John McGreal (born 1972), English footballer
