= Roley =

Roley is both a given name and a surname. Tracey Hammett

Notable people with the given name include:

- Roley Williams (1927–1999), Welsh professional footballer
- Roley Young, Australian rugby league footballer

Fictional characters with the given name include:

- Roley, a character from the British children's series Bob the Builder
- Roley, character from Dot in Space

People with the surname include:

- V. Vance Roley, Dean of the Shidler College of Business at the University of Hawaii
