= Harry Kadwell =

Australian RL coach and former Australia international rugby league footballer

Personal information
- Full name: Henry James Kadwell
- Born: 29 May 1902 Redfern, New South Wales, Australia
- Died: 27 October 1999 (aged 97) Avalon, New South Wales, Australia

Playing information
- Position: Fullback, Halfback
Club
Years	Team	Pld	T	G	FG	P
1927–30	South Sydney	40	14	16	0	74
1931–34	St. George	46	8	61	0	146
	Total	86	22	77	0	220
Representative
Years	Team	Pld	T	G	FG	P
1928–34	New South Wales	8	2	12	0	30
1929–30	Australia	0	0	0	0	0

Coaching information
Club
Years	Team	Gms	W	D	L	W%
1931–32	St George	29	12	1	16	41
- Relatives: Jack Kadwell (brother)

Henry James Kadwell (29 May 1902 – 27 October 1999) was an Australian professional rugby league footballer who played in the 1920s and 1930s. An Australian international and New South Wales interstate representative fullback who later moved to the-halves, he played his club football for South Sydney with whom he won the 1927 and 1928 NSWRFL premierships, and later St. George whom he captain-coached to the 1933 grand final.

== Playing career ==
=== South Sydney ===
A South Sydney junior from the Redfern United Club, Kadwell first played for the Rabbitohs in the first grade NSWRFL premiership in 1927. At the end of his first season he played at fullback in Souths' win over Western Suburbs in the grand final. The following year he was first selected in the New South Wales rugby league team and again won a premiership with Souths, this time playing at five-eighth and scoring two tries. In 1929 Kadwell moved to halfback and was selected in this position for the 1929–30 Kangaroo tour of Great Britain, becoming Kangaroo No. 163. On the tour he played in eight matches, but no tests. Following the residential qualification rules of the time, Kadwell was forced to leave Souths in 1930.

=== St. George ===
Kadwell became St. George's captain-coach for the 1931 NSWRFL season and was also the club's top point scorer in first grade. While representing New South Wales against England early in the 1932 season, Kadwell broke his leg. ending his season and Arthur 'Snowy' Justice took over as St. George captain (and would later become coach and secretary of the club).

Kadwell returned in 1933 as St. George captain (with 'Ricketty' Johnston taking over as coach) to guide Saints to the 1933 premiership-deciding final, (lost 18–5 to Newtown) and was again the St. George club's top point-scorer. He was again captain in the 1934 NSWRFL season, his final season, earning selection for New South Wales once more and was again the St. George club's top point-scorer.

== Post-playing career ==
After retirement, Kadwell helped the St. George club as a lower grade coach and selector. On 7 February 1945 he was selected by the club's committee to replace Bill Kelly as first-grade coach, although Percy Williams later shared the position.

At the time of his death in 1999, Kadwell was the oldest living Australian Kangaroos player, and the last surviving member of the 1929-30 Kangaroo Tour.
