= Dick Daley =

Australian rugby league footballer

Dick Daly
Personal information
- Full name: Richard Francis Daly
- Born: 20 May 1910; Waterloo, New South Wales, Australia
- Died: 10 July 1984 (aged 74); Ramsgate, New South Wales, Australia

Playing information
- Position: Halfback, Five-eighth
Club
Years	Team	Pld	T	G	FG	P
1933–34	St. George	6	0	0	0	0

Richard Francis Daly (1910–1984) was an Australian rugby league footballer who played in the 1930s.

Dick Daly was a Kogarah local junior who played two first grade seasons with St. George between 1933 and 1934. He played half-back in the 1933 Grand Final. His surname has been misspelt in many publications over the years as Daley.

Daly died on 10 July 1984 at Ramsgate, New South Wales, aged 74.
