= Max Hollingsworth =

Australian rugby league footballer

- Max Hollingsworth 1933

Personal information
- Full name: Max Hollingsworth
- Born: 22 October 1913 Yass, New South Wales, Australia
- Died: 11 August 1968 (aged 54) Beverly Hills, New South Wales, Australia

Playing information
- Position: Centre
Club
Years	Team	Pld	T	G	FG	P
1933–35	St. George	19	7	0	0	21

Max Hollingsworth (22 October 1913 – 11 August 1968) was an Australian rugby league footballer who played in the 1930s.

== Background ==
Hollingsworth was born in Yass, New South Wales on 22 October 1913 and lived his early life in Armidale.

== Playing career ==
He came to St. George for three seasons between 1933 and 1935, the highlight probably being a member of the St. George team that played in the 1933 Final.

He played centre in the 1933 decider that was won by Newtown 18–5. He also scored four tries in St George's biggest ever win. This happened in a match against newcomers Canterbury-Bankstown in Round 5 1935 at Earl Park, Arncliffe, the final score was 91–6. As of the 2023 NRL season, this remains the biggest recorded victory by a team and the biggest winning margin.

== Death ==
Hollingsworth died at his Beverly Hills, New South Wales home on 11 August 1968, aged 54.
