= Lurline Hook =

Australian diver (1915–1986)

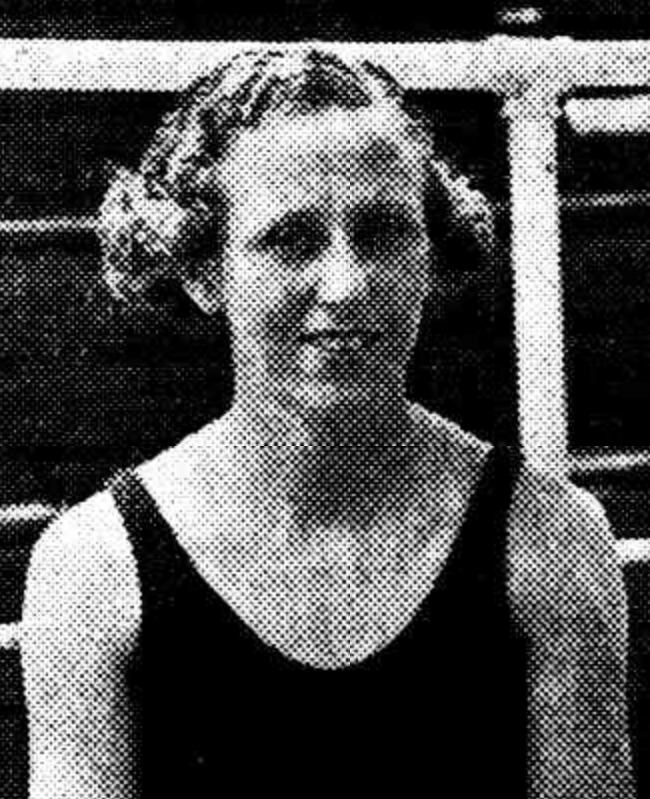
- Hook in 1938

Personal information
- Born: Lurline Elsie Hook; 1915 Hay, New South Wales, Australia
- Died: 11 March 1986 (aged 70–71) Ballina, New South Wales, Australia
- Spouses: Hylton Davies (m. 1939; died 1945) Loyal George Cavanagh (m. 1947)

Sport
- Country: Australia
Medal record
Diving
Representing Australia
British Empire Games
Gold medal – first place	1938 Sydney	10 Metres Platform

Lurline Elsie Hook (1915 – 11 March 1986) was an Australian diver who won a gold medal at the 1938 British Empire Games. She was Australian springboard champion in 1931 and six times New South Wales diving champion.

Born in Hay, New South Wales in 1915, Hook moved with her family to Lismore in the State's north-east, where she received a certificate from the Lismore Ladies' Life Saving and Swimming Club in 1924 for completing 50 and 100 yard swims.

In 1926 Hook won the title of Queen of the Olde English Fayre, raising over £102 for the church she represented, St Luke's, Lismore and enabling repayment of a loan for its construction.

At her first attempt, Hook placed third in the NSW junior diving championships in 1929 and fourth in the senior event. In the 1930 NSW championships she was injured and unable to perform up to expectation.

Hook won her first Australian national diving championship in 1931, winning the springboard event in Brisbane at age 15. It was the first time a country girl had won.

She won gold in the 10 metre platform event at the 1938 British Empire Games in Sydney.

Hook met her first husband, Hylton Davies at the 1931 championships. They married before he joined the AIF shortly the outbreak of WWII. He was killed in Borneo in July 1945. She married Loyal George Cavanagh in 1947.

Hook died in Ballina, New South Wales on 11 March 1986.
