= Allan Woods =

Australian rugby league footballer

Personal information
- Full name: Allan Jack Woods
- Born: 20 July 1906 Manly, New South Wales, Australia
- Died: 4 April 1968 (aged 61) Sans Souci, New South Wales, Australia

Playing information
- Height: 6 ft 3 in (191 cm)c
- Weight: 15 st 6 lb (216 lb; 98 kg)
- Position: Second-row
Club
Years	Team	Pld	T	G	FG	P
1930–33	St George Dragons	13	1	0	0	3
- Source: Whiticker/Hudson

Allan Jack 'Stumpy' Woods (1906–1968) was an Australian rugby league footballer who played during the 1930s.

== Career ==
Allan Woods was born in Manly, New South Wales, on 20 July 1906. He is remembered as a second-row forward who played for the St George Dragons for three seasons, between 1930 and 1933, including his appearance in the 1933 Grand Final. Woods retired from rugby league following that match.

== War service ==
Stumpy Woods was also a World War II veteran, enlisting in 1941. He joined the 28th Australian Works Company, and attained the rank of Sergeant.

Allan 'Stumpy' Woods died on 4 April 1968, at the aged of 61.
