= Alf Smith (rugby league) =

Australian rugby league footballer

Personal information
- Full name: Alfred Allan Smith
- Born: 29 December 1915 Annandale, New South Wales, Australia
- Died: 18 August 1995 (aged 79) Bulli, New South Wales, Australia

Playing information
- Position: Prop, Second-row
Club
Years	Team	Pld	T	G	FG	P
1931–33	Newtown	28	7	0	0	21
Representative
Years	Team	Pld	T	G	FG	P
1937	NSW Country	1	0	0	0	0

Alf Smith (1915–1995) was an Australian rugby league footballer who played in the 1930s for Newtown in the NSWRL competition.

== Playing career ==
Smith made his first grade debut in Round 10 1930 against North Sydney at Marrickville Oval. Smith made a total of 12 appearances in his first 2 seasons at Newtown but missed the entire 1932 season.

In 1933, Newtown finished as minor premiers and reached the grand final. Smith played for Newtown in the 1933 NSWRL grand final against St George at the Sydney Sports Ground. Newtown would win the match 18-5 claiming its second premiership in front of 18,080 spectators.

This would Smith's final game for Newtown and his last in the NSWRL competition. In 1934, Smith began playing in the local country leagues and in 1937 was selected to play for NSW Country against NSW City.
