= Ron Madden =

Australian rugby league footballer

Personal information
- Full name: Ronald Francis Madden
- Born: 28 December 1923 Sydney, New South Wales, Australia
- Died: 26 July 2012 (aged 88) Erskineville, New South Wales

Playing information
- Position: Five-eighth
Club
Years	Team	Pld	T	G	FG	P
1949	Newtown	18	3	0	0	9
- Relatives: Bob Madden (brother)

Ron Madden (1923-2012) was an Australian rugby league footballer who played in the 1940s.

Madden came from a sporting family from Camperdown, New South Wales, his brother Bob Madden was a state cricketer and star soccer player.

Ron Madden was also a multi-talented sportsman who played A grade cricket and soccer for the Petersham Club. He tried out for Newtown in 1949 and was graded. In his only season in the NSWRFL, Ron Madden was used in many different positions in the Newtown backline and most of the season with a broken wrist.

At the end of the 1949 season, Ron Madden went to the country to successfully captain/coach Canberra in 1950, Goulburm in 1951, Inverell in 1952-1953 and Armidale in 1954.

Madden died on 26 July 2012 at Erskineville, New South Wales age 88.
