= Doug Kemister =

Australian rugby league footballer

Personal information
- Full name: Doug Kemister
- Born: 1945 (age 79–80); Newtown, New South Wales, Australia

Playing information
- Position: Hooker
Club
Years	Team	Pld	T	G	FG	P
1968–76	Newtown	109	2	0	0	6

Doug Kemister is an Australian former professional rugby league footballer who played in the 1960s and 1970s, playing his entire career for Newtown in the NSWRL competition.

== Playing career ==
Kemister began his first grade career for Newtown in 1968. In the same year, Newtown finished last on the table and claimed the wooden spoon. In 1970, Newtown won the post season Endeavour Cup competition defeating Balmain Tigers in the final with Kemister playing at hooker. In 1973, Newtown announced Jack Gibson as the club's new coach and he managed to turn the side's fortunes around as they qualified for the finals. Kemister played in all of Newtown's finals matches as the club reached the preliminary final before being defeated by Cronulla-Sutherland.

After Gibson left the club at the end of 1973, Newtown were unable to qualify for the finals again over the following years. Kemister left Newtown at the end of 1976 as the club finished last on the table. In total, Kemister played 147 games for Newtown across all grades. After leaving Newtown, Kemister joined Central Charlestown in the local Newcastle competition and played there for a few seasons before retiring.

== Post playing ==
In 1994, Underworld identity Neddy Smith was heard on police recordings implicating Kemister on at least 6 murders stretching back to the 1970s. Smith told a fellow cellmate that Kemister was the driver and shooter in the murders. It was later revealed that Smith had made the entire story up and Kemister was innocent.
