= Patrick McCue =

Australia dual-code rugby international footballer & Olympian

Paddy McCue
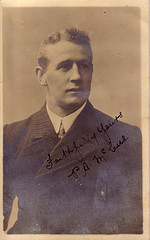
- McCue, c. 1908
- Born: Patrick Aloysius McCue; 24 June 1883 Sydney, New South Wales
- Died: 7 September 1962 (aged 79) Cronulla, New South Wales
- Notable relative: Jim McCue (brother)

Rugby union career
- Position: lock
Amateur team(s)
Years	Team	Apps	(Points)
- Newtown RUFC
International career
Years	Team	Apps	(Points)
1907–08	Wallabies	4	(0)
- Rugby league career

Playing information
- Position: Second-row
Club
Years	Team	Pld	T	G	FG	P
1910–12	Newtown	44	15	1	0	47
1913	Annandale	1	0	0	0	0
1913–14	Newtown	38	15	9	0	61
1919	Western Suburbs	1	0	0	0	0
	Total	84	30	10	0	108
Representative
Years	Team	Pld	T	G	FG	P
1910–14	Metropolis	3	2	0	0	6
1911–12	New South Wales	2				6
1911–14	Australia	4				6
Medal record
Men's rugby union
Representing Australasia
Olympic Games
Gold medal – first place	1908 London	Team competition

Patrick Aloysius McCue (24 June 1883 – 10 September 1962) was an Australian representative rugby union player and pioneer rugby league footballer. He was a dual-code rugby international and an Olympic gold medallist.

== Rugby union career ==
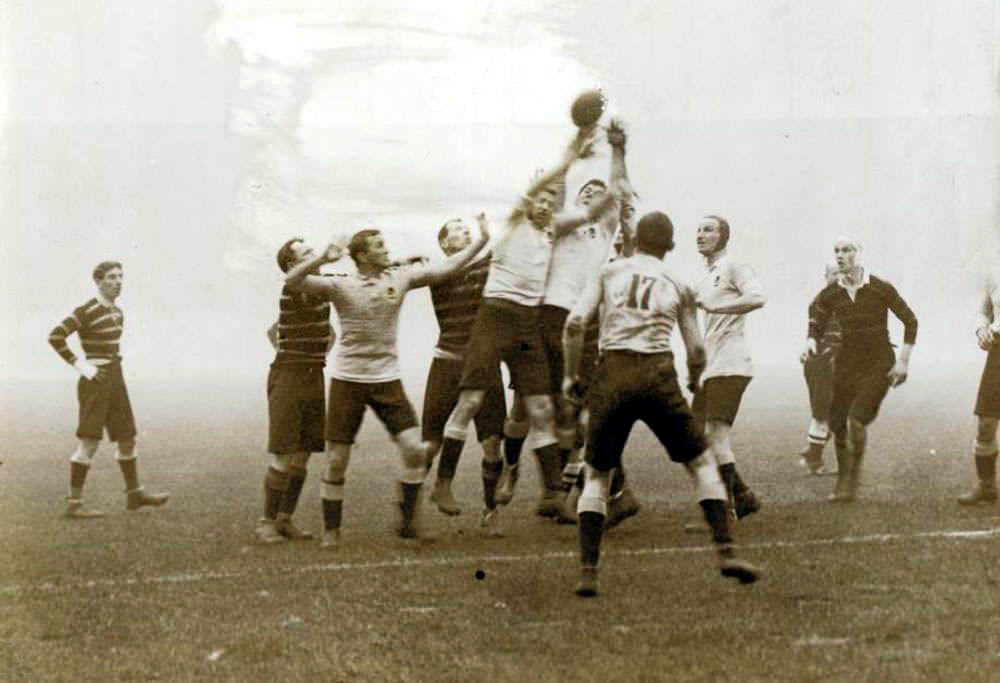
1908 Olympic Gold Final Wallabies v Cornwall

A forward with the Newtown Rugby Union club in Sydney, McCue was selected on the first Wallaby tour of England in 1908–1909, the squad captained by Herbert Moran. That side competed in the 1908 Summer Olympics in London, and McCue was a member of the Australia national rugby union team captained by Chris McKivat, which won the gold medal. Paddy McCue also coached the St. George Rugby Union Club in the 1930s.

== Rugby league club career ==
Along with fourteen of his Olympic Wallaby teammates, on his return to Australia, he negotiated to take part in promotional matches against the Pioneer Kangaroos. He was promptly banned from the amateur code by the Metropolitan Rugby Union. McCue and a number of the rebels joined the Newtown club in Sydney in 1910. They included gold medallist Wallabies John "Jumbo" Barnett and Charles "Boxer" Russell. He helped the club win premiership honours that year, playing at second-row forward in the 1910 NSWRFL season's final.

McCue played seven seasons with Newtown and after retiring as a player was assistant coach of the University club in its inaugural first grade season of 1920. He later returned to rugby union, coaching the University rugby union team in seasons 1926, 1927, 1932, 1935, 1942, 1943 and 1944. Paddy McCue was the elder brother of Jim McCue, who also played with Newtown between 1911 and 1919.

In 2008, the centenary year of rugby league in Australia, McCue was named in the Newtown Jets 18-man team of the century.

== Rugby league representative career ==
McCue was selected to represent New South Wales in 1911 and later led New South Wales as captain on the 1912-13 tour of New Zealand.

He was selected on the 1911–12 Kangaroo tour of Great Britain, which was an Australasian squad including four New Zealanders. McCue made his international rugby league debut in the first test of 1911 at Newcastle upon Tyne and played in all three tests of the series, as well as in twenty other minor tour matches, scoring seven tries all told on the tour. His final international appearance was in the first test of the 1914 domestic Ashes series.

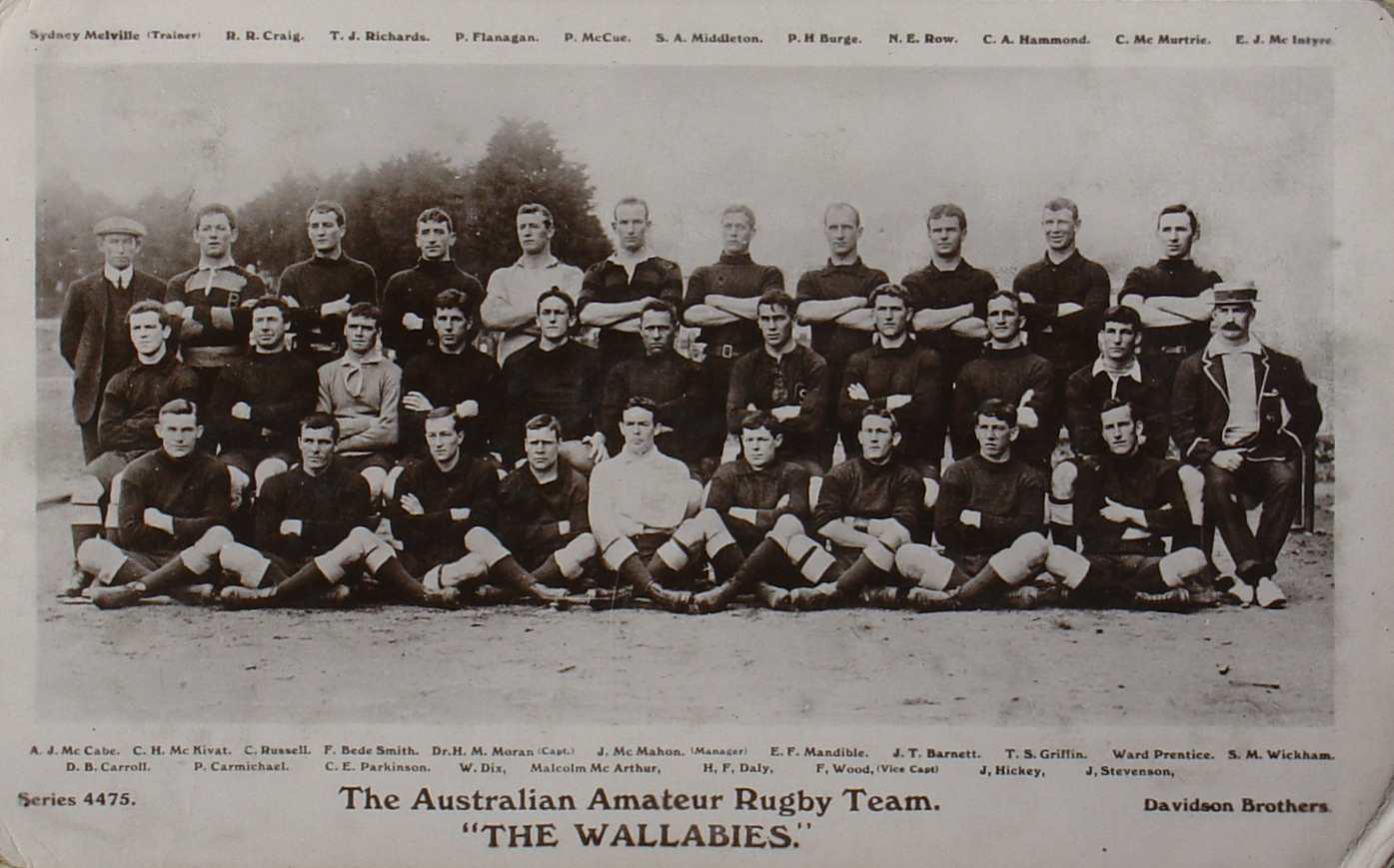
McCue back row 5th from left, with the 1908 Wallaby tour squad

== See also ==
- Rugby union at the 1908 Summer Olympics
