= Hylton Davies =

Australian rugby league footballer

Personal information
- Full name: Hylton George Leslie Davies
- Born: 28 December 1915 Sydney, New South Wales, Australia
- Died: 16 July 1945 (aged 29) Balikpapan, Borneo, Dutch East Indies

Playing information
- Position: Wing
Club
Years	Team	Pld	T	G	FG	P
1936–39	Newtown	22	1	0	0	3
Representative
Years	Team	Pld	T	G	FG	P
1936	Metropolis	1	0	0	0	0
- Military career
- Allegiance: Australia
- Branch: Australian Army
- Service years: 1939-1945
- Rank: Captain
- Unit: Second Australian Imperial Force
- Conflicts: World War II; Syria–Lebanon campaign; Kokoda Track campaign; Borneo campaign; Battle of Balikpapan
- Spouse: Lurline Hook (m. 1939)
- Relatives: Jack Davies (brother)

Hylton George Leslie "Heck" Davies (1915-1945) was an Australian AIF officer who fell in WWII during the Battle of Balikpapan. He had been a top-grade rugby league footballer who played for Newtown in the NSWRFL in the 1930s.

== Rugby career ==
Davies played four seasons of first grade for Newtown between 1936 and 1939 before his war service.

== Military service ==
Davies enlisted in the AIF in late 1939 and didn't play rugby league again. He attained the rank of captain in the Australian Army and he served in Great Britain, Syria, The Middle East, Kokoda Track, Lae and Borneo.

Hylton Davies was killed during the Battle of Balikpapan in 1945 when a Japanese mortar shell hit Davies' battalion's headquarters.

== Personal ==
Davies married Lurline Hook, diving gold medallist at the 1938 Empire Games. She and their son, Ian, survived him.
