= William van Rugge =

Australian rugby league footballer

Personal information
- Full name: William Christian van Rugge
- Born: 4 May 1921; Petersham, New South Wales, Australia
- Died: 5 July 1997 (aged 76); Newcastle, New South Wales, Australia

Playing information
- Position: Wing
Club
Years	Team	Pld	T	G	FG	P
1942	Newtown	1	0	0	0	0

William Christian van Rugge (1921-1997) was an Australian rugby league footballer who played in the 1940s.

== Playing career ==
A Newtown junior, Bill van Rugge's career was cut short by war service in the Australian Army during World War II. In 1944 Van Rugge played for a combined-Brisbane team v's Ipswich in the Bulimba Cup before war service in New Guinea later that year. By war's end, his rugby league career was over.

== Death ==
Van Rugge died on 5 July 1997 in Newcastle, New South Wales aged 76.
