= Clarrie Stevenson =

Australian rugby league footballer

Personal information
- Full name: Clarence Victor Stevenson
- Born: 4 December 1910 Waterloo, New South Wales, Australia
- Died: 28 May 1984 (aged 73) Newtown, New South Wales, Australia

Playing information
- Position: Hooker, Second-row
Club
Years	Team	Pld	T	G	FG	P
1932–35	Newtown	34	2	0	0	6
Representative
Years	Team	Pld	T	G	FG	P
1933–34	NSW City	2	0	0	0	0

Clarence Stevenson (1910–1984) was an Australian rugby league footballer who played in the 1930s. A forward for the Newtown club, he helped them win the 1933 NSWRFL Premiership.

== Background ==
Stevenson was born in Sydney on 4 December 1910.

== Playing career ==
A local junior, he played for Newtown in the 1930s. Stevenson played for City in the hooking role in 1933. He won a premiership with Newtown later that year when he played hooker in the 1933 Grand Final.

Stevenson played in the grand final as a replacement for Arthur Folwell, who had since departed on the 1933–34 Kangaroo tour. Stevenson retired after the conclusion of the 1935 NSWRFL season. Clarrie Stevenson died in Sydney on 28 May 1984 aged 73.
