= Les Bull =

Australian rugby league footballer

Personal information
- Full name: Leslie William Bull
- Born: 18 January 1901 Newtown, New South Wales, Australia
- Died: 15 April 1973 (aged 72) Tempe, New South Wales, Australia

Playing information
- Position: Second-row
Club
Years	Team	Pld	T	G	FG	P
1924–34	Newtown	126	22	0	0	66
Representative
Years	Team	Pld	T	G	FG	P
1926	New South Wales	1	0	0	0	0

Leslie William Bull (18 January 1901 – 15 April 1973) was an Australian rugby league footballer who played in the 1920s and 1930s.

== Background ==
Bull was born to parents William and Alice Bull (née Johnson) in Newtown, New South Wales in 1901.

== Playing career ==
Bull played his junior football with the Tempe JRLFC and Sydenham JRLFC and was graded at Newtown in 1921.

He was selected for first grade in 1924 and played eleven seasons with the club before retiring in 1934. He represented New South Wales on one occasion in 1926.

Bull won a premiership with Newtown in 1933 and retired at the end of the following season. He was awarded Life Membership of Newtown RLFC in his last season in 1934 for outstanding service to the club. He continued a strong association with Newtown until his death.

Bull died at his Tempe, New South Wales home on 15 April 1973, aged 72.
