= Bobby Madden (cricketer) =

Australian cricketer

Personal information
- Full name: Robert Harold Madden
- Born: 12 December 1928; Sydney, Australia
- Died: 21 January 2008 (aged 79); Sydney, Australia
- Relatives: Ron Madden (brother)
- Source: ESPNcricinfo, 6 January 2017

Bobby Madden (12 December 1928 – 21 January 2008) was an Australian cricketer. He played seven first-class matches for New South Wales between 1949/50 and 1959/60. He also played for Petersham and Glebe. He also played soccer.

== See also ==
- List of New South Wales representative cricketers
