= Clarrie Tupper =

Australian rugby league footballer

- Clarrie Tupper. 1933

Personal information
- Full name: Clarence William Tupper
- Born: 5 March 1908 Coonamble, New South Wales, Australia
- Died: 26 December 1985 (aged 77) Cronulla, New South Wales, Australia

Playing information
- Position: Prop
Club
Years	Team	Pld	T	G	FG	P
1933–36	Newtown	31	3	0	0	9

Clarence William "Clarrie" Tupper (1908–1985) was an Australian rugby league footballer who played in the 1930s.

== Playing career ==
Clarrie Tupper played three seasons with Newtown between 1933 and 1936. A front row forward, formerly from St. George rugby, Tupper won a premiership with Newtown, playing in the 1933 Grand Final winning team.

After being banned during 1935 due to the residential qualification rules of the time, Tupper refused the NSWRFL request that he transfer to the new Canterbury-Bankstown rugby league team. Tupper refused to leave Newtown and sat out the 1935 season, and although he was still listed at Newtown for 1936, he did not play rugby league again.

== Death ==
Tupper died on 26 December 1985 aged 77.
