= Jack Kadwell =

Australian rugby league footballer

Personal information
- Full name: William John Kadwell
- Born: 20 December 1918; Arncliffe, New South Wales, Australia
- Died: 3 December 2007 (aged 88); Picnic Point, New South Wales

Playing information
- Position: Halfback, Five-eighth
Club
Years	Team	Pld	T	G	FG	P
1938–40	South Sydney	26	1	0	0	3
1941–45	Newtown	48	5	0	0	15
	Total	74	6	0	0	18
- Relatives: Harry Kadwell (brother)

Jack Kadwell (1918−2008) was an Australian professional rugby league footballer who played in the 1930s and 1940s for South Sydney and Newtown as a halfback and occasionally as a five-eighth.

== Playing career ==
Kadwell was a St George junior but made his first grade debut for South Sydney in Round 14 of the 1938 season. In 1939, Kadwell played at five-eighth for Souths in the heavy grand final defeat byBalmain 33–4. In 1941, Kadwell joined Newtown but missed out on the 1943 grand final victory over North Sydney due to injury. In 1944, Newtown finished as minor premiers and played against Balmain in the grand final with Kadwell playing at halfback. Newtown lost the match 19-16 but as they finished first on the table at the end of the regular season, they were allowed to challenge for a rematch. The following week, Balmain defeated Newtown once more by a score of 12–8. Kadwell played one more season for Newtown and retired at the end of 1945.
