= Wally Collins =

Australian rugby league footballer (1889-1971)

Personal information
- Full name: Walter Norman Collins
- Born: 10 August 1889 Marrickville, New South Wales, Australia
- Died: 10 September 1971 (aged 82)

Playing information
- Position: Wing
Club
Years	Team	Pld	T	G	FG	P
1912–17	Newtown	69	26	2	0	82
1918–24	Western Suburbs	100	64	0	0	192
	Total	169	90	2	0	274
Representative
Years	Team	Pld	T	G	FG	P
1914	Metropolis	1	2	0	0	6
- Source: As of 4 July 2019

Wally Collins was an Australian professional rugby league footballer who played in the 1910s and 1920s. He played for Western Suburbs and Newtown in the New South Wales Rugby League (NSWRL) competition.

== Playing career ==
Collins made his first grade debut for Newtown against North Sydney in Round 7 1912 at Erskineville Oval, Sydney scoring 2 tries in a 33–5 victory. Collins was part of the Newtown sides that finished runners up in the competition in 1913 and 1914 during the period where the first past the post rule applied.

In 1918, Collins joined Western Suburbs and finished as the club's top try scorer in both 1918 and 1919 with Wests finishing as runners up on both occasions as well. Towards the end of his career, Collins finished as top try scorer for Wests in 1923 and 1924. In Round 5 1924, Collins scored 4 tries against Glebe at Pratten Park. Collins final game before retirement was in Round 9 1924 against Eastern Suburbs where he scored a try in a 18–5 victory at Pratten Park.
