= Garnet Braybrook =

Australian rugby league footballer

Garnet Braybook
Personal information
- Full name: Bramwell Garnet Braybook
- Born: 14 January 1910 Glebe, New South Wales, Australia
- Died: 5 November 1975 (aged 65) Sydney, New South Wales, Australia

Playing information
- Position: Wing
Club
Years	Team	Pld	T	G	FG	P
1933–38	Newtown	31	21	11	0	85
Representative
Years	Team	Pld	T	G	FG	P
1936	Metropolis	1	0	0	0	0

Bramwell Garnet 'George' Braybrook (1910–1975) was an Australian rugby league footballer who played in the 1930s.

== Playing career ==
Garnet Braybrook, sometimes known as George Braybrook played for the Newtown rugby league club for 5 seasons between 1933-1934 and 1936–1938. He won a premiership when played on the wing in the 1933 Grand Final win over St. George. He was the father of former NSWRFL referee, Denis Braybrook. Braybrook was a Newtown stalwart and an active supporter of the club during his lifetime.

== Death ==
Braybrook died on 5 November 1975 aged 65.
