= Jim McCue =

Australian rugby league footballer

Personal information
- Full name: James Vincent McCue
- Born: 19 April 1889 Marrickville, New South Wales
- Died: 13 December 1971 (aged 82) Burwood, New South Wales

Playing information
- Position: Second-row
Club
Years	Team	Pld	T	G	FG	P
1911–19	Newtown	69	6	0	0	18
- Relatives: Paddy McCue (brother)

Jim McCue (1889-1971) was an Australian rugby league footballer who played in the 1910s.

A Newtown junior player, McCue was a second row forward in the early years of the NSWRFL. He played nine seasons with Newtown before retiring aged 30 in 1919. McCue was a younger brother of the legendary Paddy McCue.

== Death ==
McCue died on 13 December 1971, age 82.
