= Geoff Coburn =

Australian rugby league footballer

Personal information
- Full name: Geoff Coburn
- Born: 27 November 1958 (age 66); Newcastle, New South Wales, Australia

Playing information
- Position: Prop
Club
Years	Team	Pld	T	G	FG	P
1981	Parramatta Eels	20	0	0	0	0
1983	Newtown Jets	12	0	0	0	0
	Total	32	0	0	0	0
- Source: As of 3 June 2019

Geoff Coburn is an Australian former rugby league footballer who played in the 1980s. He played for the Newtown Jets and the Parramatta Eels in the New South Wales Rugby League (NSWRL) competition.

== Background ==
Coburn played for Western Suburbs Rosellas in the Newcastle competition and won the Newcastle Rugby League grand final in 1980 with the club before signing with Parramatta.

== Playing career ==
Coburn made his first grade debut for Parramatta against South Sydney in Round 3 1981 at Redfern Oval with Parramatta winning 39–5. Coburn played in the minor semi final victory over Eastern Suburbs but wasn't selected to play in the club's inaugural premiership victory against Newtown. In 1982, Coburn made 14 appearances for Parramatta but missed out on selection in the 1982 NSWRL grand final which Parramatta won defeating Manly in the decider.

In 1983, Coburn joined Newtown. Coburn played 12 games for Newtown in 1983 which would prove to be the club's last in the top grade of Australian rugby league. Coburn played in Newtown's final ever match in the NSWRL premiership, a 9–6 victory over the Canberra Raiders at Campbelltown Stadium.

After Newtown's ejection from the premiership due to financial reasons, Coburn returned to the Western Suburbs Rosellas. In 1988, Coburn played reserve grade for the newly admitted Newcastle Knights side before retiring.

== Post playing ==
In 2018, Coburn was announced as the acting chairman for Newcastle at official NRL functions after being appointed head of the club's new football committee.
