= Allan Ellis (rugby league) =

Australian RL coach and former rugby league footballer

Personal information
- Full name: Charles Allan Ellis
- Born: 7 May 1909 Marrickville, New South Wales
- Died: 23 September 1984 (aged 75) Marrickville, New South Wales

Playing information
Club
Years	Team	Pld	T	G	FG	P
1935–40	Newtown	59	14	80	0	202

Coaching information
Club
Years	Team	Gms	W	D	L	W%
1962–65	Newtown	72	37	4	31	51
- Relatives: Greg Ellis (son); Tom Ellis (brother); Keith Ellis (brother)

Charles Allan Ellis (1909–1984) was an Australian rugby league footballer who played in the 1930s and 1940s.

== Background ==
Ellis was born in Marrickville, New South Wales on 7 May 1909.

== Playing career ==
Ellis joined the Newtown club, playing six first grade seasons with the club between 1935 and 1940. He also captained the club in his final seasons.

He is the brother of two other Newtown legends; Keith Ellis and Tom Ellis.

== Coaching career ==
As his brothers did before him, Ellis coached the lower grades at Newtown for many years, including winning a third grade premiership in 1943. He later coached the first grade team between 1962 and 1965. His son, Greg Ellis, also played first grade with the Newtown in the 1950s and 1960s.

Ellis died on 23 September 1984, aged 75.
