= Tom Ellis (rugby league) =

Australian rugby league footballer

Personal information
- Full name: Thomas Charles Ellis
- Born: 11 March 1904; Balmain, New South Wales, Australia
- Died: 23 May 1995 (aged 91); Punchbowl, New South Wales, Australia

Playing information
- Position: Fullback
Club
Years	Team	Pld	T	G	FG	P
1923–33	Newtown	135	9	276	0	579
Representative
Years	Team	Pld	T	G	FG	P
1928	New South Wales	1	0	0	0	0
- Relatives: Greg Ellis (nephew); Allan Ellis (brother); Keith Ellis (brother)

Thomas Charles Ellis (1904 – 1995) was an Australian rugby league footballer who played in the 1920s and 1930s.

== Background ==
Ellis was born at Balmain South in 1904.

== Playing career ==
Ellis went on to come one of the finest players ever to represent the Newtown club. A Marrickville junior, Ellis played 11 seasons for Newtown between 1923 and 1933.

He retired after winning the 1933 Grand Final, playing fullback in the Newtown Jets premiership team. A prolific goal kicker, Tom Ellis scored over 500 points in his 144 grade career at Newtown.

His only representative appearance was in 1928, when he played one match for New South Wales.

He coached the Newtown third grade team for many years, and won the premiership with them in 1935. He was the brother of fellow Newtown legends Keith Ellis and Allan Ellis.

Tom Ellis died on 23 May 1995, aged 91.
