= Page Amos =

Australian rugby league footballer

Personal information
- Full name: Page Mintop Amos
- Born: 4 January 1893 Ultimo, New South Wales, Australia
- Died: 7 June 1950 (aged 57) Redfern, New South Wales, Australia

Playing information
- Position: Lock
Club
Years	Team	Pld	T	G	FG	P
1917–18	Newtown	3	2	0	0	6

Page Mintop Amos (1893–1950) was an Australian rugby league footballer who played in the 1910s.

A local Junior from Waterloo, New South Wales, Amos played with the Newtown club in 1917 before enlisting in the Australian Army during World War 1 in the 56th Battalion, 10th Reinforcement. He returned from active service in late 1918 and did not play first grade again.

Amos died at Redfern, New South Wales on 7 June 1950 aged 57.
