= Jim Warwick =

Australian rugby league footballer and administrator

- Jim Warwick. 1927

Personal information
- Full name: James Andrew Warwick
- Born: 4 June 1901; Rockdale, New South Wales, Australia
- Died: 25 July 1941 (aged 40); Brighton-Le-Sands, New South Wales, Australia

Playing information
- Height: 180 cm (5 ft 11 in)
- Weight: 79 kg (174 lb; 12 st 6 lb)
- Position: Prop
Club
Years	Team	Pld	T	G	FG	P
1925–26	Newtown	20	1	0	0	3
1927–29	St. George	32	10	0	0	30
	Total	52	11	0	0	33
Representative
Years	Team	Pld	T	G	FG	P
1925–27	Metropolis	2	1	0	0	3
- Source: As of 30 August 2019

James Andrew Warwick (4 June 1901 – 25 July 1941) was an Australian rugby league footballer who played in the 1920s.

== Career ==
Warwick was a prop forward and started his career at Newtown, and was graded there in 1924. He played two seasons for them before moving with his family into the St. George district at Brighton-Le-Sands, New South Wales. As per the residential rule, his new club became St. George and he gave them three years of solid service. He retired from the club at the end of the 1929 season due to a contractual payment issue that involved the club and George Carstairs.

== Death ==
Warwick died suddenly aged 40 on 25 July 1941 at Brighton-Le-Sands, New South Wales, although he had been in ill health since the previous year.

== War service ==
Warwick was a veteran of World War I, having enlisted in the AIF underage in 1918.
