= Keith Ellis (rugby league) =

Australian rugby league footballer

- Keith Ellis 1928

Personal information
- Full name: Keith Gregory Ellis
- Born: 14 December 1905 Marrickville, New South Wales, Australia
- Died: 4 June 1972 (aged 66) Marrickville, New South Wales, Australia

Playing information
- Position: Five-eighth
Club
| Years | Team | Pld | T | G | FG | P |
|---|---|---|---|---|---|---|
| 1925–35 | Newtown | 75 | 12 | 1 | 0 | 38 |
Representative
| Years | Team | Pld | T | G | FG | P |
| 1925–26 | New South Wales | 10 | 2 | 0 | 0 | 6 |
| 1928 | NSW City | 1 | 0 | 0 | 0 | 0 |
- Relatives: Greg Ellis (nephew); Allan Ellis (brother); Tom Ellis (brother)

Keith Gregory Ellis (1905–1972) was an Australian rugby league footballer who played in the 1920s and 1930s

== Background ==
Ellis was born at Marrickville, New South Wales to parents Charles and Catherine Ellis.

== Playing career ==
A Newtown junior, he was chosen to play reserve grade in 1924 and went on to play eight seasons in first grade for the Newtown Jets between 1925-1928 and 1932–1935. He is mostly remembered as the club captain the Newtown club when it won the 1933 Grand Final over St George Dragons 18–5.

His only representative appearance was for New South Wales in 1926, playing in 5 matches. He was a long term committeeman at Newtown and also successfully coached the Newtown reserve grade team to premierships in 1947 and 1948. He was the brother of fellow Newtown players Tom Ellis and Allan Ellis.

A Newtown legend, Ellis died on 4 June 1972, aged 66.
