= Greg Ellis (rugby league) =

Australian rugby league footballer

Personal information
- Full name: Gregory Allan Ellis
- Born: Marrickville, New South Wales, Australia

Playing information
- Position: Hooker
Club
Years	Team	Pld	T	G	FG	P
1955–63	Newtown	120	7	47	0	115
- Father: Allan Ellis
- Relatives: Keith Ellis (uncle); Tom Ellis (uncle)

Gregory Allan Ellis is an Australian former rugby league footballer who played in the 1950s and 1960s.

The son of club stalwart Allan Ellis, Greg Ellis also had a long and successful career at Newtown. Greg Ellis played nine seasons of rugby league with Newtown between 1955 and 1963, and was a hooker. His only grand final appearance was in the 1955 Grand Final where Newtown lost to South Sydney Rabbitohs 12–11. He went on to play 150 games for the club, 120 in first grade.
