= Jack Davies (rugby league Australia) =

Australian rugby league footballer (1909-1984)

Personal information
- Full name: Jack Davies
- Born: 8 September 1909; St Peters, New South Wales, Australia
- Died: 5 September 1984 (aged 74)

Playing information
- Position: Lock, Second-row, Prop
Club
Years	Team	Pld	T	G	FG	P
1928–38	Newtown	120	9	1	0	29
- Relatives: Hylton Davies (brother)

Jack Davies was an Australian rugby league footballer who played in the 1920s and 1930s. He played for Newtown in the New South Wales Rugby League (NSWRL) competition.

== Playing career ==
Davies made his first grade debut for Newtown against North Sydney in Round 4 1928 at North Sydney Oval. Davies made 10 appearances for Newtown in his debut year as the club finished last on the table claiming the wooden spoon after winning only one game all season.

In 1929, Newtown had a complete form reversal and finished 4th on the table. The club then went on to upset St George 8–7 at Earl Park, Arncliffe in the semi-final to reach the 1929 NSWRL grand final. In the grand final, the club's opponents were the all conquering South Sydney side who were looking to win their 5th premiership in a row. Davies played at second-row in the final as Newtown never troubled Souths losing 30–10 at the Sydney Sports Ground in front of 16,360 fans.

Over the following seasons, Davies continued to be a regular feature in the Newtown side. Davies missed the entire 1933 NSWRL season and did not play in the club's second premiership victory which was against St George. Between 1934 and 1938, Newtown failed to qualify for the finals but Davies stayed loyal to the club. Davies final game for Newtown was a 30–13 loss against South Sydney in Round 14 1938 at Henson Park ending a 10-year association with the club.
