= Herbert Chevell =

Australian rugby league footballer

Personal information
- Full name: Herbert Chevell
- Born: 31 March 1888; Newtown, New South Wales, Australia
- Died: 3 September 1960 (aged 72); Newtown, New South Wales, Australia

Playing information
- Position: Second-row
Club
Years	Team	Pld	T	G	FG	P
1908–10	Newtown	14	1	0	0	3
- Source: As of 8 August 2019

Herbert Chevell (1888-1960) was an Australian rugby league footballer who played in the 1900s and 1910s.

== Playing career ==
Chevell was a foundation player with the Newtown club in 1908, the very first year of the NSWRFL. He played three seasons at the club before retiring in 1910.

Chevell played 4 games for Newtown in 1910 but did not play in the grand finale against South Sydney which Newtown won despite drawing 4–4 at full time. Newtown were awarded the premiership due to the fact that they finished minor premiers. Chevell was also a noted Australian Rules player and a cricketer.

== Death ==
Chevell died on 3 September 1960 in Newtown, New South Wales aged 72.
