= Francis Gilmore =

Australian sportsman

Frank Gilmore
Personal information
- Full name: Francis Gilmore
- Born: 12 September 1909 Yass, New South Wales, Australia
- Died: 26 April 1955 (aged 45) Eastwood, New South Wales, Australia

Playing information
- Position: Five-eighth, Centre, Halfback
Club
Years	Team	Pld	T	G	FG	P
1931–35	Newtown	53	10	22	0	74
1937	Balmain	1	0	0	0	0
	Total	54	10	22	0	74

Francis Gilmore (12 September 1909 – 26 April 1955) was an Australian cricketer and rugby league footballer. He played two first-class cricket matches for New South Wales between 1938/39 and 1939/40, before which he competed as a first-grade rugby league player for Newtown and Balmain.

Gilmore made his first grade rugby league debut in Round 3 1931 against Balmain at Marrickville Oval. Gilmore initially started as a five-eighth at Newtown before switching to the centres for the 1933 season.

In 1933, Gilmore played for Newtown in the 1933 NSWRL grand final against St George at the Sydney Sports Ground. Newtown would win the match 18-5 claiming its second premiership with Gilmore kicking 3 goals.

Gilmore played with Newtown up until the end of 1935 before departing the club. Due to the residency rules at the time, Gilmore sat out the 1936 season before signing with Balmain in 1937. Gilmore played only a single game for Balmain before retiring at the end of 1937.

Gilmore died from stomach cancer on 26 April 1955 at the age of 45.

== See also ==
- List of New South Wales representative cricketers
