= Roy Street =

Australian rugby league footballer (1915–1959)

Personal information
- Full name: Roy George Street
- Born: 6 October 1915 Kurri Kurri, New South Wales, Australia
- Died: 26 September 1959 (aged 43)

Playing information
- Position: Hooker
Club
Years	Team	Pld	T	G	FG	P
1941–42	Newtown Jets	19	0	0	0	0
1944	Eastern Suburbs	3	0	0	0	0
	Total	22	0	0	0	0
Representative
Years	Team	Pld	T	G	FG	P
1941	New South Wales	1	1	0	0	3

Roy George Street (6 October 1915 – 26 September 1959) was an Australian rugby league footballer.

== Biography ==
A hooker, Street came originally from Kurri Kurri in the Hunter Region and joined Newtown via Wollongong in 1941. He had two seasons playing first–grade for Newtown and earned New South Wales selection his first year, travelling to Brisbane as a reserve for the interstate series against Queensland. After missing all of 1943 with injury, Street moved on to Eastern Suburbs in 1944 for one further season in first–grade.

Street later settled in Balgownie and died aged 43 of a "long illness" in 1959.
