= Roley Young =

Australian rugby league footballer

Personal information
- Born: Sydney, New South Wales, Australia

Playing information
- Position: Fullback
Club
Years	Team	Pld	T	G	FG	P
1959–60	Newtown	7	0	8	0	16

Roley Young is an Australian former rugby league footballer who played for the Newtown Jets in the New South Wales Rugby League premiership competition. He played at fullback.

== Background ==
Young was born in Sydney, New South Wales, Australia.

== Playing career ==
He made his first grade debut during the 1959 NSWRFL season. On 30 May 1959, in a match against the North Sydney Bears, Young kicked five goals. However, later in the season he was dropped in favour of Ron Wright. Newtown finished fourth that season.

During the 1960 NSWRFL season, Young played mostly in reserve grade, and he was passed over by selectors in favour of Wright and John Kenny. He did, however, make appearances as a substitute.
