= Tim Barnes (rugby league) =

Australian rugby league footballer

Personal information
- Full name: Timothy Barnes
- Born: 8 February 1961 (age 64); Sydney, New South Wales, Australia

Playing information
- Position: Fullback, Wing, Centre
Club
Years	Team	Pld	T	G	FG	P
1983	Newtown Jets	20	4	0	0	16
1984	Eastern Suburbs	4	0	0	0	0
1986	Parramatta Eels	4	1	0	0	4
	Total	28	5	0	0	20
- Source: As of 3 June 2019

Tim Barnes is an Australian former rugby league footballer who played in the 1980s. He played for the Newtown Jets, Eastern Suburbs and the Parramatta Eels in the New South Wales Rugby League (NSWRL) competition.

== Playing career ==
Barnes made his first grade debut for Newtown against South Sydney in Round 3 1983 at Henson Park playing from the bench in a 36-10 victory.

Barnes played 20 games for Newtown in 1983 which would prove to be the club's last in the top grade of Australian rugby league. Barnes played in Newtown's final ever match in the NSWRL premiership, scoring a try in a 9-6 victory over the Canberra Raiders at Campbelltown Stadium.

Following Newtown's ejection from the premiership for financial reasons, Barnes signed with Eastern Suburbs. Barnes made only four appearances for the club as they finished second last on the table. In 1986, Barnes joined Parramatta and mainly played from the wing or the bench. Barnes did not play in the club's 1986 premiership victory over rivals Canterbury-Bankstown.
