= Jack Shumack =

Australian rugby league footballer and coach

Personal information
- Full name: John Francis Shumack
- Born: 15 April 1904; St Peters, New South Wales, Australia
- Died: 2 January 1974 (aged 69); Canberra, A.C.T., Australia

Playing information
- Position: positions
Club
Years	Team	Pld	T	G	FG	P
1928	St. George	3	0	0	0	0
1929	Newtown	3	2	0	0	6
	Total	6	2	0	0	6
- Source: Whiticker/Hudson

Jack Shumack (1904–1974) was an Australian rugby league footballer who played in the 1920s

Jack Shumack came from Queanbeyan, New South Wales to join St. George for 1928. The following year was his last in Sydney when he turned out for the Newtown Blue Bags before heading back to bush footy. He became captain coach of Cootamundra in 1930, Queanbeyan in 1931, Mittagong in 1932 and back to Queanbeyan in 1933 to see out his rugby league career. Shumack represented NSW City Seconds in 1929 and NSW Country Seconds in 1930.

Jack Shumack died on 2 January 1974 in Canberra.
