= Arthur Griffiths (rugby league) =

Australian rugby league footballer

Arthur Norman Griffiths
Personal information
- Full name: Arthur Norman Griffiths
- Born: 30 October 1912; Hurlstone Park, New South Wales, Australia
- Died: 2 August 1945 (aged 32)

Playing information
- Position: Centre
Club
Years	Team	Pld	T	G	FG	P
1932–33	Newtown	21	6	0	0	18

Arthur Norman Griffiths was an Australian rugby league footballer who played in the 1930s who played for Newtown in the NSWRL competition as a centre.

== Playing career ==
Griffiths made his first grade debut in 1932 against University.

The following year, Griffiths was a member of the Newtown side which claimed its second premiership defeating St George 18–5 at the Sydney Sports Ground with Griffiths scoring 2 tries. ut to play This would be the last game that Griffiths played for the club as he departed at the end of the year and moved out to captain/coach Queanbeyan .
