= Brian McGreal =

Australian rugby league player

Personal information
- Full name: Brian Thomas McGreal
- Born: 19 July 1935; Balmain, New South Wales, Australia
- Died: 14 July 2007 (aged 71); Cronulla, New South Wales, Australia

Playing information
- Position: Prop
Club
Years	Team	Pld	T	G	FG	P
1960–62	Newtown	35	0	0	0	0
- Source: Whittiker/Hudson As of 27 Apr 2021

Brian McGreal (1935−2007) (known as Sharkey) was an Australian rugby league player from the 1960s.

Born in Balmain, New South Wales and raised near Henson Park, 'Sharkey' McGreal was a Newtown Jets junior who went on to play 3 seasons of first grade with Newtown (1960–62). A tough uncompromising prop forward, McGreal was a crowd favourite at Henson Park and had a long association with the Newtown Blue Bags.

Brian McGreal died on 14 July 2007, at age 71.
