= Jack Thornton (rugby league) =

Australian rugby league footballer (1905–1996)

Personal information
- Full name: John Phillip Thornton
- Born: 14 August 1905 Newtown, New South Wales, Australia
- Died: 4 October 1996 (aged 91)

Playing information
- Position: Prop, Lock, Second-row
Club
Years	Team	Pld	T	G	FG	P
1929–34	Newtown	51	12	0	0	36
Representative
Years	Team	Pld	T	G	FG	P
1930	Metropolis	1	0	0	0	0

John Phillip Thornton (14 August 1905 – 4 October 1996) was an Australian rugby league footballer who played in the 1920s and 1930s for Newtown in the NSWRL competition.

== Playing career ==
Thornton made his first grade debut in Round 6 1929 against University at Marrickville Oval. Newtown would go on to reach the 1929 grand final against South Sydney but Thornton was not selected to play in the game.

In 1930, Thornton was selected to play for Metropolis, the earlier version of what is now known as the NSW City team.

In 1933, Thornton played for Newtown in the 1933 NSWRL grand final against St George at the Sydney Sports Ground. Newtown would win the match 18-5 claiming its second premiership.

Thornton retired during the 1934 season due to a shoulder injury.
