= 1933 Auckland Rugby League season =

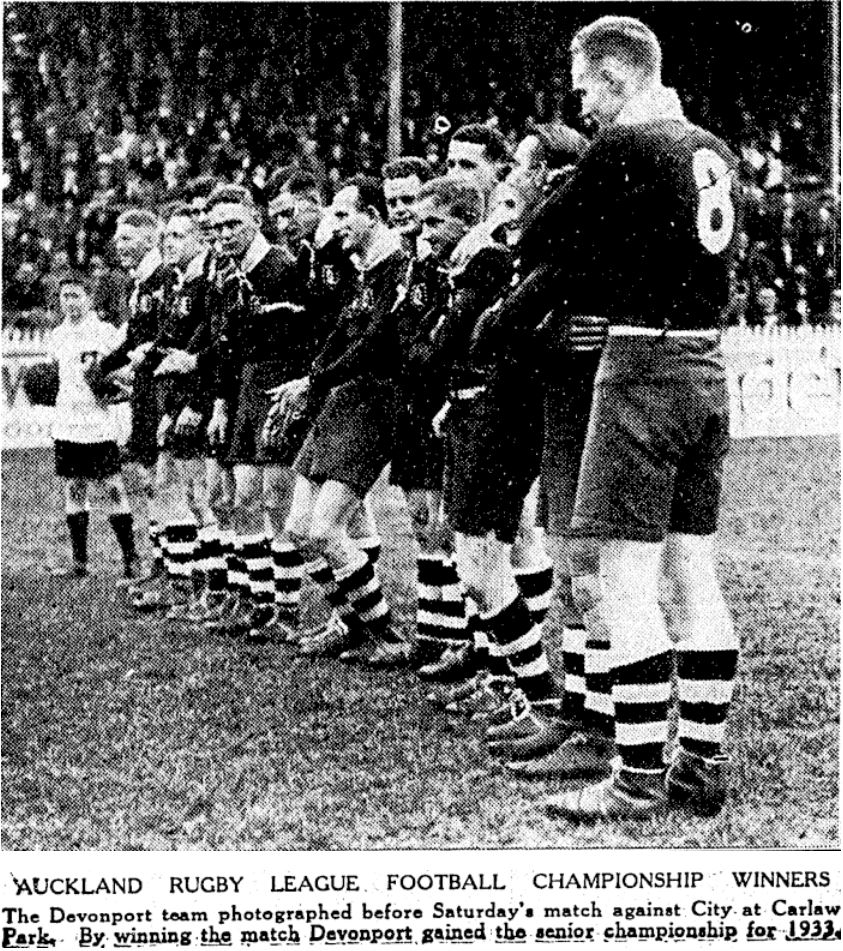
The North Shore Albions (Devonport United) side which won the championship for the 5th time in their history having previously won it in 1913, 1914, 1928, and 1932.

The 1933 season of Auckland Rugby League was its 25th. The championship was won by Devonport United. This was their fifth title having previously won it in 1913, 1914, 1928 and 1932. The first two titles were prior to their merger with the nearby Sunnyside club when they were known as North Shore Albions, a name they later reverted to. They finished 1 point ahead of runner up Marist Old Boys. Devonport also won the Stormont Shield for the third time following victories in 1930 and 1931. They defeated Richmond Rovers in the final by 12 points to 7. Richmond had gained their place in the Stormont Shield match by winning the Roope Rooster with wins over Newton (29–15), Marist Old Boys (10–0), and City Rovers in the final by 26 points to 14. This was Richmond's third Roope Rooster title following wins in 1926 and 1927. Marist were awarded the Thistle Cup for the most competition points scored in the second round.

The Challenge Round trophy (awarded to the team with the best second round competition points) was won by the much improved Newton Rangers after they beat all 5 senior opponents. The Max Jaffe Cup was won by Richmond who defeated Marist comfortably by 31 to 8, and in a charity match to conclude the season Marist reversed this result with a 16 to 5 win over Richmond.

In reserve and lower grade competitions Richmond once again shone. The senior reserve competition was won by Richmond Rovers Reserves who finished with a 6 win, 2 draw, 2 loss record. While Devonport United Reserves won the reserve grade knockout competition when they defeated Richmond 5 to 4 in the final. Richmond once again won the Davis Shield with their lower grade teams combining for more competition points than any other club. This was their 11th win in the 13 years that it has been awarded.

It was a busy season for the Auckland representative side. They played seven matches for six wins and one loss. Their sole loss came against the South Auckland (Waikato) side who beat them 14–0 at Carlaw Park. Auckland had revenge in their final representative match of the season this time beating South Auckland by 17 points to 5. Their other wins came over Taranaki (32–20 and 25–17), North Auckland (28–13), West Coast (28–22), and Hawke's Bay (47–17).

Preceded by 1932	25th Auckland Rugby League season 1933	Succeeded by 1934

== Season News ==
=== Club teams by grade participation ===
Team	Fox Memorial	Reserves	2nd	3rd Open	3rd Int.	4th	5th	6th	7th	Schools	Wednesday Comp	Total
Richmond Rovers	1	1	0	1	1	1	2	1	2	1	0	11
Marist Old Boys	1	1	0	1	1	2	0	0	0	0	0	6
Devonport United	1	1	0	0	1	1	0	1	1	1	0	7
City Rovers	1	1	0	0	1	1	1	0	0	1	0	6
Newton Rangers	1	1	0	0	0	2	0	0	1	0	0	5
Manukau Rovers	0	0	1	0	2	1	0	1	0	0	0	5
Ellerslie United	0	0	1	0	0	0	2	0	1	1	0	5
Ponsonby United	1	1	0	1	0	1	0	0	0	0	0	4
Papakura	0	0	1	1	1	0	1	0	0	0	0	4
Point Chevalier	0	0	1	0	0	1	1	1	0	0	0	4
Northcote & Birkenhead Ramblers	0	0	0	0	1	1	1	0	0	1	0	4
Otahuhu Rovers	0	0	1	0	1	0	0	1	0	0	0	3
Akarana	0	0	0	0	1	1	1	0	0	0	0	3
Mount Albert United	0	0	1	1	0	0	0	0	0	0	0	2
Māngere United	0	0	1	1	0	0	0	0	0	0	0	2
New Lynn	0	0	0	1	0	0	1	0	0	0	0	2
Avondale	0	0	0	0	0	0	0	1	0	1	0	2
Glenora	0	0	0	1	0	0	0	0	0	0	0	1
Wednesday Sides	0	0	0	0	0	0	0	0	0	0	8	8
Total	6	6	7	8	10	12	10	6	5	6	8	84

+ there were company teams representing Amalgamated Theatres (2 teams), Atta Taxis (Cabs), Checker Taxis, City Markets, Railway Locos, Seamen's Union, Victoria United (Markets). There were also House Matches played on Saturdays between business sides including W. Lovett's Limited, Auckland Gas Company, McKendrick Bros, Bycroft's, Miller Paterson & Lees, Australian Waste Products, A.J. Entrican, Star Office, Browne and Geddes, and Auckland Ambulance.

=== Auckland Rugby League meetings ===
George Rhodes announced his resignation of the chairmanship due to business commitments which would require him leaving Auckland regularly. He died suddenly near the end of the season and was buried at Waikumete Cemetery. His successor was Mr. G, Grey Campbell, who was a well known member of the City Council, the Transport Board, and other institutions. Rhodes had been chairman of the league for six and a half years. Mr. R. Doble said Mr. Rhodes deserved to be honoured with life membership for his many years service. This was endorsed by several members. Rhodes started out as a groundsman at Carlaw Park in 1921 before becoming the ground superintendent. At the league AGM it was reported that revenue for the year totalled £2,573, of which £1,791 came from gate receipts, £416 from ground rents, £68 from advertising and £45 from subscriptions. The profit was £754 9/3, with £572 1/3 distributed in grant to clubs. After other spending the total profit for the year was £182 8/. J. Carlaw presided over the meeting where over 100 people were in attendance. Mr. J. B. Donald was elected patron, Mr. J. F. W. Dickson was elected vice-president. At the ARL Board of Control meeting prior to the commencement of the season the chairman Mr. G. Grey Campbell said the policy of granting gate percentages to senior clubs should be retained. He said that it was up to the clubs to produce a high standard of play and the percentage to senior clubs would be an incentive.

Near the conclusion of the season the Auckland Rugby League met and Mr. Campbell said “the gate receipts to date had been in excess of those last season. Clubs had benefited considerably from the percentage granted, and most senior clubs were now in a position to assist their players next season”. The intention was to carefully manage the finances of the league and “to improve the stand accommodation and give players better dressing facilities”.

The New Zealand Herald printed an article ‘reviewing’ the season where they wrote of the visiting St George team and the standard of play in Auckland. They also discussed the possibility of Auckland teams touring Australia.

=== Carlaw Park ===
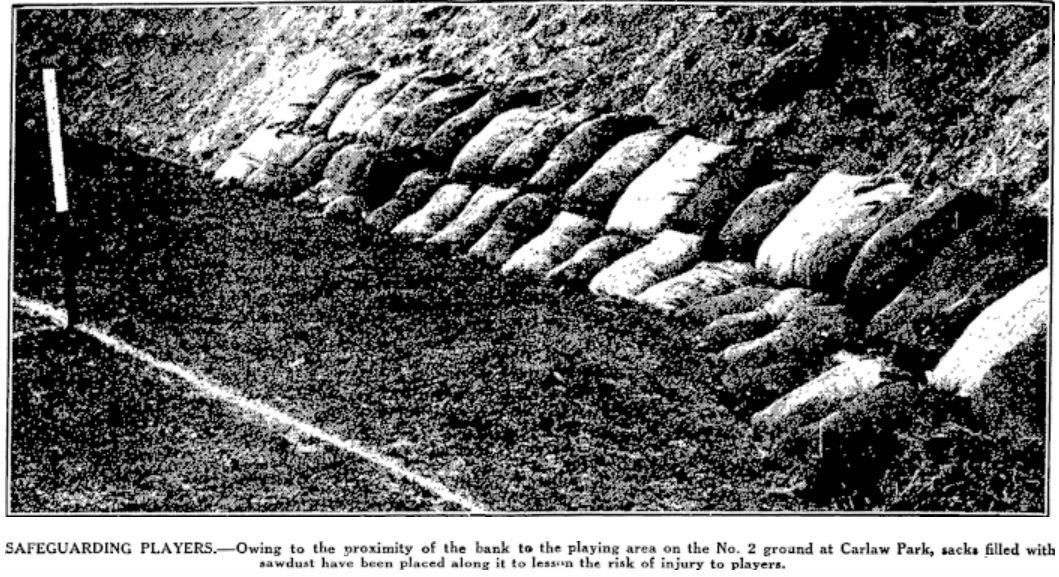

In late April efforts were made to protect players from colliding with the concrete retaining wall on the number 2 field by placing sacks filled with sand bags on the lower part of it. The wall had been built soon before using relief workers during the depression.

=== Junior management meeting ===
At the annual general meeting of the Auckland Rugby League Junior Management Committee on 21 March the annual report (in reference to the 1932 season) was submitted. It stated that there were 1,008 registered players compared with 1,224 the previous season, and 63 teams took the field. The reason for the decline in numbers was put down to the fact that large numbers of people had left Auckland in search of work during the trying economic times. The report then went on to congratulate teams who had won various trophies in the Junior grades in the 1932 season.

=== Senior competition ===
It was decided prior to the season that the reserve grade games would be played before their respective senior teams. This had been requested by clubs as it would help them ensure they had players available for their top side at all times. In spite of this there were no changes ultimately made at all to the scheduling with all senior matches played at Carlaw Park apart from rare exceptions. One reserve grade match was played at Carlaw Park most weekends with the other matches usually played at the nearby Auckland Domain.

The Auckland Rugby League decided at a meeting following the first round of the Roope Rooster competition that a new competition for senior teams spread over 5 weeks would take place. With the senior competition having reverted to 6 teams 2 seasons earlier the round robin was over relatively quickly leaving more time later in the season than had previously existed. The matches were to be unique in that they would be of 40 minutes duration with no interval. Most weeks two of the games would be played prior to an inter-provincial match. In the event of a tie the team that had the best for and against record would be declared the winners and a special trophy would be awarded.

It was also decided that force downs in teams own in goal and kicks that went dead in goal would be worth points in order to speed up the games. These rules were used in an annual competition in Sydney when there were no representative games on. Newton ultimately won this round and it was a key factor in them being given the opportunity to play against the touring St George team.

=== St George tour ===
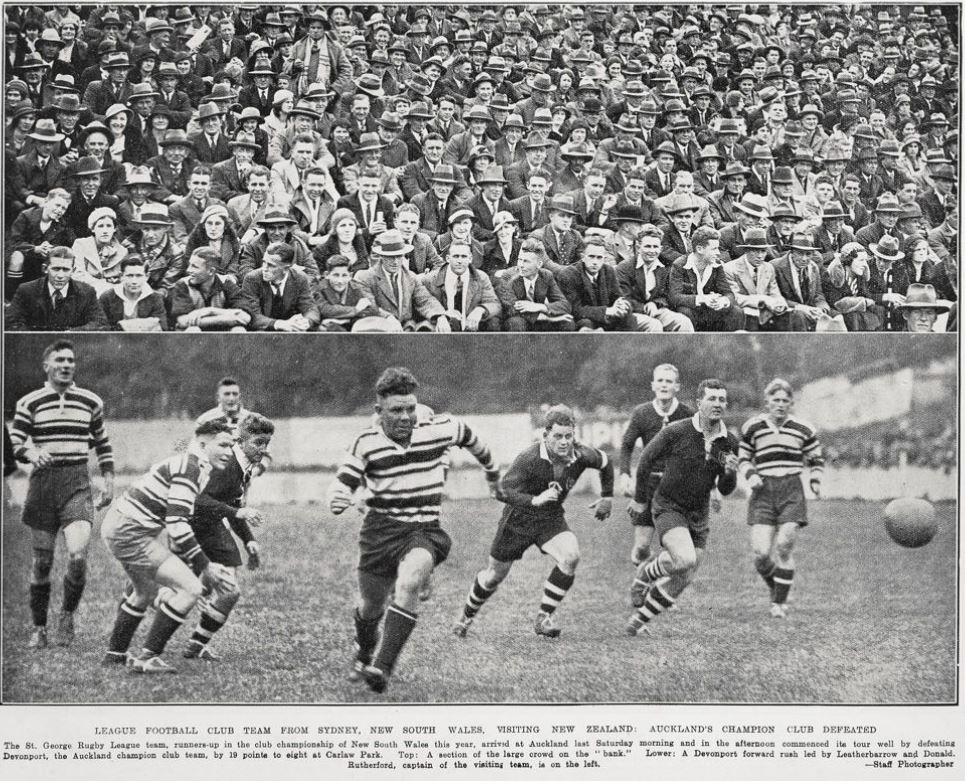
Jim Rutherford of St George chasing the ball with Bert Leatherbarrow and John Donald of Devonport following behind.

In September the St George team from Sydney toured the upper North Island. St George had finished runner up in the 1933 NSWRFL. Their first match was against the Auckland champion Devonport United team who they defeated 19–8. They then played a midweek match with Richmond Rovers who they lost to 8–13 and then Marist Old Boys who they also lost to 11–25.

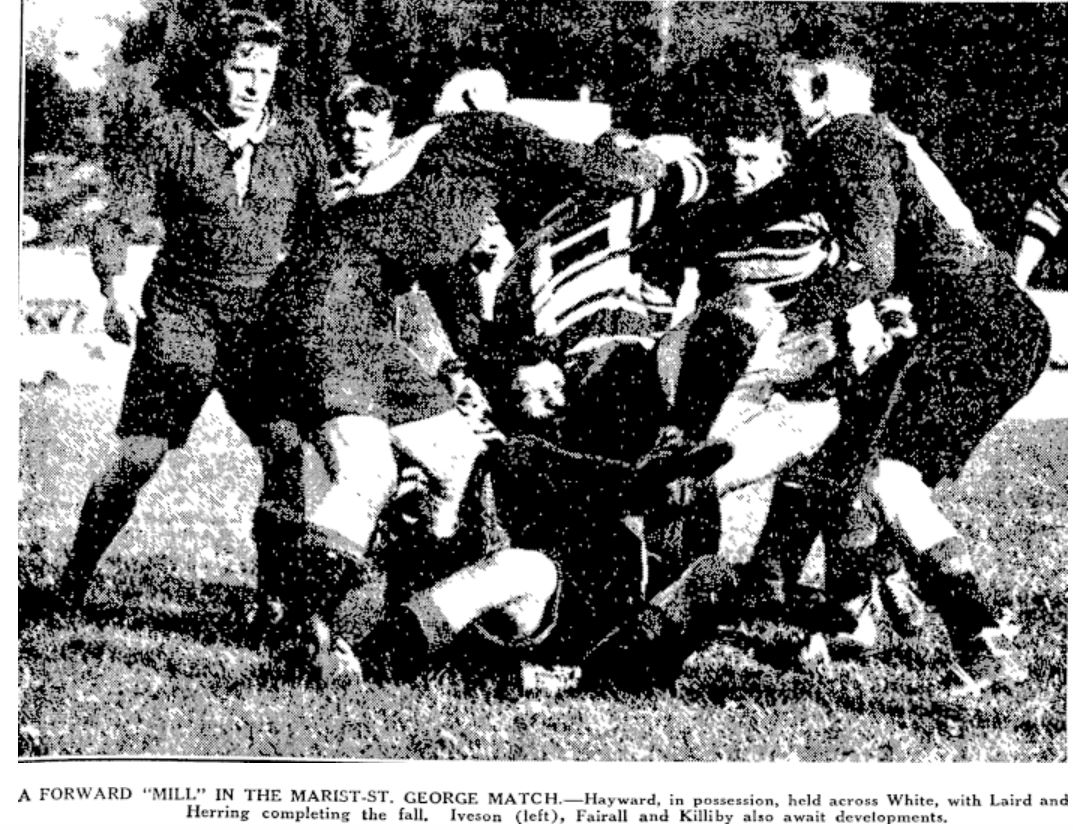
Marist v St George

Following this they departed on a tour of Rotorua to see the geothermal sites before playing South Auckland in Huntly where they won by 17 points to 5. They then travelled to New Plymouth where they had a 22 points to 14 win over Taranaki.

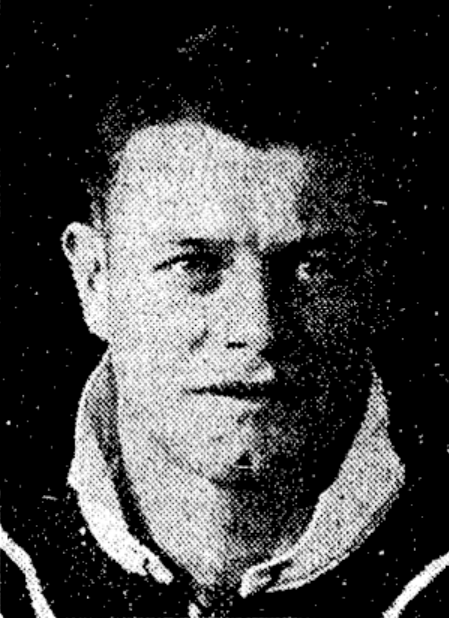
Jack Satherley debuted for Richmond in their October 14 win over St. George.

St George returned to Auckland to complete their tour where they played Newton Rangers in a midweek match which they won 30 points to 23, followed by a return match with Richmond on the Saturday. There had been some debate as to who the last match would be played against. Newton had had a solid season putting in some strong performances and they were arguably the most improved side in Auckland. They had also been the first club to request a match with the touring side however the strongest performing sides had all been matched up with St George first and this last match of the tour was only confirmed at the end of the tour. Following the match with Newton the St George team was entertained by the New Zealand Rugby League at a dinner. Tribute was paid to the “sporting spirit” that the team had shown and a “hand-some engraved shield” was presented to the team by H Wamsley who had made it himself. The shield was to be played for in an annual competition between clubs from Sydney and the Auckland Province. Whilst in Auckland several members of the team along with the manager Mr. J. H. Mostyn visited Sacred Heart College where Mr. Mostyn gave an address to the students on football. Following their last match the team departed for Sydney on the Wanganella Ship at 5pm which meant that the match with Richmond kicked off at the earlier time of 2:45pm. Richmond won the match by 5 points to 3. Prior to the match a running race was held between Len Brennan and Bernard Martin of the touring side and several members of local clubs. It was run from try line to try line and Martin won the race by a foot from Adams (Devonport) in a time of 12.15 seconds with Brennan finishing third. Brennan was killed ten years later in 1943 when the plane he was in was shot down over Italy during World War II.

==== Tour matches ====
Prior to the opening match with Devonport a minutes silence was observed for Ray Morris the Australian rugby league player who got an ear infection and then meningitis while swimming in Colombo on the way to England for the Australian tour. He had disembarked in Malta to get surgery but died from complications at the age of 25. His funeral was taking place in the same day in Sydney.

23 September	Devonport	8–19	St George	Carlaw Park 1
3:00	Try: Leslie Olliff, Bert Leatherbarrow; Con: Albert Laing		Try: Bernard Martin, Percy Fairall, Jim Rutherford, Max Hollingsworth, Tom Haywood; Con: Percy Fairall, Stan Robinson	Attendance: 9,000; Referee: Maurice Wetherill

27 September	Richmond	13–8	St George	Carlaw Park 1
3:00	Try: Cliff Satherley, obstruction try (Maurice Metcalfe), Edwin Abbot; Pen: Tony Milicich, Cliff Satherley		Try: Bernard Martin 2 Pen: Stan Robinson	Referee: Vic Simpson

30 September	Marist	25–11	St George	Carlaw Park 1
3:00	Try: Len Schultz 2, Hec Brisbane, Wilf Hassan, Charles Dunne; Con: Norm Campbell 3 Pen: Norm Campbell 2		Try: Bernard Martin, Tom Killiby, Tom Haywood; Con: Stan Robinson	Attendance: 13,000; Referee: Percy Rogers

5 October	South Auckland	5–17	St George	Huntly, Waikato
	Try: Baker; Con: George Tittleton		Try: Jim Rutherford 2, Tom Haywood, Len Kelly 2 Con: Tom Killiby	Referee: A Williams

7 October	Taranaki	14–22	St George	Pukekura Park, New Plymouth
	Try: J Fraser, Lex Lewis, Doug McLeay, R Coles; Con: J Fraser		Try: Bernard Martin, Len Brennan 2, Charles Rice, Alan Sprouster, Tom Killiby; Con: Tom Killiby, George Ward	Referee: Gordon Hooker

11 October	Newton	23–30	St George	Carlaw Park 1
3:30	Try: Mortimer Stephens 2, Trevor Hall, A Pope, Alex Nathan; Con: Arnold Porteous 2 Pen: Arnold Porteous, Cyril Blacklaws		Try: Percy Fairall, Tom Killiby 2, Len Brennan, Richard Daly, Alan Sprouster; Con: Tom Carey 6	Referee: Les Bull

14 October	Richmond	5–3	St George	Carlaw Park 1
2:45	Try: Tony Milicich; Con: Cliff Satherley		Try: Tom Carey	Referee: Maurice Wetherill

=== Carlaw Park ===
At a meeting of the Auckland Rugby League in the week prior to the start of the season there were several suggestions put forward in regard to Carlaw Park. These were, that the No. 2 ground be available for practice regardless “of the weather, that the stone wall at the end of No. 2 ground beside the terraces should be covered to protect players; that the scoreboard should be raised; that people should be stopped from jumping the terrace fence at the conclusion of the main match; that the transport Board be asked to extend the penny section from the railway station to the Stanley Street stop...”. It was also decided to issue tickets for the admission of unemployed to Carlaw Park, with the official co-operation of the Auckland Provincial Unemployed Association. After it was found that this system was being abused with the tickets being on sold it was decided to charge the unemployed but at a reduced rate of sixpence. Those trying to enter under this system had to produce their unemployment levy book containing an official stamp and a special turn-style was to be used to admit them. All school children up to 14 years of age would be admitted for free.

In early August it was reported that the overhead bridge from Stanley Street to Carlaw Park would be completed by Saturday, 5 August.

As was often the case at Carlaw Park numerous events were held there in the rugby league off season. A whippet race meeting was held in early December along with cycling races, while on 15 December there was a sports carnival involving cycling, running, and wood chopping events. The wood chopping featured W. M. Johnstone, the champion tree-feller of Australia, and New Zealand's D. Hoey, who was "recognised as one of the World's best". The results of the various competitions were published in the Auckland Star.

=== Rule issues ===
At a meeting of the Auckland Rugby League Referees Association on 29 May they decided to recommend to the Board of Control that referees put the ball into the scrum at all grade matches, which was something that had been tried out unsuccessfully 6 years earlier. It was felt that “scrummaging was not satisfactory, particularly with regard to hooking and other infringements around the scrum”. Matches on 2 June featured this new rule change and it was commentated from referees that it had so far improved play around scrums and eliminated a lot of whistle. It was however decided at a meeting of the New Zealand Council several weeks later that the practice was to be discontinued after acting on the recommendation of the New Zealand Referees’ Association. It was also noted that a player when falling on the ball in the goal area needed to ground the ball with their hands and it was play on until this was done so. The play the ball rule was said to be being better controlled with the “same command as evident in a boxing match, when a referee called ‘break’ and the contenders were bound to obey”.

The League Council advised that the forward pass rule was being ruled incorrectly with players being penalised for being offside when receiving a forward pass. As the players had inadvertently got in front of the teammate passing the ball it was clarified that it should be considered a forward pass only and therefore a scrum rather than a penalty. The board approved of this interpretation and referred it to the Referees’ Association.

=== Radio coverage of matches ===
The Auckland Rugby League decided to forward a motion of protest from Ted Phelan to the New Zealand Government regarding the ban on the 1ZR station. The speaker said that patients at the Evelyn Firth Home and Auckland Hospital “were strong in their protest against being denied the privilege of listening to the station”.

=== Midweek competition revived ===
After not being played in 1932 the midweek business league competitions returned with eight teams competing with matches held at Carlaw Park. They were Amalgamated Theatres A, Amalgamated Theatres B, Atta Taxis, Checker Taxis, City Markets, Railway, Seamen United, Victoria United. The competition consisted of two rounds, though the second round would be a knockout competition. Ponsonby and Richmond wrote to Auckland Rugby League objecting to any of their players playing for the midweek teams as it would risk their health for the weekend matches. City and Marist supported the objection. The league decided that no senior or reserve grade players could take part in the competition unless they had the permission of the clubs and the Wednesday management group be advised of this decision. This rule was somewhat ignored however and “two prominent players were injured... in mid-week matches and were not available for Saturday's games”. The league decided to enforce the rule that permission must by granted from senior clubs before players were allowed to participate in the mid-week competition.

=== Auckland Rugby League prize giving ===
In a break from previous years where trophies and awards were handed out at the beginning of the following season it was decided to hold the ceremony at the conclusion of the current season. The event was held at the Manchester Unity Hall on 31 October with free admission and an open invitation. Trophies were presented to teams as follows:

- Senior grade – Fox Memorial Shield (Devonport United), Stormont Shield (Devonport United), Roope Rooster and Max Jaffe Cup (Richmond Rovers), Special Challenge Round (Newton Rangers)
- Senior reserve championship – (Richmond Rovers), Knockout (Devonport United)
- Second Grade – Wright Cup (Mangere), Knockout Foster Shield (Mangere)
- Third Grade Open – Hayward Shield (Marist Old Boys
- Third Grade Intermediate – Walker Cup (Northcote Ramblers), and Knockout Murray Cup (Northcote Ramblers) The undefeated Northcote team were photographed and published in the Auckland Star
- Fourth Grade – Hospital Cup (Marist Old Boys)
- Fifth Grade – Endean Shield (Richmond Rovers)
- Sixth Grade – Rhodes Shield (Devonport United), Knockout Hammill Cup (Otahuhu Rovers)
- Seventh Grade – Myers Cup (Richmond Rovers)
- Primary Schools Competition – Championship Walmsley Shield (Avondale), Knockout Davis Cup (Ellerslie)

With Richmond Rovers winning the Davis Point Shield for the highest number of points scored by any club in all junior grades.

=== Obituaries ===
==== George Frederick Iles ====
George Frederick Iles died aged 39 in Tauranga on 27 March 1933. He was born in Christchurch before moving to Auckland at the age of 18. He played for the Grafton Athletic side in 1915–16 and then for Newton Rangers in 1916–19. He also represented Auckland and New Zealand in the post war period before moving to Tauranga in 1920 to establish a wool and hide export business. He made an attempt to establish rugby league in the Tauranga area but it was short lived and he largely played rugby union where he represented Bay of Plenty against the Springboks in 1921. Iles was also a prominent sprinter, winning races in the North and South Islands. He was survived by his widow and two young sons.

==== George Rhodes ====
Mr. George Rhodes, former chairman of Auckland Rugby League died suddenly on 17 September at Auckland Hospital at the age of 68. He was chairman from 1926 to 1932 and had spent many years at Carlaw Park prior to this as an official on the grounds committee. He had been succeeded by Mr. G. Grey Campbell (the chairman in 1933). He was buried at Waikumete Cemetery where the funeral service was held with a “lengthy cortege of motor vehicles” following the casket. A large number of Auckland Rugby League officials were present, along with representatives from each of the senior clubs. His coffin was draped with the Auckland Rugby League flag.

== Senior grade competitions ==
=== Fox Memorial standings ===
Team	Pld	W	D	L	F	A	Pts
Devonport United	10	7	1	2	142	129	15
Marist Old Boys	10	7	0	3	164	97	14
City Rovers	10	6	0	4	197	147	12
Newton Rangers	10	4	0	6	138	180	8
Richmond Rovers	10	3	1	6	147	131	7
Ponsonby United	10	2	0	8	143	247	4

=== Fox Memorial fixtures ===
==== Round 1 ====
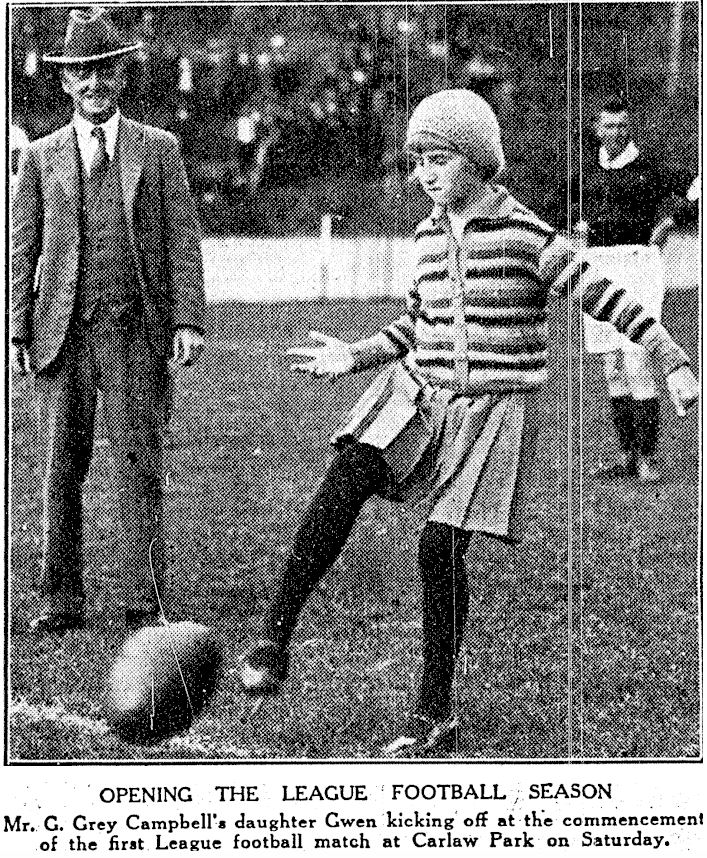

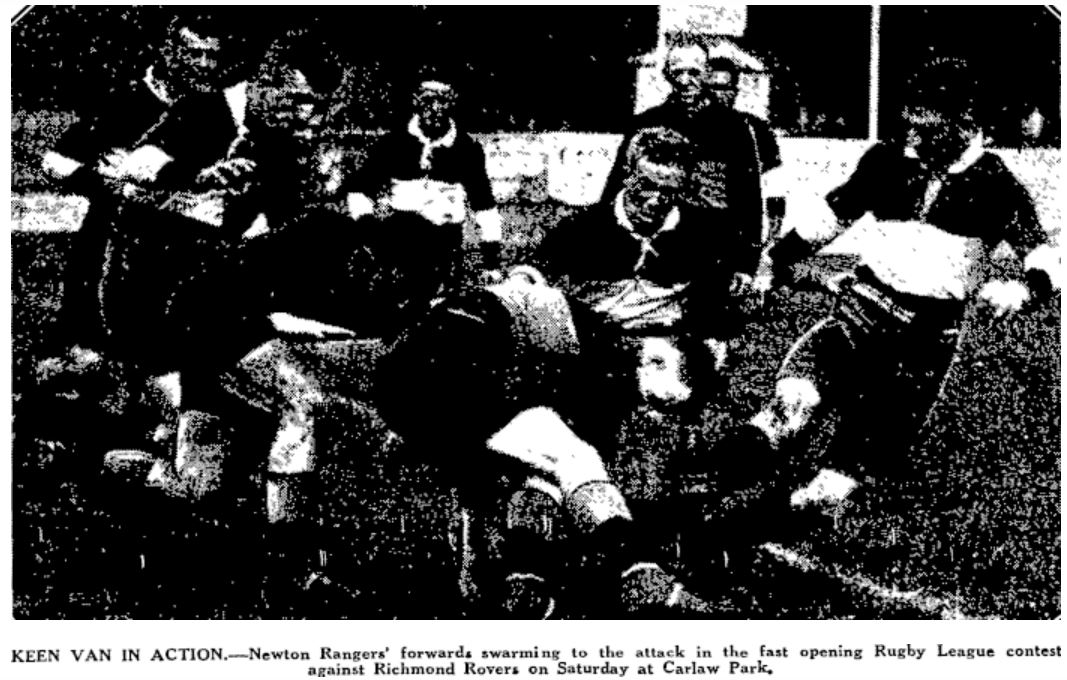
Ray Lawless observing play (centre) in the dark for Richmond. He scored 2 of Richmond's tries and had debuted for New Zealand in the previous season.

Future New Zealand representative Alf Mitchell, who was the first ever Samoan to play for New Zealand (in 1935), was knocked unconscious in his first ever game for Richmond. He was taken to Auckland Hospital and didn't reappear in their first grade side until round 5. He had moved to New Zealand from the Pacific Islands in 1928 aged about 18, and was educated at Feilding High School before moving to Auckland in the early 1930s. Ex-New Zealand representative Maurice Wetherill made his debut as a first grade referee in Newton's match with Richmond. Bill (Rauaroa Tangaroapeau) Turei scored his first try for City. He was killed in 1944 fighting in World War 2. A.B. Nathan, a North Auckland rugby representative was also on debut for Newton.

29 April	Newton	25–18 (8-5)	Richmond	Carlaw Park 1
1:45	Try: Trevor Hall, Charles Allen, Ted Brimble, Arnold Porteous 2, Laurie Barchard, Maurice Quirke; Con: Claude Dempsey, Arnold Porteous		Try: Ray Lawless 2, Ralph Bennett 2 Con: Reece Marshall; Pen: Reece Marshall	Referee: Maurice Wetherill

29 April	City	18–14 (13-7)	Marist	Carlaw Park 1
3:00	Try: Reginald Purdy, James Herring, Bill Turei, William McLaughlin; Con: Puti Tipene Watene; Pen: Puti Tipene Watene 2		Try: Bert Schultz, Charles Dunne; Con: Des Herring 2 Pen: Des Herring 2	Referee: Frank Thomson

29 April	Devonport	26–13 (13-5)	Ponsonby	Carlaw Park 2
3:00	Try: Dick Smith, Alf Smith 3, Albert Laing, Leslie Olliff; Con: Dick Smith 2 Pen: Dick Smith, Leslie Olliff		Try: Charles Thompson 2, George Mills (obstruction try); Con: Frank Delgrosso	Referee: Percy Rogers

==== Round 2 ====
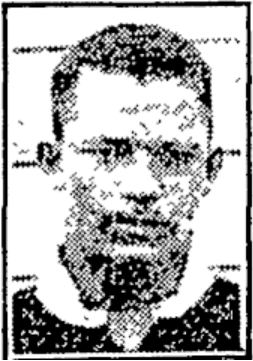
Ted Brimble in the Auckland Star.

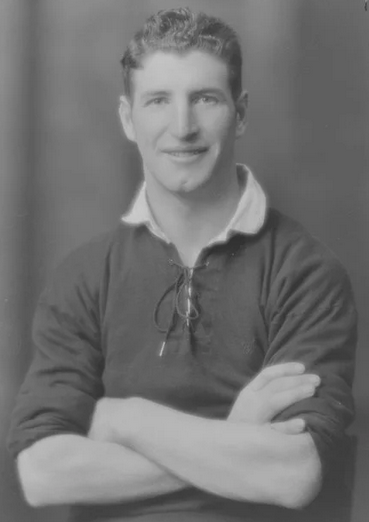
Cliff Satherley debuted for Richmond.

Ted Brimble played a magnificent game for Newton in their 16-12 win over City. The two clubs were to amalgamate a little over a decade later. Cliff Satherley debuted for Richmond in their 14-13 loss to Ponsonby and was said to have paired well with Ray Lawless in the second row. Satherley was said to have given "a fine display, particularly in the loose rushes". He had previously played rugby union for Manukau, Ponsonby, Technical Old Boys, and Marist (Hawkes Bay), as well as representative rugby for Auckland 18 times, and Hawkes Bay 6 times who he captained. He went on to play for New Zealand in all three tests in 1935 against Australia.

6 May	Devonport	10–5 (5-2)	Marist	Carlaw Park 1
3:00	Try: Dick Smith, Bert Leatherbarrow; Con: Albert Laing; Pen: Dick Smith		Try: James Everson; Pen: Alan Clarke	Referee: Percy Rogers

6 May	Newton	16–12 (7-5)	City	Carlaw Park 1
1:30	Try: Arnold Porteous, Charles Allen, Alex Nathan, A Pope; Con: Arnold Porteous; Pen: Arnold Porteous		Try: Reginald Purdy, Bill Turei; Con: Puti Tipene Watene 2 Pen: Puti Tipene Watene	Referee: Vic Simpson

6 May	Ponsonby	14–13 (2-8)	Richmond	Carlaw Park 2
1:30	Try: Draper, Heck Lunn; Con: Frank Delgrosso; Pen: Frank Delgrosso 3		Try: Pat Young, Ray Lawless, Reece Marshall; Con: Tony Milicich, Reece Marshall	Referee: Bert Emirali

==== Round 3 ====
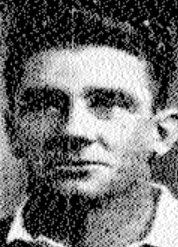
Frank Delgrosso

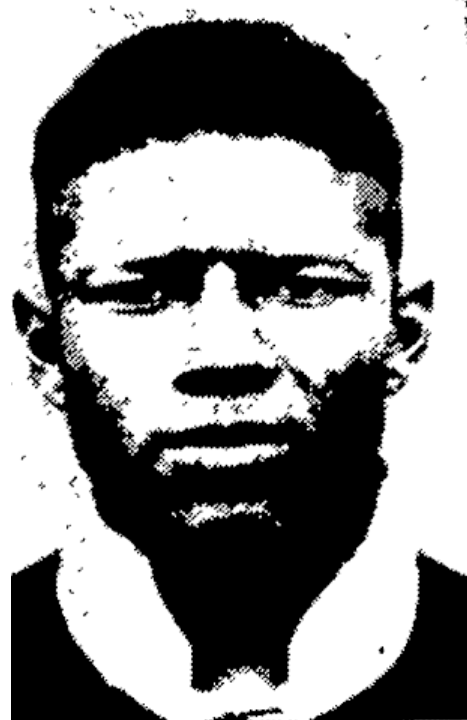
Ted Brimble

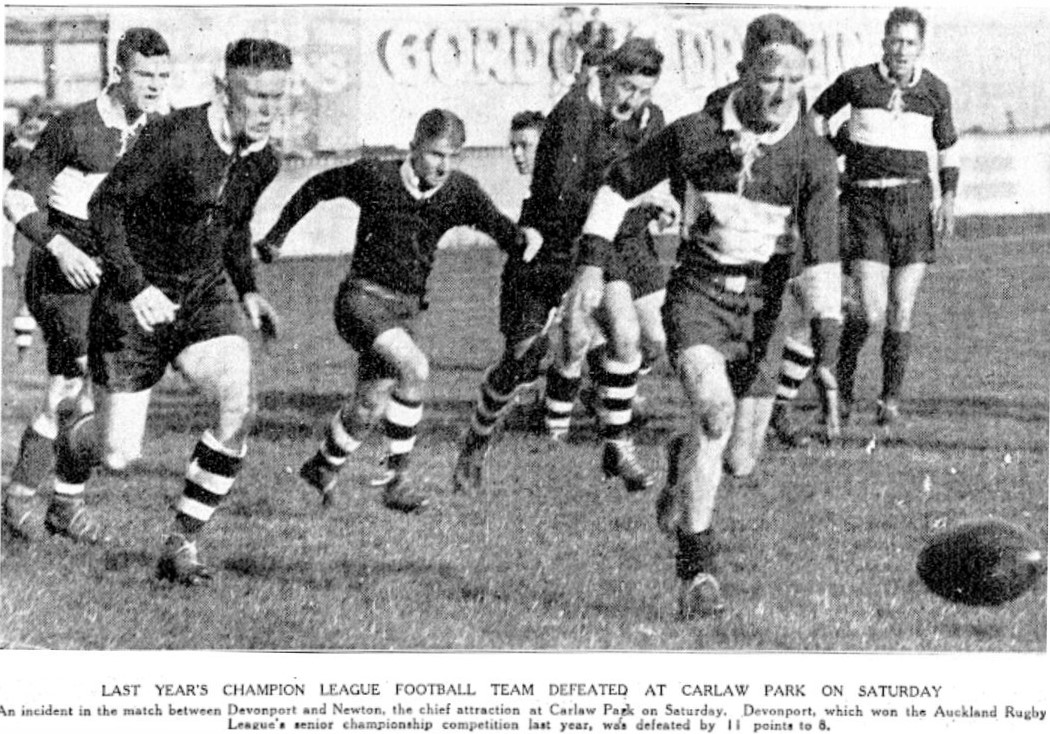

Frank Delgrosso was injured in a tackle in the second half when Ponsonby led 5–3. He was forced from the field and announced his retirement as a result. He had played 15 seasons for Ponsonby and 184 matches, a record at the time. His 771 senior club points was also a record. Delgrosso also played 23 games for Auckland (1919-29) and 42 for New Zealand (1921-28). Newton caused a big upset over Devonport who had won the championship the previous season and would still go on to win the championship again this year. Among the Newton try scorers was five eithth Ted Brimble who had played for New Zealand the year prior. For Devonport, Bert Leatherbarrow and Dick Smith scored their tries. Leatherbarrow played for New Zealand though not for another six years when he was selected at hooker for the tour of England in 1939.

13 May	Newton	11–8 (5-5)	Devonport	Carlaw Park 1
3:00	Try: Arnold Porteous, A Pope, Ted Brimble; Pen: Arnold Porteous		Try: Bert Leatherbarrow, Dick Smith; Con: Albert Laing	Referee: Maurice Wetherill

13 May	Marist	8–5 (2-0)	Ponsonby	Carlaw Park 1
1:30	Try: Len Schultz, James Everson; Pen: Des Herring		Try: Draper; Pen: Frank Delgrosso	Referee: Vic Simpson

13 May	Richmond	21–10 (13-7)	City	Carlaw Park 2
3:00	Try: Trevor Hanlon 2, Reece Marshall, Ralph Bennett, Stan Prentice; Con: Reece Marshall; Pen: Reece Marshall 2		Try: Stan Clark, Horatio Drew; Con: Puti Tipene Watene; Pen: Puti Tipene Watene	Referee: Percy Rogers

==== Round 4 ====
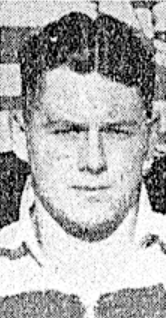
Arthur Kay

With Frank Delgrosso's retirement after injury the previous weekend Francis Herring took over the kicking duties for Ponsonby. He kicked 5 goals and scored a try, while his brother James also scored a try for Ponsonby. James son, Barry (Tank) Herring later coached Auckland B rugby union side, while their cousin Des Herring who was at the Marist club became Kiwi 261 in 1938. Junior player, Arthur Kay debuted for Ponsonby in Delgrosso's place at fullback. Kay would go on to play over 180 games for Ponsonby in 13 seasons in their first grade side and represent New Zealand 11 times from 1935 to 1939. During the game Reginald Keesing and Draper of Ponsonby were injured during the second half and left the field, with City equalising and then going on to win. City were missing Puti Tipene Watene (fullback), Reginald Purdy (five eighth), and Vincent Axmann (halfback) all through recent injuries.

20 May	Marist	11–6 (0-0)	Newton	Carlaw Park 1
3:00	Try: Hec Brisbane, Huck Flanagan, Bert Schultz; Con: Des Herring		Try: Laurie Barchard, Ted Brimble	Referee: Vic Simpson

20 May	Devonport	18–17 (10-17)	Richmond	Carlaw Park 1
1:45	Try: Alf Smith, Bert Leatherbarrow, Dick Smith, C Rhodes; Con: Dick Smith 2 Pen: Dick Smith		Try: Ralph Bennett 2, Reece Marshall; Con: Reece Marshall 2 Pen: Reece Marshall 2	Referee: Bert Emirali

20 May	City	22–15 (6-7)	Ponsonby	Carlaw Park 2
3:00	Try: Francis Herring, James Herring, Horatio Drew, Stan Clark; Con: Francis Herring 2 Pen: Francis Herring 3		Try: George Mills, Roy Bright, H Neale; Con: George Mills 2 Pen: George Mills	Referee: Maurice Wetherill

==== Round 5 ====
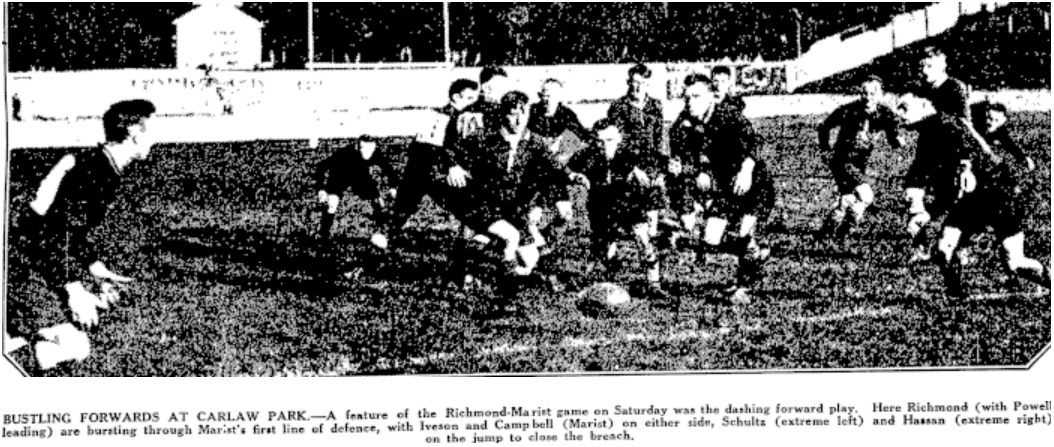
Roy Powell in the centre closest to the ball with James Everson to the immediate left and Gordon Campbell to the right. On the extreme left is Bert Schultz while to the right in line with the ball is Wilf Hassan

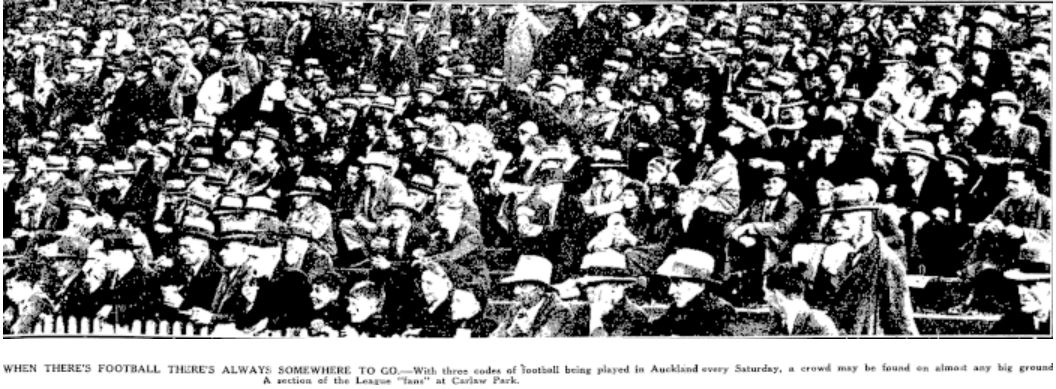
A section of the terrace crowd at Carlaw Park for the Round 5 matches.

Just two matches were played at Carlaw Park with both games played simultaneously at 3pm on the two fields. Marist beat Richmond in the main match on Carlaw Park #1 with Des Herring scoring one of their two tries. The difference was the goal kicking of Norm Campbell who converted both tries and kicked a penalty, while Roy Powell and Ralph Jenkinson's tries went unconverted. Powell would go on to represent New Zealand at halfback in 1935 and 1936 but was being used by Richmond as a loose forward despite weighing just 59 kilograms. A.B. Nathan was ordered off for Newton for striking a Ponsonby player on the #2 field. He had recently begun playing for Newton after previously having been a representative rugby union player in the North Auckland province. The two forward packs had shown "friction" towards each other and the referee, Percy Rogers, had ordered the two hookers (L Stevens of Ponsonby and Ed St George of Newton) to change places with Victor Fagan and Maurice Quirke respectively. The change made little difference and Nathan was sent off soon after. Devonport hosted City at the Devonport Domain and won easily 24-13, outscoring City by six tries to three. P Masefield and Alf Smith scored doubles for the winners while Horatio Drew achieved the same feat for the losers.

27 May	Marist	12–6 (7-0)	Richmond	Carlaw Park 1
3:00	Try: Des Herring, Bert Schultz; Con: Norm Campbell 2 Pen: Norm Campbell		Try: Roy Powell, Ralph Jenkinson	Referee: Stuart Billman

27 May	Ponsonby	28–17 (15-7)	Newton	Carlaw Park 2
3:00	Try: Oakley Browne, George Mills, L Stevens, Heck Lunn, Draper, Leonard Riley; Con: George Mills 5		Try: Hill, Henry Crook 2 Con: Hill 2 Pen: Hill 2	Referee: Percy Rogers

27 May	Devonport	24–13 (8-3)	City	Devonport Domain
3:00	Try: P Masefield 2, Hugh Simpson, Alf Smith 2, George Radonich; Con: Dick Smith, Albert Laing, Arthur Sowter		Try: Horatio Drew 2, Bill Turei; Con: Puti Tipene Watene	Referee: Vic Simpson

==== Round 6 ====
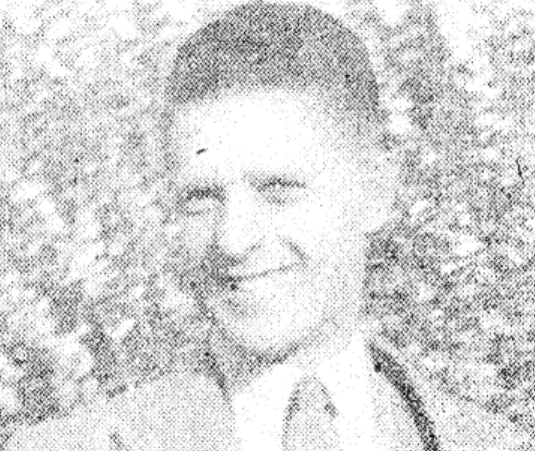
Bill Telford, Richmond forward who later managed and coached New Zealand for many years in the 1940s-70s.

Twenty seven year old Horatio Drew for City Rovers was knocked unconscious when he was tackled and was taken to Auckland Hospital in a St John Ambulance. His condition was reported as being satisfactory by the New Zealand Herald the following day. Francis (Frank) Herring also left the field injured. Harry Wayne debuted for City and played well. He was a former Waitaki High School student in the Taranaki and would go on to represent Auckland four times in 1933-34. Future New Zealand coach Bill Telford scored two tries for Richmond in their 18-10 win over Newton. Telford had debuted for the Richmond senior side in 1927 before moving to Australia and playing for the Glebe in six matches in 1928. He then returned to Richmond and played for them from 1929 to 1937. He also represented Auckland 8 times. Telford coached New Zealand in 1956-57, 1961-63, and 1965. Newton had started the season with three wins but had now lost three straight. Cliff Satherley who had joined Richmond at the start of the season scored a try and kicked a conversion.

3 June	Richmond	18–10 (8-10)	Newton	Carlaw Park 1
1:30	Try: Bill Telford 2, Ralph Bennett, Cliff Satherley; Con: Reece Marshall, Cliff Satherley; Pen: Ralph Bennett		Try: Arnold Porteous, Henry Crook; Con: Claude Dempsey; Pen: Arnold Porteous	Referee: Maurice Wetherill

3 June	Devonport	14–13 (6-5)	Ponsonby	Carlaw Park 1
3:00	Try: R O'Donnell, Ted Scott, C Rhodes, John Donald		Try: Leonard Riley, Heck Lunn, Roy Bright; Con: Arthur Kay, George Mills	Referee: Percy Rogers

3 June	City	13–8 (8-5)	Marist	Carlaw Park 2
3:00	Try: Rowntree 2, Bill Turei; Con: Steve Watene 2		Try: Jim Laird, Len Schultz; Con: Norm Campbell	Referee: Frank Thompson

==== Round 7 ====
Dick Smith and Albert Laing both left the field injured in the second half leaving Devonport with just 11 players against Marist. While Newton suffered the same fate with Ted Brimble and Cameron colliding. Cameron went off while Brimble hobbled around for the rest of the match after his knee was kicked in the collision. Neither was able to play the following week. Cecil Roy Bright (who went by Roy), the 21 year old Ponsonby back was concussed in their loss to Richmond. All three matches were one sided with the winning teams scoring far more heavily than in recent weeks. Norman Drew and Claude List both scored hat tricks for Marist in their 35-9 win over Devonport. Drew had only just transferred from Richmond to join Marist

17 June	Marist	35–9 (8-4)	Devonport	Carlaw Park 1
3:00	Try: Norman Drew 3, Charles Dunne 2, Claude List 3, Unknown x 1 Con: Norm Campbell 2, Claude List, Des Herring		Try: Bert Leatherbarrow; Con: Dick Smith; Pen: Dick Smith 2	Referee: Les Bull

17 June	City	35–13 (12-5)	Newton	Carlaw Park 2
3:00	Try: Vincent Axmann, William McLaughlin 2, Bill Turei, George Perry, Pierce 2 Con: Steve Watene 6 Pen: Steve Watene		Try: Ted Brimble, Arnold Porteous, C Thompson; Con: Arnold Porteous 2	Referee: Stuart Billman

17 June	Richmond	36–12 (13-12)	Ponsonby	Carlaw Park 1
1:30	Try: Pat Young 2, Reece Marshall 2, Alf Mitchell, Cliff Satherley, Roy Powell, Stan Prentice; Con: Tony Milicich, Reece Marshall 4 Pen: Reece Marshall		Try: Arthur Kay, Moran; Con: Jones; Pen: Jones 2	Referee: Wilfred Simpson

==== Round 8 ====
The win for Marist over Ponsonby was significant for the club in that it was their 100th first grade win in their 15th season in the first grade competition. Marist fullback Norm Campbell was nursing an injured back and didn't play with his place being taken by reserve grader Bill Glover. Glover didn't join the senior side full time until 1935 and played for them until 1943. Dick Smith's leg injury sustained the previous week was said to be so serious that he was unlikely to play again this season. He was replaced by Allan Seagar who came out of retirement and was coaching the side.

24 June	City	12–8 (7-2)	Richmond	Carlaw Park 1
3:00	Try: Bill Turei, Reginald Purdy; Con: Steve Watene 2 Pen: Steve Watene		Try: Tony Milicich, Ray Lawless; Pen: Reece Marshall	Referee: Percy Rogers

24 June	Devonport	11–5 (5-5)	Newton	Carlaw Park 1
1:30	Try: Alf Smith, R O'Donnell, Bert Leatherbarrow; Con: Albert Laing		Try: Maurice Quirke; Con: Arnold Porteous	Referee: H Taylor

24 June	Marist	34–17 (16-10)	Ponsonby	Carlaw Park 2
3:00	Try: Claude List 2, James Everson 2, Charles Dunne, Jim Laird 2, Len Schultz, Bert Schultz, Des Herring; Con: Charles Dunne 2		Try: Rush, H Neale, Leonard Riley; Con: Jones, George Mills 2 Pen: George Mills	Referee: Owen Chalmers

==== Round 9 ====
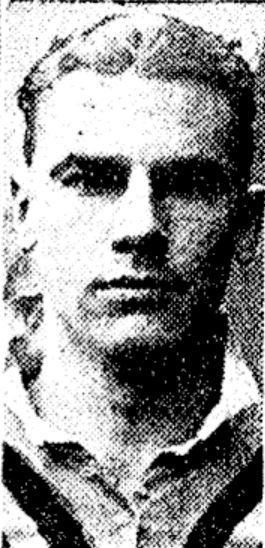
Brian Riley debuted for Ponsonby.

The 50 points that City scored in their Round 9 match against Ponsonby was the fourth time that a senior team had scored 50 points in 1st grade history. On all four occasions the team to do so was City. In 1920 they defeated Grafton Athletic 66–13, in 1921 they beat Fire Brigade 61–7, and in 1925 they defeated Athletic 57–7. They scored 12 tries with 6 of them converted by Puti Tipene Watene. Winger Bill Turei scored a hat trick while fellow back George Perry scored a double, as did forward Stan Clark. For Ponsonby 18 year old Brian Riley debuted alongside his older brother Leonard who had been playing first grade for Ponsonby since 1922. Brian would go on to play 11 seasons for Ponsonby and played in two matches for New Zealand in 1935 and 1937. In the main match on Carlaw Park #1 Devonport trailed 0-5 at halftime after Richmond fullback opened the scoring with a rare drop goal. There were typically only a handful kicked in an entire season while some years saw none whatsoever. Devonport went on to draw the game after a second half penalty to Arthur Sowter was followed by a late try to back George Radonich. Albert Laing had a conversion to take the lead but hit the upright. A frantic finish followed but neither team could break the deadlock. In Marist's 24-8 win over Newton, forward Des Herring scored three tries, while in form five eighth Charles Dunn scored a try and kicked three conversions. He represented Auckland in their July 15 match with South Auckland (Waikato) which was to be his only representative match.

1 July	Devonport	5–5 (0-5)	Richmond	Carlaw Park 1
3:00	Try: George Radonich; Pen: Arthur Sowter		Try: Stan Prentice; Drop: Merv Lee	Referee: Maurice Wetherill

1 July	Marist	24–8 (5-5)	Newton	Carlaw Park 1
1:30	Try: Des Herring 3, Charles Dunn, Wilf Hassan, Bert Schultz; Con: Charles Dunn 3		Try: A Pope, John Harding; Con: Arnold Porteous	Referee: Stuart Billman

1 July	City	50–11 (16-0)	Ponsonby	Carlaw Park 2
3:00	Try: George Perry 2, Bill Turei 3, Pierce 2, Harry Wayne, William McLaughlin, Stan Clark 2, Reginald Purdy; Con: Steve Watene 6, William McLaughlin		Try: Arthur Kay 2, H Neal; Con: Jones	Referee: Vic Simpson

==== Round 10 ====
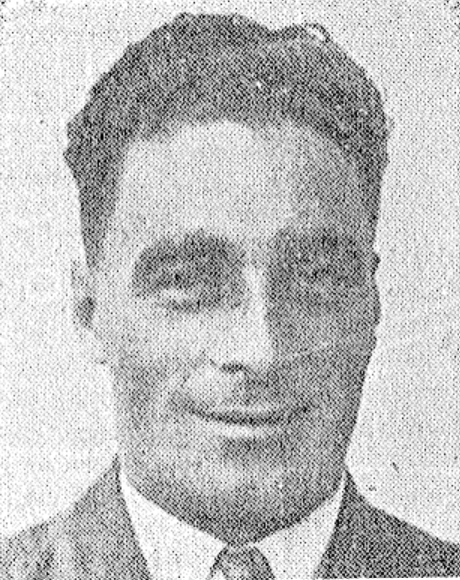
Mortimer Stephens (Newton)

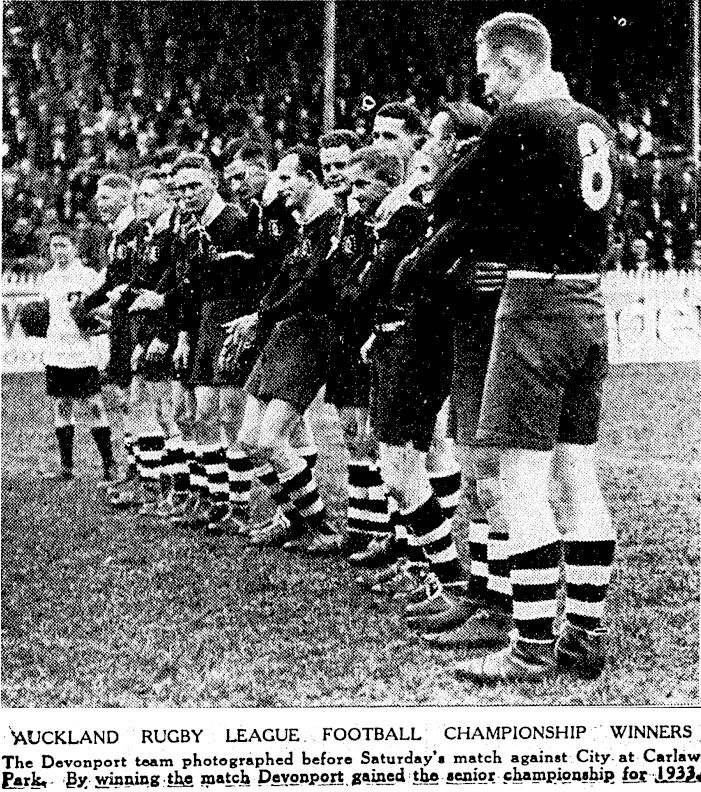

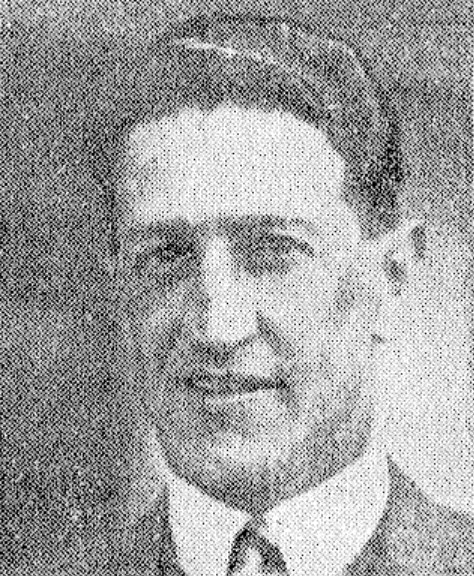
Cyril Blacklaws (Newton)

A photograph of the Devonport team was taken before their match with City. Devonport went on the win 17-12 with Kiwi's Allan Seagar (2) and Bert Leatherbarrow scoring tries, along with Horace Hunt, a former Auckland cricket wicket keeper. The win meant they won the championship by a point from Marist. It was Devonport's second consecutive championship and their fifth in total (1913, 1914, 1928, 1932, and 1933). If City had won they would have tied for first with Marist, forcing a playoff for the title. For City, Steve Watene scored a try, kicked a conversion, and 2 penalties. In Newton's win over Ponsonby, Mortimer Stephens debuted and scored 2 tries. He would later sign for St Helens in England. Also on debut for Newton was Cyril Blacklaws. Both players had transferred from the Papakura club. Lou Hutt made his first appearance of the season for Ponsonby, ironically he had played for St Helens two seasons earlier. Newton had their first win over Ponsonby since May 12 in 1933. Ponsonby had won 14 with 1 draw from that date.

8 July	Devonport	17–12	City	Carlaw Park 1
3:00	Try: Allan Seagar 2, Bert Leatherbarrow, Horace Hunt, Hugh Simpson; Con: John Donald		Try: Steve Watene, Reginald Purdy; Con: Steve Watene; Pen: Steve Watene 2	Attendance: 10,000; Referee: Vic Simpson

8 July	Marist	13–5	Richmond	Carlaw Park 1
1:30	Try: Charles Dunne, Wilf Hassan, Len Schultz; Con: Norm Campbell 2		Try: Pat Young; Pen: Reece Marshall	Attendance: 10,000; Referee: Frank Thompson

8 July	Newton	27–15	Ponsonby	Carlaw Park 2
3:00	Try: A Pope, Mortimer Stephens 2, Arnold Porteous, Ted Brimble, Trevor Hall 2 Con: Aiden Hickey 2, Ted Brimble		Try: Roy Bright 2, Leonard Riley; Con: Jones; Pen: Jones 2	Referee: Les Bull

=== Roope Rooster knockout competition ===
Auckland Rugby League made the decision to expand the Roope Rooster somewhat by allowing the leading teams from the South Auckland competition to enter it. Taupiri and Huntly were both drawn to play in the first round against Richmond and Marist respectively. Both Taupiri and Huntly both withdrew from their matches in the days leading up to their matches forcing an emergency committee to redraw the first round matches. The competition took a further hit when the entire first round was postponed due to poor weather. Not only were all the league fixtures not played but all rugby matches also were postponed as was the horse racing at Ellerslie Racecourse.

The Ponsonby match with Marist was played at Sturges Park in Otahuhu as a way of promoting rugby league in the area with a charge being made at the ground to gain funds.

Bert Cooke turned out for Richmond for the first time in the season against Newton Rangers in Round 1 of the Roope Rooster after returning to Auckland from Waihou where he had been working.

City received a bye after their victory in the first round with Marist and Richmond playing in the semi-final. A percentage of the gate takings from the match would go towards the Auckland Ladies’ Hockey Association which they would put towards the cost of sending a representative ladies team on tour.

==== Round 1 ====
29 July	City	15–8 (3-8)	Devonport	Carlaw Park 1
1:30	Try: Bill Turei, Harry Wayne, James Herring; Con: Steve Watene 3		Try: P Masefield, Alf Smith; Con: Albert Laing	Referee: Wilfred Simpson

29 July	Richmond	29–15 (21-0)	Newton	Carlaw Park 1
3:00	Try: Ray Lawless, Reece Marshall 2, Stan Prentice 2, Edwin Abbott, Bert Cooke; Con: Reece Marshall 4		Try: Charles Allen, Trevor Hall, Sellars; Con: Arnold Porteous 2 Pen: Arnold Porteous	Referee: Frank Thompson

29 July	Marist	26–13 (10-5)	Ponsonby	Sturges Park, Otahuhu
3:00	Try: Huck Flanagan 2, Len Schultz 2, Claude List, Hec Brisbane; Con: Norm Campbell 3 Pen: Norm Campbell		Try: Brian Riley, Thomas Holland, Roy Bright; Con: Jones; Pen: Jones	Referee: Percy Rogers

==== Semi final ====
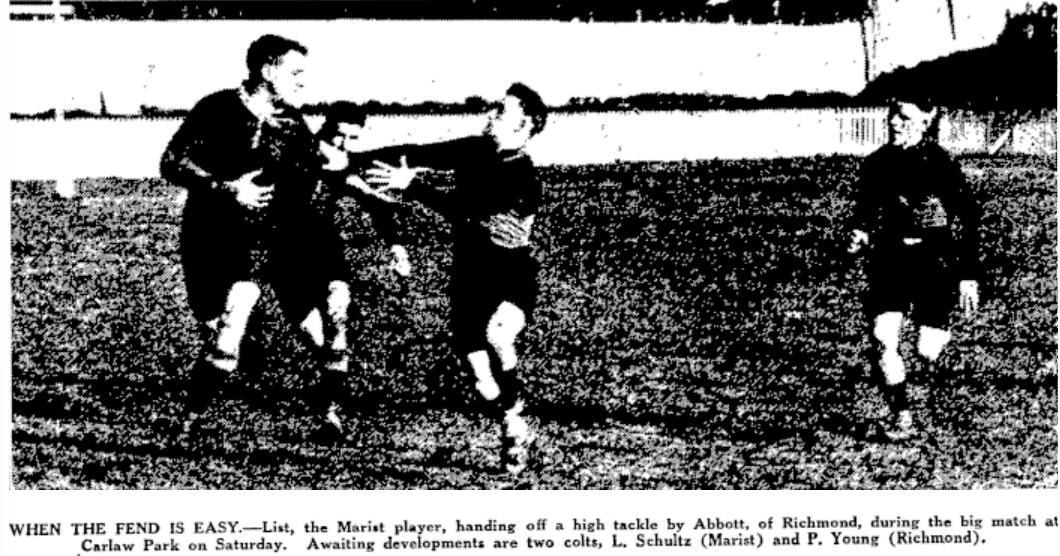

For Richmond their tries were scored by Ray Lawless and Bill Telford, while Robert Marshall converted one and Bert Cooke, who had only made his season debut the previous weekend kicked a penalty.

5 August	Richmond	10–0	Marist	Carlaw Park 1
3:00	Try: Ray Lawless, Bill Telford; Con: Robert Marshall; Pen: Bert Cooke			Referee: Stuart Billman

==== Final ====
The final also doubled as their round 1 match in the Challenge Round. Ernest McNeil who had been in the Richmond senior B side all season debuted for the senior side and scored 3 tries.

19 August	Richmond	26–16	City	Carlaw Park 1
3:00	Try: Ernest McNeil 3, Cliff Satherley 2, Roy Powell; Con: Tony Milicich 2 Pen: Tony Milicich, Bert Cooke		Try: Bill Turei, Stan Clark; Con: Steve Watene 2 Pen: Steve Watene 3	Referee: Les Bull

=== Challenge round ===
The final of the Roope Rooster doubled as a Challenge Round match as well between Richmond Rovers and City Rovers. The other 1st round matches were played on the same day. The match between Newton and Ponsonby which resulted in the unusual score of 1–0 to Newton was protested by Ponsonby. The competition was being played under altered rules with matches lasting just 40 minutes and with balls forced in teams own in goals resulting in 1 point to the opposition team. Ponsonby claimed that the referee “allowed the game to continue after Newton committed a breach in-goal”, and that they should have been awarded a point. It was decided that if the match was going to have a bearing on the result of the competition then the match would be replayed. Newton went on to win the round after they defeated all 5 opponents.

Team	Pld	W	D	L	F	A	Pts
Newton Rangers	5	5	0	0	56	23	10
Marist Old Boys	5	3	1	1	58	41	7
Devonport United	4	2	1	1	31	32	5
Ponsonby United	4	1	0	3	23	31	2
Richmond Rovers	4	1	0	3	26	45	2
City Rovers	4	0	0	4	26	45	0

==== Round 1 ====
Charlie White debuted for Marist. He was a former Northland rugby union representative.

19 August	Devonport	9–3	Ponsonby	Carlaw Park 1
1:45	Try: John Donald, Alf Smith; Con: Leslie Oliff; Pen: 1 force down		Try: Thomas Holland	Referee: Vic Simpson

19 August	Newton	13–11	Marist	Carlaw Park 1
2:30	Try: Mortimer Stephens, Trevor Hall; Con: Cyril Blacklaws 2 Pen: Cyril Blacklaws + 1 'force down'		Try: Huck Flanagan, Charles Dunne, Des Herring; Con: Norm Campbell	Referee: Percy Rogers

==== Round 2 ====
26 August	Ponsonby	3–0	Richmond	Carlaw Park 1
1:45	Try: Lou Hutt			Referee: Stuart Billman

26 August	Newton	14–5	Devonport	Carlaw Park 1
2:30	Try: Brown, Ross Sellars, Alex Nathan, Arnold Porteous; Con: Cyril Blacklaws		Try: Horace Hunt; Con: Albert Laing	Referee: Vic Simpson

26 August	Marist	10–5	City	Carlaw Park 2
1:45	Try: Bert Schultz, Hec Brisbane, Charlie White; Con: (+ "force down" = 1 pt)		Try: Reginald Purdy; Con: Bill Turei	Referee: Frank Thompson

==== Round 3 ====
2 September	Devonport	14–12	City	Carlaw Park 1
1:45	Try: R O'Donnell, Alf Smith, George Radonich; Con: Leslie Olliff, Albert Laing; Pen: 1 force down		Try: Bill Turei, Rawiri; Con: Bill Turei 2 Pen: Bill Turei	Referee: Percy Rogers

2 September	Newton	1–0	Ponsonby	Carlaw Park 1
2:30	Pen: 1 force down			Referee: Frank Thompson

2 September	Marist	13–3	Richmond	Carlaw Park 2
	Try: Unknown 13 points		Try: Unknown 3 points	Referee: Vic Simpson

==== Round 4 ====
There was no City v Ponsonby match as City were in New Plymouth playing against the Taranaki representative side.

9 September	Newton	13–7	Richmond	Carlaw Park 1
1:45	Try: Cameron 2, Ross Sellars; Con: Cyril Blacklaws, Claude Dempsey		Try: Edwin Abbott; Con: Tony Milicich; Pen: Tony Milicich	Referee: Maurice Wetherill

9 September	Marist	3–3	Devonport	Carlaw Park 2
2:30	Try: Bert Schultz		Try: Arthur Sowter	Referee: Les Bull

==== Round 5 ====
16 September	Marist	21–17	Ponsonby	Carlaw Park 1
1:30	Try: Hec Brisbane 3, Des Herring, Bert Schultz; Con: Norm Campbell 2 Pen: 2 force downs		Try: Arthur Kay 2, Heck Lunn, Leonard Riley, D Grieve; Con: R Jones	Referee: Stuart Billman

16 September	Newton	15–0	City	Carlaw Park 2
2:30	Try: Arnold Porteous, Mortimer Stephens, Charles Allen; Con: Arnold Porteous 2, Cyril Blacklaws			Referee: Percy Rogers

=== Stormont Shield ===
The Auckland Rugby League said that the winner of the Stormont Shield would earn the right to play against the touring St George team. Ultimately both teams played them anyway, with the losers Richmond in fact playing them twice.

16 September	Devonport	12–7	Richmond	Carlaw Park 1
3:15	Try: Arthur Sowter, Alf Smith; Con: Dick Smith; Pen: Arthur Sowter, Dick Smith		Try: Roy Powell; Con: Tony Milicich; Pen: Merv Lee	Referee: Maurice Wetherill

=== Senior Challenge match for the Max Jaffe Cup ===
It was decided at a meeting of Auckland Rugby League in early October to play a match between Richmond and Marist who had both in the week prior defeated the visiting St George rugby league team (runners-up in the Sydney competition). The match was to find the ‘best club team in Auckland’.

7 October	Richmond	31–8	Marist	Carlaw Park 1
3:15	Try: Stan Prentice 2, Ernest McNeil 2, Cliff Satherley, Tony Milicich, Roy Powell; Con: Cliff Satherley 3 Pen: Cliff Satherley 2		Try: Des Herring, Hec Brisbane; Con: Norm Campbell	Referee: Les Bull

=== Unemployed charity match ===
Marist and Richmond agreed to play in the last match of the season where money raised would go to help the unemployed. The game would be controlled by the central committee of the Grey Lynn Unemployed Relief. Prior to the match there would be a goal kicking competition, a 100-yard race involving senior players and the Waterside Workers’ Band would be performing. Des Herring (Marist) won the goal kicking competition, and Bert Schultz (Marist) won the sprint race with Ernest McNeil (Richmond) second, and F. Jones (Richmond) third. On 8 November at a meeting of the Auckland Rugby League Board of Control the Grey Lynn Relief Committee expressed gratitude for assistance in the success of the football match at Carlaw Park, as a result of which a considerable sum had been raised for the benefit of needy people in the district.

21 October	Marist	16–5	Richmond	Carlaw Park 1
3:00	Try: Charles Dunne, V Smith, Norm Campbell 2 Con: O'Halloran 2		Try: Ray Lawless; Con: Bert Cooke	Referee: A E Smith

=== Top try scorers and point scorers ===
The point scoring lists are compiled from matches played in the Fox Memorial, Roope Rooster and Challenge Round matches which involved all first grade sides. Kiwi international and future member of parliament Puti Tipene (Steve) Watene led the scoring with 79 points followed by Robert Marshall from Richmond with 67. The leading try scorers were Bert Schultz (Marist), Alf Smith (Devonport) and Bill Turei (City) with 11, followed by Arnold Porteous of Newton who scored 9 tries, and Bert Schultz of Marist with 8.

Top try scorers
Rk	Player	Team	Games	Tries
1=	Alf Smith	Devonport	16	11
1=	Bert Schultz	Marist	17	11
1=	Bill Turei	City	15	11
4	Arnold Porteous	Newton	16	9
5	Des Herring	Marist	18	8
6=	Charles Dunn	Marist	17	7
6=	Robert Marshall	Richmond	13	7
6=	Stan Prentice	Richmond	14	7
9=	Claude List	Marist	18	6
9=	Len Schultz	Marist	16	6
9=	Reginald Purdy	City	13	6
9=	Bert Leatherbarrow	Devonport	13	6
9=	Ralph Bennett	Richmond	9	6
9=	Ray Lawless	Richmond	13	6

Top point scorers
Rk	Player	Team	G	T	C	P	DG	Pts
1	Puti Tipene (Steve) Watene	City	13	1	27	11	0	79
2	Robert Marshall	Richmond	13	7	15	8	0	67
3	Arnold Porteous	Newton	16	9	10	4	0	55
4	Bill Turei	City	15	11	3	1	0	41
5=	Des Herring	Marist	18	8	4	3	0	38
5=	Dick Smith	Devonport	8	4	7	6	0	38
7=	George Mills	Ponsonby	7	3	10	2	0	33
7=	Bert Schultz	Marist	17	11	0	0	0	33
7=	Alf Smith	Devonport	16	11	0	0	0	33
10	Charles Dunn	Marist	17	7	4	0	0	31

== Senior reserve competition ==
=== Senior reserve standings ===
Team	Pld	W	D	L	F	A	Pts
Richmond Rovers Reserves	10	6	2	2	85	46	14
Devonport United Reserves	10	7	0	3	49	35	14
Ponsonby United Reserves	10	4	2	4	81	61	10
Marist Old Boys Reserves	10	5	0	5	77	68	10
Newton Rangers Reserves	10	3	0	7	71	71	6
City Rovers Reserves	10	2	0	8	39	120	4

=== Senior reserve fixtures ===
The senior reserve grade was typically low scoring compared to the senior grade and many other lower grades. The senior grade averaged 30.7 points per game compared to just 13.4 in the reserve grade. Remarkably the Devonport reserve grade team did not concede a single point in their final 4 matches and only conceded 35 in total across their ten contests. On the other side was the City Reserves who could not score a single point in their last 4 matches and only managed to score 39 points for the season.

1933 Senior reserve results
	Date		Score		Score	Venue
Round 1	29 April	Richmond	5	Newton	2	Auckland Domain, 3pm
–	29 April	City	3	Marist	0	Auckland Domain, 1:45pm
–	29 April	Devonport	9	Ponsonby	0	Carlaw Park # 2, 1:45pm
Round 2	6 May	Richmond	0	Ponsonby	0	Carlaw Park # 2, 1:30pm
–	6 May	Marist	16	Devonport	8	Auckland Domain, 1:30pm
–	6 May	City	5	Newton	3	Auckland Domain, 3pm
Round 3	13 May	Richmond	7	City	5	Carlaw Park # 2, 1:30pm
–	13 May	Devonport	6	Newton	5	Auckland Domain, 1:30pm
–	13 May	Marist	8	Ponsonby	4	Auckland Domain, 3pm
Round 4	20 May	Ponsonby	25	City	12	Carlaw Park # 2, 1:30pm
–	20 May	Newton	10	Marist	2	Auckland Domain, 1:30pm
–	20 May	Richmond	6	Devonport	0	Auckland Domain, 3pm
Round 5	27 May	Richmond	17	Marist	2	Carlaw Park # 1, 1:30pm
–	27 May	Ponsonby	23	Newton	7	Carlaw Park # 2, 1:30pm
–	27 May	Devonport	5	City	3	Devonport, 1:30pm
Round 6	3 June	Marist	18	City	11	Carlaw Park # 2, 1:30pm
–	3 June	Ponsonby	5	Devonport	3	Auckland Domain, 1:30pm
–	3 June	Richmond	17	Newton	11	Auckland Domain, 3pm
Round 7	17 June	Newton	16	City	0	Carlaw Park # 2, 1:30pm
–	17 June	Ponsonby	0	Richmond	0	Mount Albert, 3pm
–	17 June	Devonport	3	Marist	0	Auckland Domain, 1:45pm
Round 8	24 June	Marist	8	Ponsonby	0	Carlaw Park # 2, 1:30pm
–	24 June	Richmond	24	City	0	Auckland Domain, 1:30pm
–	24 June	Devonport	5	Newton	0	Auckland Domain, 3pm
Round 9	1 July	Ponsonby	15	City	0	Carlaw Park # 2, 1:30pm
–	1 July	Newton	3	Marist	0	Auckland Domain, 3pm
–	1 July	Devonport	3	Richmond	0	Auckland Domain, 2pm
Round 10	8 July	Newton	14	Ponsonby	9	Carlaw Park # 2, 1:30pm
–	8 July	Devonport	7	City	0	Auckland Domain, 1:30pm
–	8 July	Marist	23	Richmond	9	Auckland Domain, 3pm

=== Stallard Cup knockout competition ===
Devonport defeated Richmond in the Stallard Cup final.

1933 Stallard Cup Results
	Date		Score		Score	Venue
Round 1	29 July	Marist	13	City	3	Auckland Domain, 3pm
–	29 July	Devonport	20	Newton	10	Carlaw Park #2, 3pm
–	29 July	Richmond	12	Ponsonby	5	Carlaw Park #2, 1:30pm
Semi-final	5 Aug	Richmond	14	Marist	8	Carlaw Park #2, 3pm
Final	19 Aug	Devonport	5	Richmond	4	Carlaw Park #2, 3pm

=== Reserve grade challenge round ===
Reserve Grade Challenge Round Results
	Date		Score		Score	Venue
Round 1	19 Aug	Marist	8	City	5	Carlaw Park # 2, 1:45pm
–	19 Aug	Newton	?	Ponsonby	?	Carlaw Park # 1, 2:30pm
Round 2	2 Sep	Richmond	?	Newton	?	Carlaw Park # 2, 1:45pm
–	2 Sep	Devonport	?	Marist	?	Carlaw Park # 2, 3:15pm
–	2 Sep	Ponsonby	?	City	?	Auckland Domain, 3pm
Round 3	9 Sep	Devonport	15	City	0	Carlaw Park # 2, 1:45pm
–	9 Sep	Richmond	10	Ponsonby	9	Carlaw Park # 2, 2:30pm
–	9 Sep	Newton	?	Marist	?	Carlaw Park # 2, 3:15pm
Round 4	16 Sep	Newton	13	City	5	Carlaw Park # 2, 1:45pm
–	16 Sep	Marist	5	Richmond	0	Carlaw Park # 2, 2:30pm
–	16 Sep	Devonport	?	Ponsonby	?	Carlaw Park # 2, 3:15pm

== Other club matches and lower grades ==
=== Lower grade clubs ===
The Davis Cup for all junior clubs was won by Richmond Rovers with the following points: Richmond Rovers 171, Marist Old Boys 129, Devonport United 63, Papakura 60, City Rovers 58, Newton Rangers 46, Point Chevalier 46, Otahuhu Rovers 40, Ponsonby United 37, Northcote & Birkenhead Ramblers 37, Ellerslie United 37, Mangere 29, Mount Albert United 25, Akarana 25, Glenora 18, Manukau 18, New Lynn 12, Avondale 0.

==== 2nd Grade (Wright Cup) ====
The final of the Second Grade between Māngere United and Ōtāhuhu Rovers was played at Carlaw Park as the curtain raiser to the Auckland v North Auckland representative match on 12 August. Māngere won by 11 points to 8. Māngere also won the Foster Shield by winning the knockout competition when they defeated Ōtāhuhu 24-8 in the final at Sturges Park in Ōtāhuhu after beating Point Chevalier 15-3 in the semi final. In an astonishing result for the time the Māngere 2nd Grade team defeated Manukau by 98 points to 0. It was rare for teams to score more than 50 points in a match let along run up a score of that size. On September 16 the Point Chevalier side played a special match against a side from Riverhead. Riverhead had not fielded a side since a short lived Riverhead club formed and played several 3rd grade matches in 1916.

Team	Pld	W	D	L	F	A	Pts
Māngere United	12	10	1	1	189	47	21
Ōtāhuhu Rovers	12	9	1	2	130	42	19
Papakura	12	7	2	3	143	53	16
Point Chevalier	12	5	0	7	69	132	10
Mt Albert United	12	4	1	7	56	105	9
Ellerslie United	12	4	1	7	47	125	9
Manukau Rovers	12	0	0	12	13	120	9

==== 3rd Grade Open (Hayward Shield) ====
Marist won the championship. They also won the knockout final when they beat Glenora 13-5 on September 2 after beating Ponsonby 15-0 in one semi final while Glenora beat Māngere in the other semi final 13-3. On August 26 Mt Albert played a friendly match against Ngaruawahia with the result being a 5-5 draw.

Team	Pld	W	D	L	F	A	Pts
Marist Old Boys	17	17	0	0	293	37	34
Richmond Rovers	15	8	1	3	140	65	17
Mt Albert United	15	8	0	5	119	98	16
Glenora	14	8	0	4	102	47	16
Ponsonby United	15	7	1	5	123	100	15
Māngere United	14	2	0	9	77	78	4
New Lynn	13	1	0	7	26	137	2
Papakura	12	1	0	10	49	261	2

==== 3rd Grade Intermediate (Walker Cup) ====
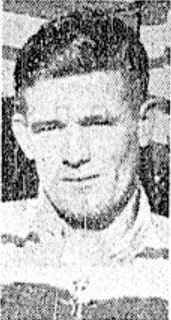
Frank Halloran

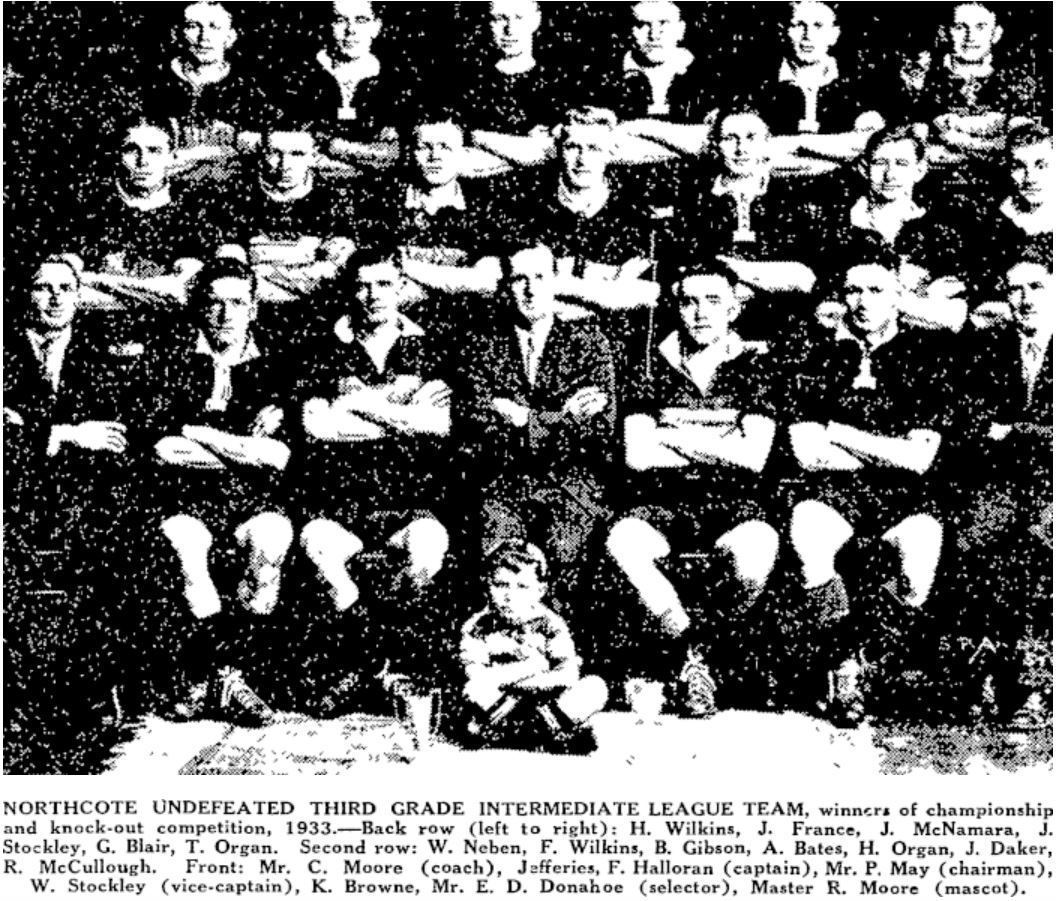
Northcote 3rd Grade Intermediate champion side.

Northcote won the championship with a remarkable unbeaten season where they scored 346 points and didn't have their try line crossed. They were captained by future New Zealand halfback Frank Halloran who at the start of the following season transferred to Ponsonby along with Walter and John Stockley. Walter played for Auckland in 1936 and 1937, captaining the side on occasion. John was killed in Italy during the war in 1943. The 6 points they conceded came from 3 penalties. Northcote also won the Murray Cup when they took out the knockout competition after beating Marist 6-3 in the final on September 30. Marist had beaten Papakura 12-7 in their semi final. The match between Marist and Richmond on 10 June was played as curtain-raiser to the Auckland v Taranaki representative match with Marist winning 23–0. Manukau A withdrew from the competition after 6 rounds. In special matches City drew with Huntly 10-0 on September 9, and Papakura beat Ngaruawahia 26-10 on October 10.

Team	Pld	W	D	L	F	A	Pts
Northcote & Birkenhead Ramblers	15	14	1	0	346	6	29
Marist Old Boys	14	11	1	2	165	36	23
Papakura	14	9	0	5	108	73	18
City Rovers	14	6	1	5	58	94	13
Devonport United	14	6	0	5	71	49	12
Richmond Rovers	15	4	1	8	83	118	9
Manukau Rovers B	14	3	0	10	82	107	6
Manukau Rovers A	5	1	1	1	12	9	3
Akarana	15	1	1	10	12	164	3
Ōtāhuhu Rovers	14	0	2	9	34	171	2

==== 4th Grade (Hospital Cup) ====
Marist A won the championship with Marist B finishing runner up. Marist A also won the knockout competition when they defeated their B side 24-10 in the final on October 7. The match between Akarana and Newton A was played at Carlaw Park on 10 June as a curtain raiser to the Auckland and Taranaki representative match. Newton won the match 19 to 5. On September 30 the Marist A team defeated Ngaruawahia in a friendly match by 30 points to 11.

Team	Pld	W	D	L	F	A	Pts
Marist Old Boys A	21	20	0	1	408	53	41
Marist Old Boys B	18	12	0	5	274	81	24
Newton Rangers A	17	12	0	5	92	53	24
City Rovers	18	11	1	5	169	58	23
Richmond Rovers	18	9	0	6	54	103	18
Ponsonby United	18	8	0	6	111	88	16
Point Chevalier	17	5	1	8	144	95	11
Manukau Rovers	18	5	0	11	88	282	10
Akarana	14	3	2	9	91	106	8
Devonport United	17	2	1	8	51	121	5
Newton Rangers B	18	2	1	10	40	167	5
Northcote & Birkenhead Ramblers	18	1	0	11	23	240	2

==== 5th Grade (Endean Shield) ====
Similarly to the 4th grade competition where 2 Marist sides dominated the competition, the 5th grade competition saw the 2 Richmond sides head the table with the Richmond B team winning the championship. Richmond B also won the knockout competition when they defeated Ellerslie A in the final on September 16 by 3 points to 0. Several teams withdrew from the competition in the latter stages including Northcote, Ellerslie, New Lynn, and Point Chevalier.

Team	Pld	W	D	L	F	A	Pts
Richmond Rovers B	16	14	0	2	78	28	28
Richmond Rovers A	16	13	0	3	219	37	26
Ellerslie United A	15	8	0	4	193	74	16
Papakura	15	7	0	6	133	74	14
City Rovers	14	5	0	6	41	36	10
Point Chevalier	14	4	0	5	64	54	8
Northcote & Birkenhead Ramblers	11	1	0	6	12	44	2
Akarana	14	0	0	10	14	245	0
New Lynn	13	0	0	7	4	110	0
Ellerslie United B	10	0	0	3	0	56	0

==== 6th Grade (Rhodes Shield) ====
Devonport United were awarded the Rhodes Shield after a 5-5 draw in the last round with the second placed team, Ōtāhuhu on August 19. Previously winners were awarded a banner but a new trophy was awarded following the recent death of former chairman George Rhodes. Ōtāhuhu won the Hammill Cup when they won the knockout competition by getting revenge on Devonport with a 6-5 win on September 16 in the final. They had qualified with a 2-0 win over Richmond a week prior, while Devonport had beaten Manukau 20-0 in their semi final.

Team	Pld	W	D	L	F	A	Pts
Devonport United	14	8	4	2	107	39	20
Ōtāhuhu Rovers	12	7	4	1	69	35	18
Point Chevalier	13	8	1	4	72	44	17
Richmond Rovers	14	5	2	6	119	54	12
Manukau	7	2	0	4	45	62	4
Avondale	12	0	0	12	16	194	0

==== 7th Grade (Myers Cup) ====
Richmond A won the seventh grade title and were also awarded the Harry Johns Memorial Cup, Walker Shield, Lauder Cup, Milicich Cup, Harcourt Cup, and Myers Cup after winning all 14 matches (including knockout matches), scoring 255 points and only conceding 12. They won the knockout competition when they beat Newton 6-0 in the final on September 9 after a 16-0 win over Richmond B in one semi final, with Newton beating Ellerslie 5-4 in their semi final.

Team	Pld	W	D	L	F	A	Pts
Richmond Rovers A	12	12	0	0	233	12	24
Devonport United	11	5	1	4	56	39	11
Newton Rangers	11	4	1	5	38	86	9
Richmond Rovers B	11	3	0	6	37	135	6
Ellerslie United	11	0	0	9	25	123	0

==== Schoolboys Grade (Walmsley Shield) ====
Avondale won the championship after beating City 6-3 in what was essentially the final on July 29. There were 7 results not reported so the standings are slightly incomplete. Ellerslie won the Davis Cup for the knockout competition with a 14-5 win over Richmond on September 23. Ellerslie had beaten City on one semi final while Richmond beat Avondale in the other. The match between Devonport and Northcote on 10 June was played at Carlaw Park as curtain raiser to the Auckland v Taranaki match. A seven-a-side competition was also run with the matches played at Carlaw Park.

Team	Pld	W	D	L	F	A	Pts
Avondale	11	9	0	0	79	14	18
City	10	8	1	1	71	20	17
Ellerslie	10	2	1	5	34	37	5
Northcote	11	2	0	5	23	88	4
Richmond	10	1	1	6	34	49	3
Devonport	10	0	0	4	8	41	0

==== Midweek Competition ====
- Midweek League: Amalgamated Theatres A, Amalgamated Theatres B, Atta Taxis (Cabs), Checker Taxis, City Markets, Railway Locos, Seamen's Union, Victoria United (Markets)

==== House Matches ====
On Saturdays several business teams competed in friendly matches. These include W. Lovett's Limited, Auckland Gas Company, McKendrick Bros, Bycroft's, Miller Paterson & Lees, Australian Waste Products, A.J. Entrican, Star Office, Browne and Geddes. Then on September 30 a friendly match was played between National Reserve Ambulance and Auckland Ambulance with the National side win, 16-3.

=== Other notable matches ===
It was common for non senior clubs to request that higher profile matches be played on their suburban ground in order to help grow the rugby league code in their area. Ellerslie requested one such match to be played on the Ellerslie Reserve and on 5 August with the Newton and Ponsonby senior teams, who had both been knocked out of the Roope Rooster the previous week, playing a match there. It was complained during the week following the match that Ponsonby had largely fielded a junior team and the match would have done “harm rather than good to the code”. The Board of Control was going to be asked to have Ponsonby account for the “failure”. The City Rovers team travelled to New Plymouth to play the local Taranaki side and ran out 29–22 winners with Bill Turei scoring 5 tries.

==== Taranaki v City (Auckland) ====
City winger Bill Turei scored five tries for them with Puti Tipene Watene converting three of their seven tries. The others were scored by five eighth Ben Davidson and halfback Robert Alderton. Taranaki scored four tries including one to Doug McLeay who had previously played for Ponsonby. Jack McLeod played in the loose forwards for Taranaki and later transferred to Auckland and joined the Richmond club in 1937 where he would gain selection for New Zealand playing eight times for them in 1937 and 1938. Cliff Hunt kicked a drop goal for Taranaki and would also go on to represent New Zealand in two matches in 1935. The match was refereed by Gordon Hooker who played for New Zealand in 1909.

9 September	Taranaki	22–29	City (Auckland)	Western Park, New Plymouth
2:00	Try: G Hall, Price, G Moorhead, Doug McLeay; Con: R Arnold; Pen: R Arnold 2 Drop: Cliff Hunt, C Bedford		Try: Bill Turei 5, Robert Alderton, Ben Davidson; Con: Steve Watene 3 Drop: Bill Turei	Referee: Gordon Hooker

==== Hikurangi & Whangarei City Combined v Ponsonby ====
On September 23 the Ponsonby senior side joined to Hikurangi in Northland to play a combined local side at the Hikurangi Recreation Park. The side was captained by Lou Hutt and coached by Frank Delgrosso.

23 September	Hikurangi & Whangarei City Combined	10-23	Ponsonby	Hikurangi Recreation Park, Hikurangi
3:00	Try: Eddie Cunningham 2 Pen: Claude Hamilton 2		Try: Arthur Kay, Eric Midgley, George Whye, Lou Hutt, Lewis; Con: Lewis 3 Pen: Lewis	Referee: J Petterson

List of Matches
	Date		Score		Score	Venue
Pre season exhibition match	22 April	Marist	9	Devonport	2	Waikaraka Park
Exhibition match	5 Aug	Newton	?	Ponsonby	?	Ellerslie, 3pm
Schoolboy representative match	19 Aug	Auckland Schoolboys	9	Northland Schoolboys	21	Carlaw Park # 1, 12:45pm
Junior exhibition match	2 Sep	Whangarei Juniors	9	Marist Juniors	12	Hikurangi

== Auckland representative fixtures ==
Auckland played their first representative match of the season against Taranaki at Carlaw Park on 9 June. It was between Round 6 and Round 7 of the club competition. It was decided not to play the annual inter-island fixture because the cost of assembling and bringing the South Island side would be in the region of 300 pounds and with the depression in full swing it was not considered viable financially.

=== Auckland v Taranaki (inter-provincial match) ===
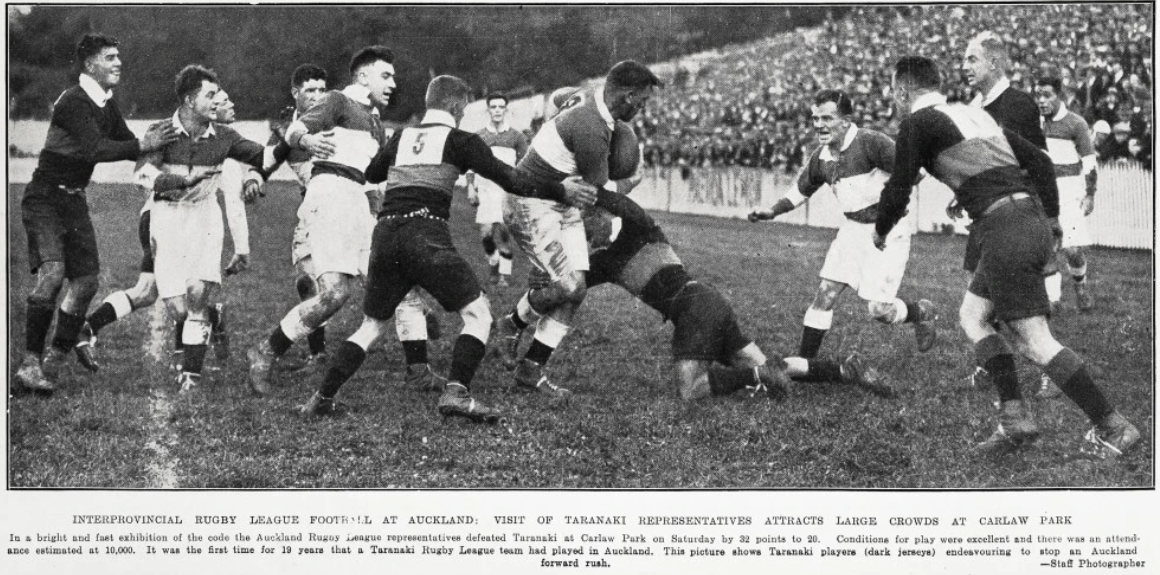

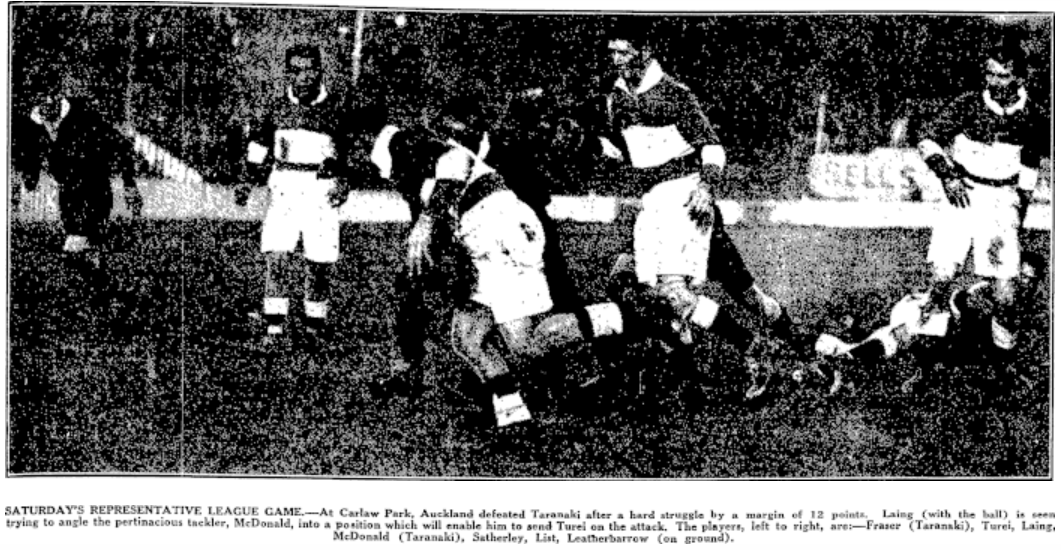

10 June	Auckland	32–20	Taranaki	Carlaw Park 1
3:00	Try: Bill Turei 3, Roy Bright 3, Dick Smith, Jim Laird; Con: Dick Smith 4		Try: Cliff Hunt, J Arnold, Jack McLeod, D McLeay (obstruction try); Con: J Fraser 3 Pen: J Fraser	Attendance: 10,000; Referee: Maurice Wetherill

=== Auckland trial match ===
15 July	B Team	16–9	A Team	Carlaw Park
1:30	Try: Edwin Abbot, B Smith, Trevor Hall, Arnold Porteous; Con: Arnold Porteous 2		Try: Huck Flanagan, Roy Bright, R Pope	Attendance: 10,000; Referee: Les Bull

=== Auckland v South Auckland (Waikato) (Northern Union C.C.) ===
15 July	Auckland	0–14	South Auckland	Carlaw Park 1
3:00			Try: George Tittleton, Don Pitt 2, J Fleming; Con: George Tittleton	Referee: Percy Rogers

=== Auckland v Taranaki (inter-provincial match: Walmsley Shield) ===
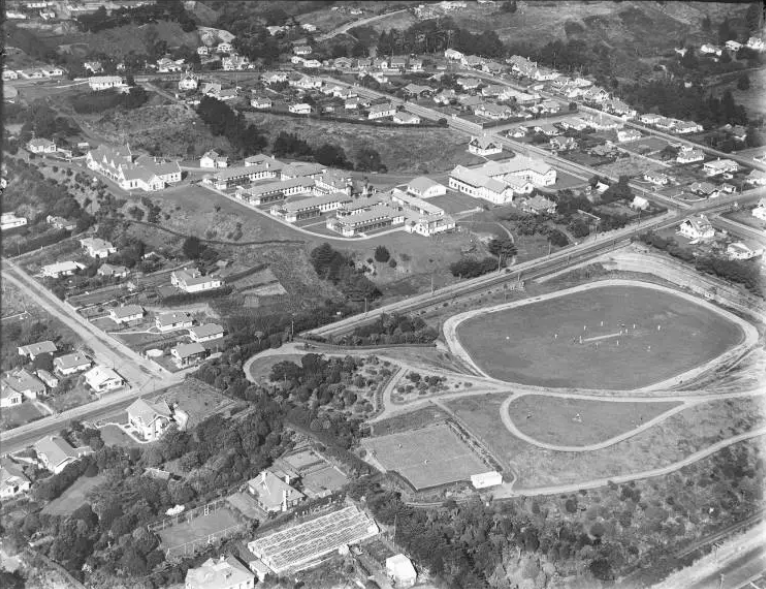
Western Park, New Plymouth in 1929.

Auckland were not at full strength for this match with the Roope Rooster semi-final between Richmond and Marist being played on the same day in Auckland. J Cowley from the Taranaki side broke his leg during the match which Auckland won 25-17 before a crowd of 2,000. Doug McLeay the former Ponsonby player scored one of Taranaki's tries and he would later transfer back to Auckland.

5 August	Taranaki	17–25	Auckland	Western Park, New Plymouth
3:00	Try: Doug McLeay, J Cowley, J Fraser; Con: J Fraser 2 Pen: J Fraser 2		Try: Albert Laing, Bill Turei, Trevor Hall 2, John Donald, Roy Bright, Alex Nathan; Con: Bill Turei, Albert Laing	Attendance: 2,000; Referee: Gordon Hooker

=== Auckland v North Auckland (inter-provincial match) ===
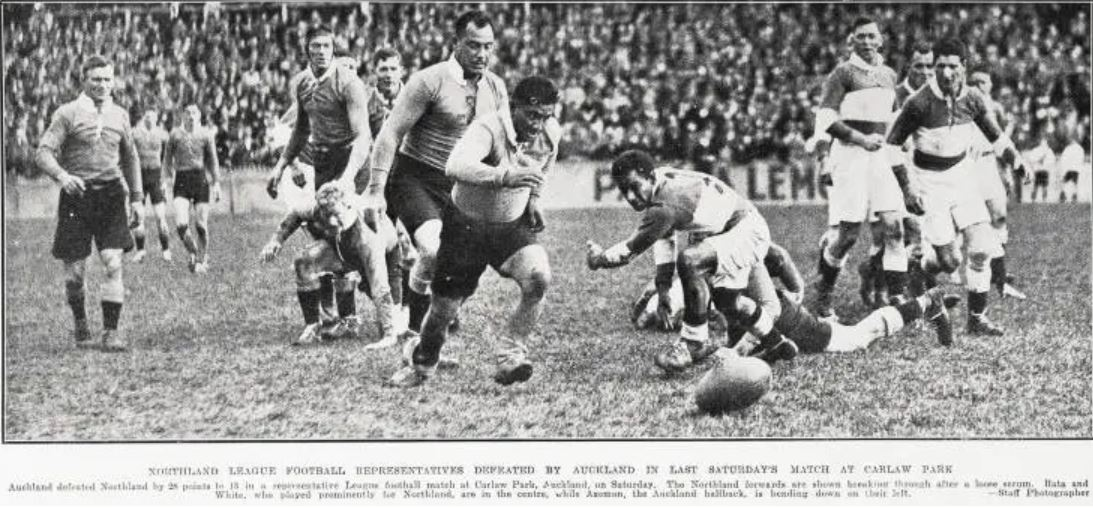
Rata (Northland) leading the chase for the ball with White behind. Vincent Axman is stopped over and turning for Auckland. Cliff Satherley is on the right following up.

Jim Rukutai was appointed coach for the match and remained in the position until the conclusion of the season. There were however issues with attendance at trainings over the coming weeks.

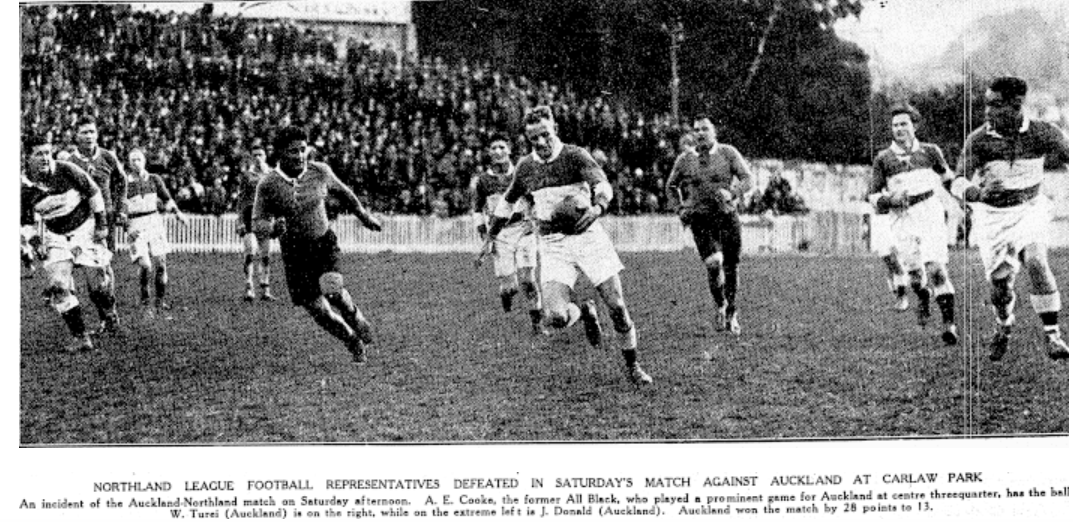

12 August	Auckland	28–13	North Auckland	Carlaw Park 1
3:00	Try: Roy Bright 3, Bert Cooke, Stan Clark, Cliff Satherley; Con: Norm Campbell 5		Try: R Cunningham, Bill Rata, C White; Con: C Hamilton 2	Referee: Vic Simpson

=== Auckland v West Coast (inter-provincial match) ===
26 August	Auckland	28–22	West Coast	Carlaw Park 1
3:00	Try: Roy Bright, Bert Cooke 3, Cliff Satherley, Bert Cooke; Con: Norm Campbell 5		Try: J Devonport, Johnny Dodds, T O’Connor, Jim Calder, G Newton 2 Con: Johnny Dodds; Pen: Jim Calder	Attendance: 8,000; Referee: Percy Rogers

=== Auckland v Hawkes Bay (inter-provincial match) ===
The Hawke's Bay side was coached by Maurice Wetherill. The Hawkes Bay team was captained by five eighth Rua John Francis Seal who had played for Hawkes Bay rugby. The side was selected by George Frater who played for Oldham from 1896 to 1905. Frater was born in Scotland before playing professionally in England. He later moved to New Zealand and refereed games in the Hawkes Bay. In 1913 he refereed the match between Auckland and Nelson at Victoria Park.

2 September	Auckland	47–17	Hawke's Bay	Carlaw Park 1
3:15	Try: Roy Bright, Hec Brisbane 2, Harry Wayne 2, Bert Cooke, Cliff Satherley, Ray Lawless 3, Trevor Hall; Con: Norm Campbell 4, Hec Brisbane, John Donald 2		Try: H.G. Smith, H Brady 2 Con: R.E. Smith 3 Pen: R.E. Smith	Referee: Les Bull

=== Auckland v South Auckland (inter-provincial match) ===
Claude List came on for Bert Cooke after Cooke was injured. He was taken to hospital to have his ribs checked but was able to return home the same day.

9 September	Auckland	17–5	South Auckland	Carlaw Park 1
3:15	Try: Roy Bright 2, Stan Prentice, Trevor Hall, Claude List; Con: Norm Campbell		Try: McBurney; Pen: George Tittleton	Referee: Vic Simpson

=== Auckland representative matches played and scorers ===
No	Name	Club Team	Play	Tries	Con	Pen	Points
1	Roy Bright	Ponsonby	7	11	0	0	33
2	Norm Campbell	Marist	4	0	15	0	30
3=	Trevor Hall	Newton	5	5	0	0	15
3=	Bert Cooke	Richmond	4	5	0	0	15
5	Bill (Rauaroa Tangaroapeau) Turei	City	4	4	1	0	13
6	Dick Smith	Devonport	1	1	4	0	11
7=	Cliff Satherley	Richmond	6	3	0	0	9
7=	Ray Lawless	Richmond	4	3	0	0	9
9	Hec Brisbane	Marist	4	2	1	0	8
10	John Donald	Devonport	5	1	2	0	7
11	Harry Wayne	City	3	2	0	0	6
12	Albert Laing	Devonport	3	1	1	0	5
13=	Stan Clark	City	6	1	0	0	3
13=	Stan Prentice	Richmond	4	1	0	0	3
13=	Claude List	Marist	3	1	0	0	3
13=	Jim Laird	Marist	2	1	0	0	3
13=	Alex Nathan	Newton	1	1	0	0	3
18	Bert Leatherbarrow	Devonport	5	0	0	0	0
18	Wilf Hassan	Marist	4	0	0	0	0
18	Gordon Campbell	Marist	4	0	0	0	0
18	Len Schultz	Marist	3	0	0	0	0
18	Bill Telford	Richmond	2	0	0	0	0
18	William McLaughlin	City	2	0	0	0	0
18	Vincent Axmann	City	2	0	0	0	0
18	Ted Brimble	Newton	2	0	0	0	0
18	Charles Dunne	Marist	1	0	0	0	0
18	Allan Seagar	Devonport	1	0	0	0	0
18	Leslie Oliff	Devonport	1	0	0	0	0

== Annual general meetings and club news ==
- Auckland Rugby League held their annual meeting in the Chamber of Commerce on Swanson Street, on Monday, 10 April.
- Auckland Rugby League Junior Management Committee The Junior Management delegate Mr. Wilkie reported that 200 new junior registrations had been received and approved. At a meeting of the Board of Control it was decided to approve the junior management committee's recommendation for an amendment to Rule 36 to read:-"The junior management (comprising nine members unattached to any club, to be elected annually by clubs which enter and play in the competitions one or more teams other than senior teams; one representative of the Referees' Association, and a secretary who shall be elected by the said committee)- the junior management committee shall frame rules and regulations and submit same to the management committee of the Auckland Rugby League for approval or otherwise, for the control and guidance of junior football".
- Auckland Rugby League Primary School Management Committee annual meeting was presided over by Mr. W. J, Hammill. The annual report stated that the reduction of the number of teams to nine resulted in an elevated level of play. It was reported that new teams were likely to enter from Ponsonby, Manukau, and Marist. Mr. L. Rout was elected the secretary of the Primary Schools management committee, with Mr. R. E. Newport, the deputy-Mayor of Newmarket, elected chairman once again.
- Auckland Rugby League Referees Association held their annual meeting on 27 March. Mr. A. Ball presided over the meeting. It was felt that the more intensive organisation and selection had led to a marked improvement in the standard of refereeing. There had been less criticism of referees and more co-operation by officials, clubs, and players. Mr. A. Ball was elected president, and Mr. L. Bull deputy chairman.
- Akarana Rugby League Football Club placed advertisements in the Herald and Star seeking players for all grades.
- City Rovers held their 21st annual meeting at Carlaw Park on Tuesday, 21 March. There was some discussion about whether the senior clubs should request stronger representation on the management committee of the Auckland Rugby League. It was decided to convene a meeting of senior clubs “with a view to getting full co-operation”. The financial statement from the club showed that they were in profit by £64. The meeting then noted the performance of its senior team and fifth and third grade teams, and the achievement of Steve Watene, and Ben Davidson who had been selected to play against the touring England team in 1932. Mr. C. Waugh was elected president, and Mr. G. Reid was elected vice-president. The vice-president Mr. C. Waugh died in the week prior to the official beginning of the season. The City team travelled to New Plymouth to take on a combined Taranaki team on September 9. They were victorious by 29 points to 22 with Bill Turei scoring five tries and kicking a goal.
- Devonport United League Football Club held their annual general meeting at the Labour Rooms (above Hellaby's) on Wednesday, 29 March. There were 80 members in attendance with Mr. J. A. Ferguson presiding. The report congratulated the senior team for winning the championship. Their schoolboys won the Kiely Cup for the best average amongst the juniors. Mr. W.D. Meiklejohn was elected Patron, and Mr. Kiely was elected vice-patron. Their end of season annual dance was held at the Pirate Ship at Milford on 28 October.
- Ellerslie United League Football Club held their annual meeting in the Training Shed, Findlay Street, Ellerslie on Monday, 20 March. Mr. J. McInnarny presided over the meeting which had a large number of members. Mr. W.J. Jordan, M.P. was elected Patron, and Mr. J. McInnarny was elected president.
- Glenora had their application for financial consideration from the Auckland Rugby League recognised.
- Marist Brothers Old Boys League Football Club held their annual meeting at Donovan's Gymnasium, Manukau Road, Parnell on Thursday, 23 March. Between eighty and ninety members attended. The report stated that the 1932 season had been the most successful season financially and in terms of results in the club's history. The club had won the Roope Rooster, the Stormont Shield, and the Max Jaffe Charity Cup. In addition seven players wore the New Zealand jersey (Hec Brisbane, Claude List, Gordon Campbell, Jim Laird, Norm Campbell, Alan Clarke, and Wilf Hassan). The balance sheet showed a credit of £86 13/9. His Lordship Bishop Liston was elected president, and Mr. E. Lahman was elected vice-president. The Marist 4th Grade team had a particularly strong season. They played a match in Ngaruawahia where they defeated the local 3rd Grade Open team by 32 points to 11. At that point in the season they had played 17, won 16, and scored 367 points while only conceding 54.
- Māngere United League Football Club held their seventeenth annual meeting with Mr. S. Rickards presiding. The annual report made mention of the Second Grade team which had come 4th in the championship and won the knockout competition. Mr. S.W. House was elected Patron, and Mr. Rickards President.
- Manukau Rugby League Club held a Special Meeting at the Orpheum Theatre, Onehunga on Thursday, 16 February. They asked for the use of three playing areas on the recreation reserve in Onehunga. The Onehunga Council granted them the use of two which is what was set aside for rugby league players three years earlier. Their annual meeting was held at the Onehunga Ex-Servicemen's clubrooms on Thursday 9 March. The secretary read a lengthy report about the work done by the organising committee during the offseason and reported bright prospects for the future of the club. They were in credit £11 4/3. Mr. W.J. Jordan, MP was elected patron, with Mr. F. Murray elected president. They held a further special general meeting in Kelvin Hall, Queen Street, Onehunga, on Thursday, 6 April. The club wrote a letter to the Onehunga Borough Council requesting that dressing accommodation be made available on the Waikaraka Recreation Reserve. They submitted plans for a proposed building and with matches starting soon and the Manukau Rovers Rugby Football Club having been granted exclusive use of the existing dressing pavilion the question was urgent. They also asked for permission to hold a league carnival two Saturdays later and to charge admission to the reserve when exhibition matches would be played between Devonport and Marist. They had their application for financial consideration from the Auckland Rugby League recognised.
- Mt. Albert United Rugby League Football Club held their annual meeting in the King George Hall, Mt Albert Terminus on Thursday, 9 March. They placed advertisements in the newspapers for the annual practice which was held at Morningside Reserve on Saturday 8 April.
- New Lynn League Football Club advertised in the newspapers for players to attend a practice match to be played at the ground adjacent to the New Lynn Council Chambers, Great North Road. The New Lynn club was granted permission to adopt the royal blue colour for its jerseys for the coming season.
- Newton Rangers Football Club held their 23rd annual meeting at the Y.M.C.A on Monday, 20 March. The meeting saw “a large and enthusiastic” attendance with the financial statement showing the position of the club to be healthy. Mr. W. Monteith was elected Patron, Mr. A. Blakely vice patron, and Mr. John A. Lee M.P. was elected president. On 7 November Newton held their annual social with "over 200 members, supporters and friends participating". The following prizes were presented by chairman Mr. W. Badley: Most Improved player – A. Porteus, Best Back – Claude Dempsey, Best Forward – C. Blacklaws, Most Improved Reserve Player – H. Oakley Browne, Most Consistent Reserve Player – C.L. Clemm.
- Northcote and Birkenhead Ramblers League Football Club held their annual meeting in the Victoria Hall, Birkenhead on Monday, 13 March. The league granted the “usual donation for the use of the Northcote and Birkenhead school ground last year” on the recommendation of the junior management committee. The club requested that the municipal ground at Stafford Park be allocated to the two codes on alternate Saturdays, and stated that the club had entered five teams in the competitions. It was decided to allocate the ground equally between the two codes. They celebrated their 23rd anniversary with a dance at the King's Theatre in Northcote on 28 September. On 4 November the Northcote league and rugby codes combined with local cricket, harrier and gymnastic clubs to have a combined sports gathering at Stafford Park. A collection was taken up for charitable purposes. It had been originally scheduled for 14 October but had to be postponed.
- Otahuhu Rugby League Football Club requested use of Sturgess Park, Otahuhu on alternate Saturdays for the season, stating to the Otahuhu Borough Council that they had a strong following in the borough. At an Auckland Rugby League Board of Control meeting prior to the start of the season it was decided to assist the “Otahuhu Rovers Club financially in regard to the use of Sturgess Park, which the club hopes to use one Saturday in every four. The Otahuhu Borough Council and decided to delegate the use of the ground based on the number of teams in each club. As the Otahuhu Rugby Club had 5 teams they would have the ground for 5 Saturdays while the Otahuhu League Club had 3 teams and so would have the ground for 3 Saturdays. They would review this after the matches had been played to see how many teams both clubs still had. Otahuhu requested the use of Sturgess Park on 22 July for a Roope Rooster match to be played there. The Otahuhu Borough Council granted permission for the use of the ground and also that the club could charge patrons for admission but not exceeding 6d per person.
- Papakura Rugby League Football Club annual meeting was presided over by Mr. A. J. Williamson in front of a large attendance. The chairman congratulated the second grade team on winning the championship. Mr. E. C. Foote was elected president, and Mr. S. H. Godden vice-president. The club advertised in the newspaper for tenders to transport the Papakura players from Papakura to Auckland City and suburban football grounds on Saturday afternoons during the season. They had their application for financial consideration from the Auckland Rugby League recognised. In mid July Papakura sent a lengthy letter to the Auckland Rugby League complaining about their best players being poached by senior clubs. ARL chairman Mr. G. Grey Campbell agreed that it was a hardship on clubs which had no senior team. He said it was only reasonable that a transfer fee might be paid by senior clubs to the club losing players. Papakura suggested that junior clubs could be groups with senior clubs, thus giving junior players the opportunity for promotion. It was decided that the letter should be forwarded to the junior management committee for a report.
- Point Chevalier League Football Club held their annual meeting at the Sailing Club's Hall on Monday 3 April.
- Ponsonby United Football Club held they annual meeting at Leys Institute, Ponsonby on Monday, 6 March. The meeting discussed the strong performance of the senior team in winning 7 out of 10 matches and finishing runner-up but also commented on some members of the reserve grade team who had shown a failure “to realise the importance of placing club and not team interests first”. This was in reference to the 1932 season where several players under the approval of their coach had played for the reserve grade team at the Auckland Domain before belatedly making their way to Carlaw Park where kick off was 20 minutes late. The Ponsonby Club then suspended several of the players and removed the coach from all his positions in the club. Frank Delgrosso who had played for Ponsonby since 1919 was presented with a life membership medallion and was awarded the Mr. J. Arneil juns medal for the most consistent back during the season.
- Richmond Rovers Football Club held their annual meeting in the Gaiety Hall, Surrey Crescent on Monday, 20 March. Over 100 members were in attendance at the annual meeting with Mr. B.W. Davis presiding. Reference was made to the loss of Harry Johns the previous season. He was a playing member of the club who had risen through the ranks and debuted for the Senior team. He was already under consideration for senior representative teams and a promising career lay ahead. Sadly he was killed following a boxing match at the Auckland Town Hall and was buried at Waikumete Cemetery. In January Bert Cooke received an offer from the Balmain League Club in Sydney. It was reported that he was anxious to play with them. The two parties could not reach an agreement however as Cooke wanted £6 5s a week, or a position with that value, for the two full years. The Balmain club found these demands to be too prohibitive. Cooke moved away from Auckland for work purposes down to Waihou but said that he had kept himself fit by playing some “house” rugby union games and he returned to Auckland to play for Richmond in the Roope Rooster knockout competition towards the end of the club season. On 30 August Mr. James Henry Lawson died. He had been vice-chairman of the Richmond club. He was buried at Waikumete Cemetery.
