= Joe Brennan (rugby league) =

Australian rugby league footballer (1908–1949)

Personal information
- Full name: Joseph Richard Brennan
- Born: 26 April 1908 Canterbury, New South Wales
- Died: 23 June 1949 (aged 41) Griffith, New South Wales

Playing information
- Position: Wing
Club
Years	Team	Pld	T	G	FG	P
1931–34	St. George	11	1	5	0	17
1936	South Sydney	1	0	0	0	0
	Total	12	1	5	0	17
- Relatives: Len Brennan (brother)

Joseph Richard Brennan (1908–1949) was an Australian rugby league footballer who played in the 1930s.

== Career ==
Brennan was the elder brother of Len Brennan who also played for St. George and was a schoolboy GPS sprint champion. Brennan played with the Saints for four seasons from 1931 to 1934.

He played one season with Souths in 1936 before retiring from rugby league.

== Death ==
Brennan died from accidental tetanus poisoning in Griffith, New South Wales on 23 June 1949.
