= Alan Sprouster =

Australian rugby league footballer

Personal information
- Full name: Archibald Douglas Sprouster
- Born: 28 February 1910 Chatswood, New South Wales, Australia
- Died: 23 January 1968 (aged 57) Belmont, New South Wales

Playing information
- Position: Second-row
Club
| Years | Team | Pld | T | G | FG | P |
|---|---|---|---|---|---|---|
| 1933 | St. George | 7 | 2 | 0 | 0 | 6 |
- Source: Whittacker/Hudson

Arichibald 'Alan' Sprouster (1910–1968) was an Australian rugby league footballer who played in the 1930s.

Archibald 'Alan' Sprouster played one season of first grade with the St George Dragons in 1933, and he played in the Grand Final of that year.

He finished his career at Junee, New South Wales in the late 1930s.
