= Tom Killiby =

Australian rugby league footballer

Personal information
- Full name: Thomas William Wright Killiby
- Born: 25 May 1898 Sydney, New South Wales, Australia
- Died: 1 October 1963 (aged 65) Sans Souci, New South Wales, Australia

Playing information
- Position: Second-row, Prop, Lock
Club
Years	Team	Pld	T	G	FG	P
1921–33	St. George	51	6	0	0	18

Thomas William Wright Killiby (1898–1963) was an Australian WWI artilleryman and a first grade rugby league player who played in the 1920s and 1930s. He was pioneer player in Sydney with the St. George club at their foundation.

== War Service ==
Born in Sydney, Killiby was a long-time resident of Sans Souci, New South Wales. He was a veteran of World War I and enlisted in the AIF in 1916 before his eighteenth birthday. He was an artilleryman in a light trench mortar battery and embarked for the Western Front in Oct 1916 on HMAT Ceramic. He returned to Sydney at war's end in 1919.

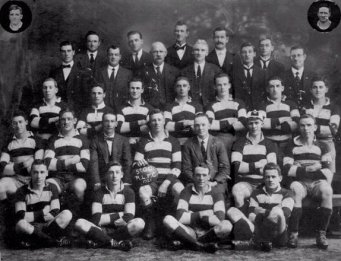
St.George 1921 foundation. Killiby 3rd row 2nd from right

== St George career ==
Killiby was a foundation player for St. George and played ten seasons at the club between 1921-1930 and 1933. He kicked the only goal in St George's first recorded trial match against Glebe.A prop forward, Killiby played in the Saints' first finals appearance in 1927.

Upon his playing retirement Killiby stayed involved with the club as a trainer, masseur and gear steward. He was a trainer for the Dragons' 1941 premiership winning side and also trained New South Wales representative teams during the 1940s and 1950s.

== Death ==
Killiby died on 1 October 1963, aged 65 and is buried at Woronora Cemetery, Sutherland.
