= Len Brennan =

Australian rugby league footballer (1911-1943)

- Len Brennan. St.George 1933

Personal information
- Full name: Leonard Reginald Brennan
- Born: 26 February 1911 Kogarah, New South Wales, Australia
- Died: 8 June 1943 (aged 32) Mediterranean Sea, off French Tunisia

Playing information
- Position: Wing
Club
Years	Team	Pld	T	G	FG	P
1932–34	St George Dragons	40	20	1	0	62
- Source: Whiticker/Hudson
- Relatives: Joe Brennan (brother)
- Military career
- Allegiance: Australia
- Branch: Royal Australian Air Force
- Service years: 1941-1943
- Rank: Flight Sergeant
- Unit: 104 Squadron
- Conflicts: World War II

Leonard Reginald 'Len' Brennan (1911–1943) was an Australian rugby league footballer who played in the 1930s. He was a casualty of World War II.

== Career ==
Len Brennan was a local from Ramsgate, New South Wales, and played three seasons of first grade with the St George Dragons between 1932 and 1934, including the 1933 Grand Final. Len also played with his oldest brother Joe Brennan at St. George during his career. They were both wingers.

== War death ==
Brennan enlisted in the RAAF during 1941 and became a Flight Sergeant in 104 Squadron. On 8 June 1943, Brennan served as the co-pilot of a Vickers Wellington bomber sent on an operational flight. During the flight, the bomber was shot down, and all aboard save one were killed. An account of the day was written by the survivor, the pilot, Pilot Officer F.E. McLaren.

The aircraft received a direct hit amidships by heavy flak from a flak ship while approaching the target from the sea. I immediately jettisoned the bombs, and set course for Base [sic]. Sergeant Robson was wounded. Although both engines were going the aircraft was unable to maintain height. The inter-com was useless and I decided to ditch. We were about 10 miles from the coast at the time. The aircraft sank in about 20 seconds, but all the crew got out. There was no dinghy. I last saw Sergeant Harris swimming strongly for the coast.

McLaren was picked up by Royal Navy ships at about 2:00 pm the next day, but nobody else survived.
