= Jim Rutherford (rugby league) =

Australian rugby league footballer

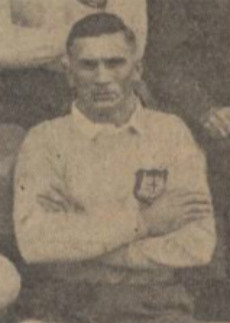
- Jim Rutherford 1933

Personal information
- Full name: James Keith Rutherford
- Born: 7 January 1908 Woodburn, New South Wales, Australia
- Died: 8 October 1982 (aged 74)

Playing information
- Position: Second-row
Club
Years	Team	Pld	T	G	FG	P
1933–37	St. George	47	20	0	0	60
1941	Western Suburbs	4	0	0	0	0
	Total	51	20	0	0	60
Representative
Years	Team	Pld	T	G	FG	P
1933	New South Wales	4	2	0	0	6
1934	NSW City	1	1	0	0	3

James Keith Rutherford (7 January 1908 – 8 October 1982) was an Australian rugby league footballer who played in the 1920s, 1930s and 1940s.

== Playing career ==
Originally from Tumbulgum, New South Wales, Rutherford played five seasons with St. George between 1933-1937.

Rutherford scored the match-winning after-the-bell try for St George in their 1933 semi-final against Eastern Suburbs. Rutherford captained the club during their end-of-season tour of New Zealand that year.

Rutherford played second row in the 1933 Grand Final. He also represented New South Wales on four occasions in 1933, and played from New South Wales City Firsts in 1934.

Rutherford was captain-coach of Young in 1939 and Dubbo in 1940.

He returned to Sydney in 1941, playing one season for Western Suburbs. He enlisted in the AIF in 1942.

== Death ==
Rutherford died on 8 October 1982.
