= Charles Rice (rugby league) =

Australian rugby league footballer

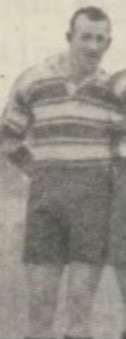
- Charlie Rice in 1935

Personal information
- Full name: Charles Campbell Rice
- Born: 27 August 1907; Adelaide, South Australia, Australia
- Died: 20 July 1993 (aged 85)

Playing information
- Position: Lock, Second-row
Club
Years	Team	Pld	T	G	FG	P
1932–37	St. George	54	5	0	0	15

Charles Campbell Rice (27 August 1907 – 20 July 1993) was an Australian rugby league footballer who played in the 1930s.

== Playing career ==
Rice had a six-year first grade career at the St. George club in the 1930s. A big strapping lock forward, Rice was a crowd favourite during his era at the club. Charlie Rice finished his career at Grenfell, New South Wales in 1938.

== Death ==
Rice died on 20 July 1993.
