= Stan Robinson (rugby league) =

Australian rugby league player

Personal information
- Full name: Stanley Herbert Robinson
- Born: 4 April 1911 Sydney, New South Wales, Australia
- Died: 28 April 1995 (aged 84) Bexley, New South Wales, Australia

Playing information
- Position: Fullback
Club
Years	Team	Pld	T	G	FG	P
1931–37	St. George	70	2	36	0	78
Representative
Years	Team	Pld	T	G	FG	P
1933–35	NSW City	2	0	0	0	0

Stanley Herbert Robinson (1911–1995) was an Australian rugby league player who played in the 1930s.

== Playing career ==
A talented full-back, Robinson played seven seasons with St. George between 1931 and 1937, and played in the 1933 Grand Final losing to Newtown 18–5.

He also represented New South Wales City Firsts on two occasions in 1933 and 1935.

In 1935, Robinson played in the historic blowout winning 91–6 against Canterbury at Earl Park, Arncliffe. As of the 2023 NRL season, this remains the biggest recorded victory by a team and the biggest winning margin.

== Death ==
Robinson died on 28 April 1995, aged 83.

== Career stats ==
=== Club ===
Season	Team	Appearances	Tries	Goals	Goal-kicking percentage	Field goals	Points
1931 NSWRFL Season	St. George Dragons	3	-	-	-	-	-
1932 NSWRFL Season	St. George Dragons	8	1	1	-	-	5
1933 NSWRFL Season	St. George Dragons	15	-	11	-	-	22
1934 NSWRFL Season	St. George Dragons	14	-	14	-	-	28
1935 NSWRFL Season	St. George Dragons	16	1	4	-	-	11
1936 NSWRFL Season	St. George Dragons	10	-	6	-	-	12
1937 NSWRFL Season	St. George Dragons	4	-	-	-	-	-

=== Representative ===
Years	Team	Appearances	Tries	Goals	Goal-kicking percentage	Field goals	Points
1933, 1935	NSW City	2	-	-	-	-	-
