= Clarrie =

Clarrie is a masculine given name, a diminutive form of Clarence. It may refer to:

== Sports ==
- Clarrie Answerth (1901–1981), Australian rules footballer
- Clarrie Bacon (1889–1954), English footballer
- Clarrie Bourton (1908–1981), English footballer
- Clarrie Calwell (1896–1975), Australian rules footballer
- Clarrie Clowe (1893–1980), Australian rules footballer
- Clarrie Curyer (1912–2003), Australian rules footballer
- Clarrie Dall (1887–1953), Australian rules footballer
- Clarrie Fahy (1898–1963), Australian rugby league administrator
- Clarrie Featherston (1892–1964), Australian rules footballer
- Clarrie Fleay (1886–1955), Australian cricketer
- Clarrie Gordon (1917–1983), New Zealand boxer
- Clarrie Grimmett (1891–1980), New Zealand cricketer
- Clarrie Hall (1890–1976), Australian rules footballer
- Clarrie Heard (1906–1990), New Zealand swimmer
- Clarrie Hearn (1905–1981), Australian rules footballer
- Clarrie Hindson (1907–2002), Australian rules footballer
- Clarrie Horder (1890–1960), Australian rugby league player
- Clarrie Ives (1890–1956), Australian rugby league footballer
- Clarrie Jeffreys (1932–2020), Australian rugby league footballer
- Clarrie Jordan (1922–1992), English footballer
- Clarrie Jordon (1909–1965), Australian rules footballer
- Clarrie Kemp (1913–1943), Australian rugby league footballer
- Clarrie Lane (born 1934), former Australian rules footballer
- Clarrie Lethlean (1900–1969), Australian rules footballer
- Clarrie Lonsdale (1906–1971), Australian rules footballer
- Clarrie Morelli (1906–1997), Australian rules footballer
- Clarrie Nolan (1904–1998), Australian rules footballer
- Clarrie O'Connor (1909–1969), Australian rules footballer
- Clarrie Polson (fl. 1920–1926), New Zealand rugby league player
- Clarrie Prentice (1891–1948), Australian rugby union and rugby league footballer
- Clarrie Riordan (1917–1995), Australian rules footballer
- Clarrie Roberts (1888–1966), Australian rules footballer
- Clarrie Scrutton (1899–1982), Australian rules footballer
- Clarrie Semmel (1910–2000), Australian rules footballer
- Clarrie Sherry (1895–1977), Australian rules footballer
- Clarrie Shields (1914–1998), Australian rules footballer
- Clarrie Stevenson (1910–1984), Australian rugby league footballer
- Clarrie Sullivan (1898–1978), Australian rules footballer
- Clarrie Swenson (1923–2003), Australian rules footballer
- Clarrie Tolson (1911–1989), Australian rules footballer
- Clarrie Tye (1892–1936), Australian rugby league player
- Clarrie Uren (1900–1968), Australian rules footballer
- Clarrie Vontom (1914–2000), Australian rules footballer
- Clarrie Wallach (1889–1918), Australian representative rugby union player and World War I officer
- Clarrie White (1914–1991), Australian rules footballer
- Clarrie Williams (1933–2017), English football goalkeeper
- Clarrie Woodfield (1901–1968), Australian rules footballer
- Clarrie Wyatt (1904–1986), Australian rules footballer

== Other ==
- Clarrie Earl (1913–1998), Australian politician
- Clarrie Fallon (c. 1890–1950), Australian trade unionist
- Clarrie Harders (1915–1997), Australian public servant
- Clarrie Hermes (1921–1991), Australian barrister and magistrate
- Clarrie Isaacs (1948–2003), Australian Aboriginal activist
- Clarrie MacKinnon (born 1945/6), Canadian politician
- Clarrie Martin (1900–1953), Australian politician
- Clarrie McCue (1927–1992), Australian meteorologist
- Clarrie Millar (1925–2017), Australian politician
- Clarrie O'Shea (1906–1988), Australian trade unionist
- Clarrie Robertson (1902–1974), Australian politician

== See also ==
- Reginald Clarry (1882–1945), British politician
- Clary
