= Clary =

Clary may refer to:

== Places ==
- Clary, Nord, France, a commune
- Clary, Virginia, United States, a census-designated place
- Palazzo Clary, a palace in Venice, Italy

== Plants ==
- A common name of plants in the sage genus, Salvia, notably:
  - biennial clary or just clary Salvia sclarea
  - annual clary Salvia viridis
  - Balkan clary Salvia nemorosa
  - meadow clary Salvia pratensis
  - silvery clary Salvia argentea
  - sticky clary Salvia glutinosa
  - whorled clary Salvia verticillata
  - wild clary Salvia verbenacea

== People ==
- Clary (surname), a list of people
- Clarence Clary Anderson (1911–1988), American football and baseball player and coach
- Clary Hood Smith (1928-2019), American politician

== Other uses ==
- MV Clary, two ships with this name
- Clary Fray, the main character of the book series The Mortal Instruments
- Clary Corporation (later Clary Datacomp), makers of the Clary DE-60 desk computer

== See also ==
- Clary Mill, Maine, United States
- Clary Ranch, Nebraska, United States, an archaeological site
- Clary-Aldringen family, a noble family
- Clarrie, a list of people with the given name
