= Clery =

Clery may refer to:

- Clery Act (1990), a law in the United States
- Clerys, an Irish department store

== People with the surname ==
- Jean-Baptiste Cléry (1759–1809), personal valet to King Louis XVI
- Arthur Clery (1879–1932), Irish politician and professor
- Jeanne Clery (1966–1986), whose death was the impetus for the Clery Act
- Corinne Cléry (born 1950), French actress

== See also ==
- Clary (disambiguation)
- Ó Cléirigh
- Cléry (disambiguation)
