= Silver Sage =

Silver Sage may refer to:

- Salvia argentea, a biennial or short-lived perennial plant
- Silver Sage, Fort Worth, Texas
