= 1946–47 in English football =

Football in England
- Season: 1946–47

Men's football
- First Division: Liverpool
- Second Division: Manchester City
- FA Cup: Charlton Athletic

The 1946–47 season was the 67th season of competitive football in England.

== Overview ==
The 1946–47 season was the first to feature a full football programme since the 1938–39 campaign. Eighty-eight teams competed over four divisions. Liverpool went top of the First Division with a 2–1 away win over Wolverhampton Wanderers on 31 May 1947. Wolves could have clinched their first league title with a victory in that match, but instead the title was won by Liverpool for the fifth time. Due to a bitter winter that postponed many fixtures Liverpool had to wait until the match between Stoke City and Sheffield United on 14 June. A win for Stoke would see them take the title on goal average; however, Sheffield United prevailed 2–1 to give Liverpool its fifth league championship.

== Events ==
The season commenced on 31 August 1946. The largest crowd of the day was 61,000 at Stamford Bridge where Chelsea beat Bolton Wanderers 4–3. Aggregate attendance was 950,000 for the 43 matches – the match between Newport County and Southampton was postponed due to floods.

In September, Scottish International Inside-forward, Tommy Walker, joined Chelsea from Hearts for £6,000 (2010: £194,000). By 14 September most teams had averaged five games with only Manchester United and Doncaster Rovers maintaining a 100% record. By 23 September, only Barnsley, Manchester City, Rotherham United and Queens Park Rangers remained unbeaten.

On 5 October Newcastle United created a Second Division record, scoring 13 against Newport County. New signing Len Shackleton scored five.

In 1946 Sparta Prague toured Great Britain opening with a 2–2 draw against Arsenal on 2 October before losing 3–1 to Birmingham City.

== Honours ==
Competition	Winners	Runners-up
First Division	Liverpool (5)	Manchester United
Second Division	Manchester City	Burnley
Third Division North	Doncaster Rovers	Rotherham United
Third Division South	Cardiff City	Queens Park Rangers
FA Cup	Charlton Athletic (1)	Burnley
Home Championship	England	Ireland

Notes = Number in parentheses is the times that club has won that honour. * indicates new record for competition

== Football League ==
=== First Division ===
The first post-war season saw Liverpool win out in one of the most dramatic finishes to any title race; needing to beat Wolverhampton Wanderers in order to wrestle the title away from them, they walked away with a 2–1 win, and their first league title since 1923. However, the surprise package of the season were Manchester United, as Matt Busby's appointment as manager had an immediate impact and brought them a second-place finish, their highest since their last title win in 1911, with the intervening decades generally only having seen mid-table finishes combined with occasional spells in Division Two; it would prove to be just the start of two decades of immense success under the new manager's leadership. Wolves finished third, having led the table for much of the season, before being undone by a late loss of form. Despite finishing fourth, Stoke City had the opportunity to snatch the title away from Liverpool, due to their final game of the season being delayed by almost two weeks; a loss to Sheffield United ended their hopes, however.

At the bottom, Leeds United were relegated in bottom place, ultimately being cost dear by abysmal away form that saw them earn just one point away from Elland Road, and returning to the Second Division after 15 years. Brentford went down after five seasons in Division One; they would ultimately not return to the top-flight until 2021.

Pos	Team	Pld	W	D	L	GF	GA	GAv	Pts	Relegation
1	Liverpool (C)	42	25	7	10	84	52	1.615	57	
2	Manchester United	42	22	12	8	95	54	1.759	56	
3	Wolverhampton Wanderers	42	25	6	11	98	56	1.750	56	
4	Stoke City	42	24	7	11	90	53	1.698	55	
5	Blackpool	42	22	6	14	71	70	1.014	50	
6	Sheffield United	42	21	7	14	89	75	1.187	49	
7	Preston North End	42	18	11	13	76	74	1.027	47	
8	Aston Villa	42	18	9	15	67	53	1.264	45	
9	Sunderland	42	18	8	16	65	66	0.985	44	
10	Everton	42	17	9	16	62	67	0.925	43	
11	Middlesbrough	42	17	8	17	73	68	1.074	42	
12	Portsmouth	42	16	9	17	66	60	1.100	41	
13	Arsenal	42	16	9	17	72	70	1.029	41	
14	Derby County	42	18	5	19	73	79	0.924	41	
15	Chelsea	42	16	7	19	69	84	0.821	39	
16	Grimsby Town	42	13	12	17	61	82	0.744	38	
17	Blackburn Rovers	42	14	8	20	45	53	0.849	36	
18	Bolton Wanderers	42	13	8	21	57	69	0.826	34	
19	Charlton Athletic	42	11	12	19	57	71	0.803	34	
20	Huddersfield Town	42	13	7	22	53	79	0.671	33	
21	Brentford (R)	42	9	7	26	45	88	0.511	25	Relegation to the Second Division
22	Leeds United (R)	42	6	6	30	45	90	0.500	18	Relegation to the Second Division

Source: World Football
Rules for classification: 1) Points; 2) Goal average; 3) Goals scored
(C) Champions; (R) Relegated

=== Second Division ===
Manchester City won promotion back to the top-flight at the second attempt, closely followed by Burnley, who returned to Division One for the first time since 1930.

Newport County's first season in the second tier (not counting the abandoned 1939–40 season) ended in immediate relegation, with the club shipping a staggering 133 goals; it would ultimately prove this incarnation of the club's only season at this level before its dissolution in 1989. Fellow Welsh club Swansea Town were also relegated.

Pos	Team	Pld	W	D	L	GF	GA	GAv	Pts	Qualification or relegation
1	Manchester City (C, P)	42	26	10	6	78	35	2.229	62	Promotion to the First Division
2	Burnley (P)	42	22	14	6	65	29	2.241	58	Promotion to the First Division
3	Birmingham City	42	25	5	12	74	33	2.242	55	
4	Chesterfield	42	18	14	10	58	44	1.318	50	
5	Newcastle United	42	19	10	13	95	62	1.532	48	
6	Tottenham Hotspur	42	17	14	11	65	53	1.226	48	
7	West Bromwich Albion	42	20	8	14	88	75	1.173	48	
8	Coventry City	42	16	13	13	66	59	1.119	45	
9	Leicester City	42	18	7	17	69	64	1.078	43	
10	Barnsley	42	17	8	17	84	86	0.977	42	
11	Nottingham Forest	42	15	10	17	69	74	0.932	40	
12	West Ham United	42	16	8	18	70	76	0.921	40	
13	Luton Town	42	16	7	19	71	73	0.973	39	
14	Southampton	42	15	9	18	69	76	0.908	39	
15	Fulham	42	15	9	18	63	74	0.851	39	
16	Bradford (Park Avenue)	42	14	11	17	65	77	0.844	39	
17	Bury	42	12	12	18	80	78	1.026	36	
18	Millwall	42	14	8	20	56	79	0.709	36	
19	Plymouth Argyle	42	14	5	23	79	96	0.823	33	
20	Sheffield Wednesday	42	12	8	22	67	88	0.761	32	
21	Swansea Town (R)	42	11	7	24	55	83	0.663	29	Relegation to the Third Division South
22	Newport County (R)	42	10	3	29	61	133	0.459	23	Relegation to the Third Division South

Rules for classification: 1) Points; 2) Goal average; 3) Goals scored
(C) Champions; (P) Promoted; (R) Relegated

=== Third Division North ===
Doncaster Rovers were promoted to the Second Division, beating out South Yorkshire rivals Rotherham United, whose own record would have been enough for promotion in most years.

Southport and Halifax Town were both re-elected to the Football League.

Pos	Team	Pld	W	D	L	GF	GA	GAv	Pts	Promotion or relegation
1	Doncaster Rovers (C, P)	42	33	6	3	123	40	3.075	72	Promotion to the Second Division
2	Rotherham United	42	29	6	7	114	53	2.151	64	
3	Chester	42	25	6	11	95	51	1.863	56	
4	Stockport County	42	24	2	16	78	53	1.472	50	
5	Bradford City	42	20	10	12	62	47	1.319	50	
6	Rochdale	42	19	10	13	80	64	1.250	48	
7	Wrexham	42	17	12	13	65	51	1.275	46	
8	Crewe Alexandra	42	17	9	16	70	74	0.946	43	
9	Barrow	42	17	7	18	54	62	0.871	41	
10	Tranmere Rovers	42	17	7	18	66	77	0.857	41	
11	Hull City	42	16	8	18	49	53	0.925	40	
12	Lincoln City	42	17	5	20	86	87	0.989	39	
13	Hartlepools United	42	15	9	18	64	73	0.877	39	
14	Gateshead	42	16	6	20	62	72	0.861	38	
15	York City	42	14	9	19	67	81	0.827	37	
16	Carlisle United	42	14	9	19	70	93	0.753	37	
17	Darlington	42	15	6	21	68	80	0.850	36	
18	New Brighton	42	14	8	20	57	77	0.740	36	
19	Oldham Athletic	42	12	8	22	55	80	0.688	32	
20	Accrington Stanley	42	14	4	24	56	92	0.609	32	
21	Southport	42	7	11	24	53	85	0.624	25	Re-elected
22	Halifax Town	42	8	6	28	43	92	0.467	22	Re-elected

Source: rsssf.com
(C) Champions; (P) Promoted

=== Third Division South ===
Cardiff City won the division, meaning that they passed two of their Welsh rivals, Swansea and Newport, on their way up to the Second Division.

Norwich City and Mansfield Town were both re-elected, though Mansfield were transferred to the Third Division North for the following season.

Pos	Team	Pld	W	D	L	GF	GA	GAv	Pts	Promotion
1	Cardiff City (C, P)	42	30	6	6	93	30	3.100	66	Promotion to the Second Division
2	Queens Park Rangers	42	23	11	8	74	40	1.850	57	
3	Bristol City	42	20	11	11	94	56	1.679	51	
4	Swindon Town	42	19	11	12	84	73	1.151	49	
5	Walsall	42	17	12	13	74	59	1.254	46	
6	Ipswich Town	42	16	14	12	61	53	1.151	46	
7	Bournemouth & Boscombe Athletic	42	18	8	16	72	54	1.333	44	
8	Southend United	42	17	10	15	71	60	1.183	44	
9	Reading	42	16	11	15	83	74	1.122	43	
10	Port Vale	42	17	9	16	68	63	1.079	43	
11	Torquay United	42	15	12	15	52	61	0.852	42	
12	Notts County	42	15	10	17	63	63	1.000	40	
13	Northampton Town	42	15	10	17	72	75	0.960	40	
14	Bristol Rovers	42	16	8	18	59	69	0.855	40	
15	Exeter City	42	15	9	18	60	69	0.870	39	
16	Watford	42	17	5	20	61	76	0.803	39	
17	Brighton & Hove Albion	42	13	12	17	54	72	0.750	38	
18	Crystal Palace	42	13	11	18	49	62	0.790	37	
19	Leyton Orient	42	12	8	22	54	75	0.720	32	
20	Aldershot	42	10	12	20	48	78	0.615	32	
21	Norwich City	42	10	8	24	64	100	0.640	28	Re-elected
22	Mansfield Town	42	9	10	23	48	96	0.500	28	Re-elected, then transferred to the Third Division North

(C) Champions; (P) Promoted

=== Top goalscorers ===
First Division

- Dennis Westcott (Wolverhampton) – 38 goals

Second Division

- Charlie Wayman (Newcastle) – 30 goals

Third Division North

- Clarrie Jordan (Doncaster Rovers) – 42 goals

Third Division South

- Don Clark (Bristol City) – 36 goals
