= Clarence Lane =

Clarence Lane may refer to:

- Clarence D. Lane (1921–1998), American politician
- Clarrie Lane (born 1934), Australian rules footballer
