= Answerth =

Answerth is a surname. Notable people with the surname include:

- Clarrie Answerth (1901–1981), Australian rules footballer
- Noah Answerth (born 1999), Australian rules footballer
