= NISP =

NISP may refer to:

- National Industrial Security Program (USA)
- Neighborhood Internet service provider
- Number of Identified Specimens, used when counting remnants in archeology
- Catalyst (science park) (UK), formerly Northern Ireland Science Park
- NATO Interoperability Standards and Profiles
- National Solar Observatory's Integrated Synoptic Program (USA)
- Bank OCBC NISP, a bank in Indonesia
- Near-Infrared Spectrometer and Photometer (NISP), one of two cameras on the Euclid space telescope
