= Joe Sharp (rugby league) =

Australian rugby league footballer

Personal information
- Full name: Evley Joseph Sharp
- Born: 16 April 1906 Murrurundi, New South Wales, Australia
- Died: 31 July 2006 (aged 100) East Gosford, New South Wales, Australia

Playing information
- Position: Second-row
Club
Years	Team	Pld	T	G	FG	P
1929–32	St. George	23	1	0	0	3
1935	Canterbury-Bankstown	2	1	0	0	3
	Total	25	2	0	0	6

Evley Joseph Sharp (16 April 1906 – 31 July 2006) was an Australian rugby league footballer who played in the 1920s and 1930s.

Sharp played 32 first-grade games (including trial matches) for St. George during four seasons from 1929 to 1932. Former Club secretary and NSWRFL Vice President Clarrie Fahy recruited him after spotting the rangy forward running around for a railways side at Katoomba in the Blue Mountains in 1928.

"They were all good moments," Mr Sharp recalled of his years with the Saints. "St George was a great club. 'Snowy' Justice was the captain at the time. He was the hooker – I liked him and I got on well with him.".

After 4 seasons at Saints, Joe Sharp joined Canterbury-Bankstown in 1935 due to residential rules of the time.

Sharp died on 31 July 2006 aged 100 at East Gosford, New South Wales.
