= Ray Jordon =

Australian cricketer (1937–2012)

Personal information
- Full name: Raymond Clarence Jordon
- Born: 17 February 1937; Melbourne, Victoria, Australia
- Died: 13 August 2012 (aged 75); Melbourne, Australia
- Batting: Right-handed
- Role: Wicket-keeper

Domestic team information
- Years: Team
- 1959/60–1970/71: Victoria

Career statistics
Competition	First-class	List A
Matches	90	1
Runs scored	2414	27
Batting average	25.95	–
100s/50s	1/9	0/0
Top score	134	27*
Catches/stumpings	238/45	2/0
- Source: Cricinfo, 22 April 2023

Raymond Clarence "Slug" Jordon (17 February 1937 – 13 August 2012) was an Australian first-class cricketer who represented Victoria in the Sheffield Shield and toured with the Australian national cricket team. He was also a successful Australian rules football coach and acted as both reserves and under-19s coach at various clubs in the Victorian Football League (VFL).

Universally known as "Slug", his nickname arose as a result of an incident during his National Service at Puckapunyal.

== Family ==
His father, Clarence Charles Lewis "Clarrie" Jordon (1909-1965) played VFL football with Richmond, and VFA football with Prahran.

== Career ==
Jordon took a total of 230 dismissals in the Sheffield Shield and 283 for all first-class matches. His tally at both Shield and first-class level remained a Victorian record until surpassed by his replacement Richie Robinson, who himself was later bettered by Darren Berry. In 1970/71 he managed a career best ten dismissals in a match against South Australia at the Melbourne Cricket Ground.

His only first-class hundred was an innings of 134, also against South Australia, in the 1963/64 Sheffield Shield. The South Australian bowling attack was led by Gary Sobers and while he ran through Victoria's batting lineup with six second innings wickets, Jordon resisted with a century before falling LBW to Neil Hawke.

The wicket-keeper captained Victoria in five Sheffield Shield matches during his career, three of them in the 1968/69 season.

Jordon came close to playing Test cricket, touring both India and South Africa in 1969/70 as a standby for Brian Taber. Although he appeared in four of Australia's first-class warm up matches in India and six in South Africa, Jordon was not required for any of the Tests.

According to Ashley Mallett's biography of Ian Chappell, Chappelli Speaks Out, Bill Lawry was considering selecting Jordon to play in the fourth test instead of Taber because of the former's superior batting. Chappell said he would not play in the side if Jordon was picked because the wicketkeeper was a cheat. This was based on an incident during a game on the recent Indian tour when Australia was playing South Zone. E. A. S. Prasanna was facing Alan Connolly with Jordon standing up to the stumps – he appeared to miss the ball and his off stump was knocked forward. Jordon appealed and Prasanna eventually walked but Chappell believed the ball had missed Prasanna's stumps and rebounded off Jordon's pads to break the wicket – and that Jordon knew this.

Jordon played his district cricket for Richmond (one season), Carlton (ten seasons) and Fitzroy (five seasons). He also was captain/coach of the Dandenong Cricket Club in the VSDCA in the early 1970s.

== Football ==
During his early sporting years, Jordon was also an Australian rules football player, and he appeared in 96 matches for the Coburg Football Club in the Victorian Football Association, also serving as captain at the club for a time. He was a highly regarded player, and several Victorian Football League clubs were interested in recruiting him, but he retired from playing in 1962 to concentrate on cricket.

He was later a higher successful minor grade coach. Jordon led clubs at under-19 and reserve level, spending time at North Melbourne, Melbourne, Essendon, Richmond, as well as TAC Cup club Central/Prahran Dragons. Known for his colourful language and direct approach, Jordon had particular success with Melbourne's and Richmond's under-19s. He was credited with thirteen premierships from sixteen grand final appearances during his minor grade coaching career. While he was in charge of the reserves at North Melbourne he was called up to coach the seniors for a Victorian Football League game in 1976 because Ron Barassi was unavailable.

A parody of Jordon, named Jay "Grub" Gordon, appears in the Specky Magee series of novels written by former Melbourne player Garry Lyon and author Felice Arena.
