= 1946–47 Football League =

48th season of the Football League

The Football League
- Season: 1946–47
- Champions: Liverpool

The 1946–47 season was the 48th completed season of The Football League, and the first after the Second World War.

This season was the first to feature a full football programme since the 1938–39 campaign. Division placings were the same as in the unfinished 1939–40 Football League.

== Final division tables ==
Beginning with the season 1894–95, clubs finishing level on points were separated according to goal average (goals scored divided by goals conceded), or more properly put, goal ratio. In case one or more teams had the same goal difference, this system favoured those teams who had scored fewer goals. The goal average system was eventually scrapped beginning with the 1976–77 season.

From the 1922–23 season, the bottom two teams of both Third Division North and Third Division South were required to apply for re-election.

== First Division ==
First Division
- Season: 1946–47
- Champions: Liverpool; 5th English title
- Relegated: Brentford; Leeds United
- Matches: 462
- Goals: 1,513 (3.27 per match)
- Top goalscorer: Dennis Westcott (37 goals)

After a tight title race involving several clubs in the First Division, Liverpool won their fifth league title, finishing one point ahead of their nearest rivals Manchester United (who won two league titles before the World War I) and Wolverhampton Wanderers (who had yet to win a First Division title). Stoke City and Blackpool completed the top five.

Leeds United were relegated in bottom place after just six wins all season. They were joined by a Brentford side who failed to match their promising pre-war form, and would not return to the top flight until 2021.

Pos	Team	Pld	W	D	L	GF	GA	GAv	Pts	Relegation
1	Liverpool (C)	42	25	7	10	84	52	1.615	57	
2	Manchester United	42	22	12	8	95	54	1.759	56	
3	Wolverhampton Wanderers	42	25	6	11	98	56	1.750	56	
4	Stoke City	42	24	7	11	90	53	1.698	55	
5	Blackpool	42	22	6	14	71	70	1.014	50	
6	Sheffield United	42	21	7	14	89	75	1.187	49	
7	Preston North End	42	18	11	13	76	74	1.027	47	
8	Aston Villa	42	18	9	15	67	53	1.264	45	
9	Sunderland	42	18	8	16	65	66	0.985	44	
10	Everton	42	17	9	16	62	67	0.925	43	
11	Middlesbrough	42	17	8	17	73	68	1.074	42	
12	Portsmouth	42	16	9	17	66	60	1.100	41	
13	Arsenal	42	16	9	17	72	70	1.029	41	
14	Derby County	42	18	5	19	73	79	0.924	41	
15	Chelsea	42	16	7	19	69	84	0.821	39	
16	Grimsby Town	42	13	12	17	61	82	0.744	38	
17	Blackburn Rovers	42	14	8	20	45	53	0.849	36	
18	Bolton Wanderers	42	13	8	21	57	69	0.826	34	
19	Charlton Athletic	42	11	12	19	57	71	0.803	34	
20	Huddersfield Town	42	13	7	22	53	79	0.671	33	
21	Brentford (R)	42	9	7	26	45	88	0.511	25	Relegation to the Second Division
22	Leeds United (R)	42	6	6	30	45	90	0.500	18	Relegation to the Second Division

Source: World Football
Rules for classification: 1) Points; 2) Goal average; 3) Goals scored
(C) Champions; (R) Relegated

=== Results ===
Home \ Away	ARS	AST	BLB	BLP	BOL	BRE	CHA	CHE	DER	EVE	GRI	HUD	LEE	LIV	MUN	MID	POR	PNE	SHU	STK	SUN	WOL
Arsenal		0–2	1–3	1–1	2–2	2–2	1–0	1–2	0–1	2–1	5–3	1–2	4–2	1–2	6–2	4–0	2–1	4–1	2–3	1–0	2–2	1–1
Aston Villa	0–2		2–1	1–1	1–1	5–2	4–0	2–0	2–0	0–1	3–3	2–2	2–1	1–2	0–0	0–1	1–1	4–2	2–3	0–1	4–0	3–0
Blackburn Rovers	1–2	0–1		1–1	2–1	0–3	1–0	1–2	1–1	4–1	1–1	2–2	1–0	0–0	2–1	1–2	0–1	1–2	2–0	0–2	1–2	1–2
Blackpool	2–1	1–0	1–0		0–1	4–2	0–0	1–0	2–1	0–3	2–3	2–1	3–0	3–2	3–1	0–5	4–3	4–0	4–2	0–2	0–5	2–0
Bolton Wanderers	1–3	2–1	0–0	1–1		1–0	0–1	1–1	5–1	0–2	1–2	4–0	2–0	1–3	2–2	1–1	1–0	1–2	3–2	3–2	0–1	0–3
Brentford	0–1	0–2	0–3	2–1	1–0		1–4	0–2	0–3	1–1	0–1	2–0	1–1	1–1	0–0	0–0	1–3	2–3	2–1	1–4	0–3	4–1
Charlton Athletic	2–2	1–1	0–2	0–1	2–0	3–0		2–3	2–4	4–1	0–0	0–3	5–0	1–3	1–3	3–3	0–0	0–0	1–2	1–0	5–0	1–4
Chelsea	2–1	1–3	0–2	1–4	4–3	3–2	2–2		3–0	1–1	0–0	1–0	3–0	3–1	0–3	2–0	0–3	1–2	1–4	2–5	2–1	1–2
Derby County	0–1	1–2	2–1	1–2	1–3	2–1	1–0	3–1		5–1	4–1	1–0	2–1	1–4	4–3	1–1	2–0	2–2	1–2	3–0	5–1	2–1
Everton	3–2	2–0	1–0	1–1	2–1	0–2	1–1	2–0	4–1		3–3	1–0	4–1	1–0	2–2	2–1	1–0	2–0	2–3	2–2	4–2	0–2
Grimsby Town	0–0	0–3	2–1	2–3	2–2	2–2	3–1	2–1	2–0	2–2		1–0	4–1	1–6	0–0	4–0	3–2	2–3	2–1	2–5	1–2	0–0
Huddersfield Town	0–0	1–0	0–1	1–3	1–0	3–0	5–1	1–4	5–2	1–0	3–2		1–0	1–4	2–2	3–1	1–2	3–0	1–1	1–0	0–0	0–1
Leeds United	1–1	1–1	0–1	4–2	4–0	1–2	0–2	2–1	1–2	2–1	1–0	5–0		1–2	0–2	3–3	0–1	0–3	2–2	1–2	1–1	0–1
Liverpool	4–2	4–1	2–1	2–3	0–3	1–0	1–1	7–4	1–1	0–0	5–0	1–0	2–0		1–0	0–1	3–0	3–0	1–2	2–0	1–0	1–5
Manchester United	5–2	2–1	4–0	3–0	1–0	4–1	4–1	1–1	4–1	3–0	2–1	5–2	3–1	5–0		1–0	3–0	1–1	6–2	1–1	0–3	3–1
Middlesbrough	2–0	1–2	0–1	1–2	3–1	2–0	1–2	3–2	1–0	4–0	3–0	4–1	3–0	2–2	2–4		3–3	2–0	2–4	5–4	1–3	1–1
Portsmouth	0–2	3–2	3–1	0–1	2–0	3–0	3–0	0–2	1–2	2–1	4–1	3–1	4–1	1–2	0–1	3–1		4–4	0–0	1–3	4–1	1–1
Preston North End	2–0	3–1	4–0	2–0	0–4	5–2	5–1	1–1	1–1	2–1	3–0	6–2	3–2	0–0	1–1	0–1	1–1		1–2	1–3	2–2	2–2
Sheffield United	2–1	1–2	0–1	4–2	4–2	6–1	1–3	2–2	3–2	2–0	1–1	2–2	6–2	0–1	2–2	2–1	3–1	2–3		2–1	4–2	2–0
Stoke City	3–1	0–0	0–0	4–1	1–2	3–1	2–2	6–1	3–2	2–1	3–0	3–0	5–2	2–1	3–2	3–1	1–1	5–0	3–0		0–0	0–3
Sunderland	1–4	4–1	1–0	3–2	3–1	2–1	1–1	1–2	3–2	4–1	1–2	3–0	1–0	1–4	1–1	1–0	0–0	0–2	2–1	0–1		0–1
Wolverhampton Wanderers	6–1	1–2	3–3	3–1	5–0	1–2	2–0	6–4	7–2	2–3	2–0	6–1	1–0	1–2	3–2	2–4	3–1	4–1	3–1	3–0	2–1	

Updated to match(es) played on unknown. Source: Ian Laschke: Rothmans Book of Football League Records 1888–89 to 1978–79. Macdonald and Jane’s, London & Sydney, 1980.
Legend: Blue = home team win; Yellow = draw; Red = away team win.

=== Maps ===
Locations of the Football League First Division London teams 1946–1947
Locations of the Football League First Division 1946–1947 teams

== Second Division ==
Second Division
- Season: 1946–47
- Champions: Manchester City
- Promoted: Manchester City; Burnley
- Relegated: Swansea Town; Newport County
- Matches: 462
- Goals: 1,547 (3.35 per match)
- Top goalscorer: Charlie Wayman (30 goals)

Pos	Team	Pld	W	D	L	GF	GA	GAv	Pts	Qualification or relegation
1	Manchester City (C, P)	42	26	10	6	78	35	2.229	62	Promotion to the First Division
2	Burnley (P)	42	22	14	6	65	29	2.241	58	Promotion to the First Division
3	Birmingham City	42	25	5	12	74	33	2.242	55	
4	Chesterfield	42	18	14	10	58	44	1.318	50	
5	Newcastle United	42	19	10	13	95	62	1.532	48	
6	Tottenham Hotspur	42	17	14	11	65	53	1.226	48	
7	West Bromwich Albion	42	20	8	14	88	75	1.173	48	
8	Coventry City	42	16	13	13	66	59	1.119	45	
9	Leicester City	42	18	7	17	69	64	1.078	43	
10	Barnsley	42	17	8	17	84	86	0.977	42	
11	Nottingham Forest	42	15	10	17	69	74	0.932	40	
12	West Ham United	42	16	8	18	70	76	0.921	40	
13	Luton Town	42	16	7	19	71	73	0.973	39	
14	Southampton	42	15	9	18	69	76	0.908	39	
15	Fulham	42	15	9	18	63	74	0.851	39	
16	Bradford (Park Avenue)	42	14	11	17	65	77	0.844	39	
17	Bury	42	12	12	18	80	78	1.026	36	
18	Millwall	42	14	8	20	56	79	0.709	36	
19	Plymouth Argyle	42	14	5	23	79	96	0.823	33	
20	Sheffield Wednesday	42	12	8	22	67	88	0.761	32	
21	Swansea Town (R)	42	11	7	24	55	83	0.663	29	Relegation to the Third Division South
22	Newport County (R)	42	10	3	29	61	133	0.459	23	Relegation to the Third Division South

Rules for classification: 1) Points; 2) Goal average; 3) Goals scored
(C) Champions; (P) Promoted; (R) Relegated

=== Results ===
Home \ Away	BAR	BIR	BPA	BUR	BRY	CHF	COV	FUL	LEI	LUT	MCI	MIL	NEW	NPC	NOT	PLY	SHW	SOU	SWA	TOT	WBA	WHU
Barnsley		3–1	3–1	1–0	4–0	1–2	0–2	4–1	1–0	4–0	0–2	4–1	1–1	3–1	3–2	1–3	4–1	4–4	3–1	1–3	2–1	1–2
Birmingham	1–2		4–0	0–2	3–0	0–0	2–0	2–1	4–0	1–0	3–1	4–0	2–0	1–1	4–0	6–1	3–1	3–1	3–1	1–0	1–0	3–0
Bradford Park Avenue	1–3	2–0		0–1	2–2	0–0	5–1	1–2	1–2	2–1	1–1	0–0	2–1	2–1	0–1	3–2	1–1	2–3	0–0	2–1	2–4	0–1
Burnley	2–2	1–0	1–2		1–1	1–1	1–1	2–0	0–0	1–1	0–0	3–0	3–0	3–2	3–0	2–1	2–0	1–0	1–0	0–0	0–2	2–1
Bury	4–4	2–0	6–3	2–2		0–2	1–0	7–2	2–3	3–0	2–2	5–2	2–2	0–1	5–0	3–3	4–2	2–1	3–3	1–2	4–0	4–0
Chesterfield	2–1	0–1	1–1	0–0	3–1		2–1	1–1	2–0	2–1	0–1	2–3	1–0	2–0	1–1	4–1	4–2	5–0	1–0	0–0	1–1	3–1
Coventry City	1–1	0–0	0–0	0–3	3–1	1–1		1–0	2–1	0–0	1–1	4–0	1–1	6–0	1–1	1–0	5–1	2–0	3–2	3–1	3–2	2–1
Fulham	6–1	0–1	0–3	1–0	2–0	2–1	2–0		4–2	2–1	2–2	3–2	0–3	4–1	1–1	3–1	1–2	0–0	3–0	1–1	0–1	3–2
Leicester City	6–0	2–1	2–1	1–4	0–0	0–1	1–0	2–0		2–1	0–3	5–0	2–4	3–0	1–1	4–1	3–5	2–0	0–1	1–1	1–1	4–0
Luton Town	3–1	1–3	3–0	1–3	2–0	1–1	1–1	2–0	1–2		0–0	3–0	4–3	6–3	3–2	3–4	4–1	2–2	3–0	3–2	2–0	2–1
Manchester City	5–1	1–0	7–2	1–0	3–1	0–0	1–0	4–0	1–0	2–0		1–0	0–2	5–1	2–1	4–3	2–1	1–1	1–1	1–0	5–0	2–0
Millwall	3–1	0–2	0–1	1–1	1–0	1–1	3–5	1–1	1–0	2–0	1–3		1–4	3–1	4–0	1–1	2–2	3–1	1–1	0–3	1–2	0–0
Newcastle United	4–2	2–2	5–0	1–2	1–1	2–1	3–1	1–3	1–1	7–2	3–2	0–2		13–0	3–0	3–2	4–0	1–3	1–1	1–0	2–4	2–3
Newport County	2–1	0–3	1–3	0–3	2–0	3–0	4–2	4–2	2–3	1–3	0–3	3–1	4–2		2–5	1–0	4–3	1–2	2–4	2–4	2–7	1–1
Nottingham Forest	2–1	1–1	4–0	1–0	2–0	1–0	1–0	2–1	2–0	4–2	0–1	1–2	0–2	6–1		5–1	2–2	6–0	1–1	1–1	1–1	4–3
Plymouth Argyle	3–2	0–2	2–4	2–2	3–1	1–0	2–2	2–2	4–0	2–1	2–3	0–2	0–1	4–1	2–0		4–1	2–3	2–1	3–4	2–1	3–1
Sheffield Wednesday	2–4	1–0	1–2	1–2	2–5	0–1	4–2	1–1	1–3	1–1	1–0	3–0	1–1	2–1	2–0	2–1		3–0	3–0	5–1	2–2	1–1
Southampton	1–1	1–0	3–2	0–1	1–1	1–1	5–2	2–0	1–1	1–3	0–1	1–2	1–1	5–1	5–2	5–1	3–1		4–0	1–0	0–1	4–2
Swansea Town	2–2	1–0	1–6	0–2	1–0	1–2	2–3	0–2	3–4	2–0	1–2	0–3	1–2	5–1	3–2	3–1	2–0	4–2		0–2	2–3	2–1
Tottenham Hotspur	1–1	1–2	3–3	1–1	2–1	3–4	0–0	1–1	2–1	2–1	0–0	2–1	1–1	3–1	2–0	2–1	2–0	2–1	3–1		2–0	0–0
West Bromwich Albion	2–5	3–0	1–1	1–1	3–0	3–2	1–1	6–1	4–2	1–2	3–1	2–4	3–2	2–2	5–1	2–5	2–1	2–0	2–1	3–2		2–3
West Ham United	4–0	0–4	1–1	0–5	3–3	5–0	1–2	3–2	0–2	2–1	1–0	3–1	0–2	3–0	2–2	4–1	2–1	4–0	3–0	2–2	3–2	

Updated to match(es) played on unknown. Source: Ian Laschke: Rothmans Book of Football League Records 1888–89 to 1978–79. Macdonald and Jane’s, London & Sydney, 1980.
Legend: Blue = home team win; Yellow = draw; Red = away team win.

=== Maps ===
Locations of the Football League Second Division London teams 1946–1947
Locations of the Football League Second Division 1946–1947 teams

== Third Division North ==
Football League Third Division North
- Season: 1946–47
- Champions: Doncaster Rovers (2nd title)
- Failed re-election: None
- Matches: 462
- Goals: 1,537 (3.33 per match)
- Top goalscorer: Clarrie Jordan (Doncaster Rovers), 42

Pos	Team	Pld	W	D	L	GF	GA	GAv	Pts	Promotion or relegation
1	Doncaster Rovers (C, P)	42	33	6	3	123	40	3.075	72	Promotion to the Second Division
2	Rotherham United	42	29	6	7	114	53	2.151	64	
3	Chester	42	25	6	11	95	51	1.863	56	
4	Stockport County	42	24	2	16	78	53	1.472	50	
5	Bradford City	42	20	10	12	62	47	1.319	50	
6	Rochdale	42	19	10	13	80	64	1.250	48	
7	Wrexham	42	17	12	13	65	51	1.275	46	
8	Crewe Alexandra	42	17	9	16	70	74	0.946	43	
9	Barrow	42	17	7	18	54	62	0.871	41	
10	Tranmere Rovers	42	17	7	18	66	77	0.857	41	
11	Hull City	42	16	8	18	49	53	0.925	40	
12	Lincoln City	42	17	5	20	86	87	0.989	39	
13	Hartlepools United	42	15	9	18	64	73	0.877	39	
14	Gateshead	42	16	6	20	62	72	0.861	38	
15	York City	42	14	9	19	67	81	0.827	37	
16	Carlisle United	42	14	9	19	70	93	0.753	37	
17	Darlington	42	15	6	21	68	80	0.850	36	
18	New Brighton	42	14	8	20	57	77	0.740	36	
19	Oldham Athletic	42	12	8	22	55	80	0.688	32	
20	Accrington Stanley	42	14	4	24	56	92	0.609	32	
21	Southport	42	7	11	24	53	85	0.624	25	Re-elected
22	Halifax Town	42	8	6	28	43	92	0.467	22	Re-elected

Source: rsssf.com
(C) Champions; (P) Promoted

=== Results ===
Home \ Away	ACC	BRW	BRA	CRL	CHE	CRE	DAR	DON	GAT	HAL	HAR	HUL	LIN	NWB	OLD	ROC	ROT	SOU	STP	TRA	WRE	YOR
Accrington Stanley		1–3	0–0	4–3	1–4	2–3	3–0	0–1	0–3	1–1	2–1	0–0	8–4	3–1	2–3	2–3	2–3	1–0	2–1	2–1	0–1	1–2
Barrow	1–3		0–0	3–1	1–0	0–2	2–3	0–1	1–0	3–0	2–0	1–0	1–3	0–1	5–2	2–2	2–3	2–1	1–0	0–1	1–0	0–1
Bradford City	3–1	5–0		2–2	0–0	1–0	2–0	0–1	2–2	3–1	1–2	1–1	3–0	2–1	1–0	0–1	2–0	5–1	0–2	2–2	2–1	3–2
Carlisle United	4–2	4–1	4–3		3–2	3–3	1–5	2–3	3–1	1–0	5–1	0–2	1–0	3–2	1–2	1–3	1–1	1–1	1–1	4–2	1–1	1–2
Chester	3–1	3–0	3–0	4–0		2–0	1–1	1–3	0–1	2–0	2–1	5–1	3–0	2–1	2–0	1–0	2–2	2–1	3–0	4–1	2–0	6–0
Crewe Alexandra	5–0	0–1	2–2	2–0	0–2		3–2	0–3	1–1	2–0	1–1	2–0	0–5	3–0	3–0	2–2	1–2	2–0	3–2	4–3	1–0	2–0
Darlington	5–0	0–1	2–0	2–1	3–3	4–0		1–1	2–0	0–1	2–1	0–2	4–3	4–0	1–1	4–1	4–3	4–2	1–2	1–2	1–1	3–1
Doncaster Rovers	5–0	8–0	4–3	9–2	3–0	1–1	5–0		3–0	2–0	5–1	4–1	1–1	0–0	4–2	2–1	1–1	2–0	1–3	2–0	5–0	0–0
Gateshead	2–1	0–5	1–2	1–3	3–4	2–1	1–0	1–3		6–1	0–1	1–0	3–0	3–0	1–0	2–2	2–0	2–2	1–2	3–1	3–3	1–2
Halifax Town	2–1	3–2	1–2	0–1	1–2	1–2	0–2	4–2	2–1		1–4	2–0	2–3	0–1	1–1	3–0	2–3	1–1	1–2	1–3	0–0	0–3
Hartlepool	0–2	1–1	0–0	4–1	5–1	5–2	4–1	0–2	1–3	1–4		0–0	2–0	3–0	1–1	0–3	2–1	3–0	1–0	1–0	1–3	1–1
Hull City	3–0	1–0	0–2	2–0	1–0	2–2	2–1	0–1	1–2	3–0	1–1		0–0	1–1	0–1	0–1	0–2	4–0	0–3	1–0	1–0	2–2
Lincoln City	1–1	1–0	0–1	3–1	2–2	1–3	2–0	3–5	4–0	3–1	5–2	0–3		5–1	1–3	2–3	4–0	4–2	4–0	2–1	3–1	2–2
New Brighton	4–0	0–1	0–0	2–2	0–3	4–0	4–1	2–5	2–3	1–1	2–1	1–5	4–2		4–0	1–2	1–0	1–0	1–0	2–1	1–0	0–3
Oldham Athletic	1–2	0–1	0–1	0–2	1–0	3–1	2–0	0–1	1–1	6–1	0–0	1–2	3–1	2–2		3–2	0–1	2–4	0–0	1–2	1–5	2–2
Rochdale	5–1	1–1	0–1	6–0	2–1	1–1	3–0	2–3	2–3	1–0	1–0	5–2	2–0	2–2	1–3		1–1	0–0	1–4	3–0	0–1	0–1
Rotherham United	4–1	4–3	2–1	4–0	3–1	5–1	4–1	3–2	4–0	6–1	4–0	2–0	3–0	3–0	8–0	3–3		2–1	2–1	6–0	3–2	6–1
Southport	0–1	2–2	0–1	0–2	2–4	2–2	2–2	0–5	2–1	6–1	3–3	3–1	1–3	2–0	2–4	0–2	2–0		4–1	1–2	1–1	0–3
Stockport County	2–0	2–0	4–0	2–0	0–3	3–2	1–0	1–3	2–0	4–1	1–2	2–0	3–2	2–0	4–0	5–2	1–2	2–0		4–0	1–0	4–2
Tranmere	0–1	1–1	2–0	1–1	3–2	3–2	2–0	3–5	1–0	1–1	4–1	1–3	5–2	3–3	4–2	2–3	1–4	2–0	2–1		0–0	2–1
Wrexham	4–0	1–1	2–0	2–1	0–4	1–0	7–1	0–2	2–0	2–0	4–1	0–1	4–1	3–2	2–1	2–2	1–1	1–1	2–1	0–0		3–1
York City	0–1	0–2	0–3	2–2	4–4	2–3	3–0	1–4	3–1	2–0	1–4	3–0	2–4	1–2	1–0	2–3	2–3	1–1	3–2	0–1	2–2	

Updated to match(es) played on unknown. Source: Ian Laschke: Rothmans Book of Football League Records 1888–89 to 1978–79. Macdonald and Jane’s, London & Sydney, 1980.
Legend: Blue = home team win; Yellow = draw; Red = away team win.

=== Maps ===
Locations of the Football League Third Division North teams 1946–1947

== Third Division South ==
Football League Third Division South
- Season: 1946–47
- Champions: Cardiff City (1st title)
- Failed re-election: None
- Matches: 462
- Goals: 1,458 (3.16 per match)
- Top goalscorer: Don Clark (Bristol City), 36

Pos	Team	Pld	W	D	L	GF	GA	GAv	Pts	Promotion
1	Cardiff City (C, P)	42	30	6	6	93	30	3.100	66	Promotion to the Second Division
2	Queens Park Rangers	42	23	11	8	74	40	1.850	57	
3	Bristol City	42	20	11	11	94	56	1.679	51	
4	Swindon Town	42	19	11	12	84	73	1.151	49	
5	Walsall	42	17	12	13	74	59	1.254	46	
6	Ipswich Town	42	16	14	12	61	53	1.151	46	
7	Bournemouth & Boscombe Athletic	42	18	8	16	72	54	1.333	44	
8	Southend United	42	17	10	15	71	60	1.183	44	
9	Reading	42	16	11	15	83	74	1.122	43	
10	Port Vale	42	17	9	16	68	63	1.079	43	
11	Torquay United	42	15	12	15	52	61	0.852	42	
12	Notts County	42	15	10	17	63	63	1.000	40	
13	Northampton Town	42	15	10	17	72	75	0.960	40	
14	Bristol Rovers	42	16	8	18	59	69	0.855	40	
15	Exeter City	42	15	9	18	60	69	0.870	39	
16	Watford	42	17	5	20	61	76	0.803	39	
17	Brighton & Hove Albion	42	13	12	17	54	72	0.750	38	
18	Crystal Palace	42	13	11	18	49	62	0.790	37	
19	Leyton Orient	42	12	8	22	54	75	0.720	32	
20	Aldershot	42	10	12	20	48	78	0.615	32	
21	Norwich City	42	10	8	24	64	100	0.640	28	Re-elected
22	Mansfield Town	42	9	10	23	48	96	0.500	28	Re-elected, then transferred to the Third Division North

(C) Champions; (P) Promoted

=== Results ===
Home \ Away	ALD	B&BA	B&HA	BRI	BRR	CAR	CRY	EXE	IPS	LEY	MAN	NOR	NWC	NTC	PTV	QPR	REA	STD	SWI	TOR	WAL	WAT
Aldershot		2–1	1–3	4–3	0–2	0–1	0–2	2–0	4–1	0–0	1–1	1–1	3–1	1–1	0–0	1–2	1–3	0–0	2–0	0–0	1–2	1–2
Bournemouth & Boscombe Athletic	2–2		1–0	0–0	1–3	2–0	4–0	4–1	1–1	2–0	3–1	2–1	0–1	1–2	3–0	1–1	1–0	3–1	5–2	5–0	2–3	0–1
Brighton & Hove Albion	2–1	1–1		1–1	1–2	0–4	1–0	1–6	0–0	2–1	5–0	2–2	3–3	3–2	0–0	0–2	1–4	2–1	1–4	2–0	2–0	1–1
Bristol City	9–0	1–0	0–0		4–0	2–1	3–0	2–2	1–2	3–0	5–2	2–3	2–1	1–1	3–0	1–1	5–2	2–0	3–1	5–0	1–2	1–2
Bristol Rovers	0–0	0–2	0–0	0–3		1–0	2–1	1–0	1–1	6–1	1–0	0–3	1–2	4–1	0–0	3–1	2–2	1–3	3–0	3–0	2–2	3–4
Cardiff City	2–1	2–0	4–0	1–1	4–0		0–0	5–0	3–2	1–0	5–0	6–2	6–1	2–1	1–0	2–2	3–0	3–1	5–0	1–0	3–0	1–0
Crystal Palace	0–0	0–1	1–0	0–0	2–1	1–2		1–0	1–1	2–0	1–1	2–2	0–1	2–1	1–2	0–0	2–1	0–3	4–1	6–1	1–1	2–0
Exeter City	4–1	4–1	2–1	1–3	3–2	0–2	2–1		0–0	3–1	1–0	1–0	3–0	2–2	1–1	3–0	1–3	1–5	1–1	1–1	2–2	1–0
Ipswich Town	1–1	2–1	1–2	3–2	0–2	0–1	1–1	2–1		0–0	2–1	1–2	5–0	1–2	2–1	1–1	2–0	1–0	3–1	1–1	2–1	2–0
Leyton Orient	1–3	2–3	2–1	4–1	3–0	0–1	0–1	3–1	2–2		3–1	2–1	3–0	1–3	5–3	1–1	3–3	1–1	0–0	0–1	1–0	3–1
Mansfield Town	1–3	1–1	0–3	1–3	3–1	1–3	3–1	1–0	4–3	1–3		3–2	4–4	1–0	0–3	0–3	2–2	0–1	1–1	1–0	1–1	2–0
Northampton Town	2–2	2–1	6–1	2–2	1–2	0–2	1–0	1–2	2–2	4–1	3–0		1–0	2–1	1–0	4–4	4–0	2–3	4–1	0–0	0–8	4–1
Norwich City	2–3	1–6	2–3	2–2	3–3	2–1	2–3	1–3	0–1	5–0	3–1	2–3		2–2	3–0	0–1	0–2	1–5	1–5	2–0	0–2	4–2
Notts County	2–0	1–0	2–0	0–3	6–0	1–1	0–0	0–0	1–2	1–2	5–1	1–0	3–0		3–2	1–2	1–0	0–2	0–0	0–2	3–1	4–1
Port Vale	4–2	1–0	4–1	2–1	2–1	0–4	4–2	1–2	1–0	2–1	4–1	1–1	1–3	4–1		2–2	5–1	5–1	1–1	2–1	2–2	3–0
Queens Park Rangers	4–1	3–0	2–0	1–0	0–2	2–3	1–2	2–0	1–3	2–0	3–1	1–0	1–1	4–1	2–0		2–0	1–0	7–0	0–0	1–0	2–1
Reading	1–0	3–2	2–0	2–5	1–1	0–0	10–2	4–0	1–3	2–0	3–0	3–0	4–3	1–1	0–2	1–0		7–2	3–3	2–2	1–1	2–3
Southend	2–1	2–2	0–0	4–1	2–3	0–2	2–0	2–2	1–1	0–0	1–1	4–0	3–0	3–0	1–1	1–3	0–2		2–0	0–2	3–1	5–0
Swindon Town	7–0	1–3	2–2	1–1	1–0	3–2	1–0	2–0	2–1	2–0	6–1	3–1	1–1	4–2	2–1	3–2	2–2	2–1		2–4	4–1	5–0
Torquay United	0–1	2–2	3–1	2–3	3–0	0–0	2–1	2–1	0–0	3–2	2–2	2–1	2–1	1–2	1–0	0–0	3–0	0–1	1–5		2–0	2–0
Walsall	2–0	3–0	1–1	3–0	2–0	2–3	3–3	2–1	4–2	3–1	0–0	2–0	2–2	2–0	4–1	0–2	2–2	2–2	0–1	2–1		1–3
Watford	4–1	0–2	1–4	2–3	1–0	2–0	1–0	3–1	2–0	3–1	1–2	1–1	4–1	2–2	2–0	0–2	2–1	4–0	1–1	3–3	0–2	

Updated to match(es) played on unknown. Source: Ian Laschke: Rothmans Book of Football League Records 1888–89 to 1978–79. Macdonald and Jane’s, London & Sydney, 1980.
Legend: Blue = home team win; Yellow = draw; Red = away team win.

=== Maps ===
Locations of the Football League Third Division South London teams 1946–1947
Locations of the Football League Third Division South teams 1946–1947

== Attendances ==
=== Division One ===
No.	Club	Average
1	Liverpool FC	45,732
2	Chelsea FC	44,550
3	Manchester United	43,945
4	Arsenal FC	43,266
5	Wolverhampton Wanderers FC	43,254
6	Everton FC	40,854
7	Aston Villa FC	38,944
8	Middlesbrough FC	35,912
9	Sunderland AFC	35,301
10	Charlton Athletic FC	32,401
11	Stoke City FC	30,863
12	Portsmouth FC	30,198
13	Sheffield United FC	29,537
14	Bolton Wanderers FC	28,692
15	Preston North End FC	26,649
16	Blackburn Rovers FC	26,367
17	Leeds United FC	26,049
18	Brentford FC	25,768
19	Derby County FC	23,708
20	Blackpool FC	21,552
21	Huddersfield Town AFC	19,813
22	Grimsby Town FC	16,220

=== Division Two ===
No.	Club	Average
1	Newcastle United FC	49,379
2	Manchester City FC	39,283
3	Tottenham Hotspur FC	34,636
4	Birmingham City FC	32,643
5	Sheffield Wednesday FC	26,851
6	West Bromwich Albion FC	26,423
7	Burnley FC	25,856
8	Leicester City FC	23,783
9	Fulham FC	23,695
10	Plymouth Argyle FC	23,375
11	West Ham United FC	23,278
12	Nottingham Forest FC	22,764
13	Millwall FC	21,841
14	Swansea City AFC	21,039
15	Coventry City FC	19,975
16	Barnsley FC	19,206
17	Luton Town FC	17,238
18	Southampton FC	16,597
19	Bradford Park Avenue AFC	14,876
20	Bury FC	14,764
21	Chesterfield FC	14,703
22	Newport County AFC	12,505

=== Division Three ===
No.	Club	Average
1	Cardiff City FC	28,604
2	Hull City AFC	19,673
3	Bristol City FC	18,849
4	Norwich City FC	17,138
5	Queens Park Rangers FC	16,519
6	Swindon Town FC	16,012
7	Notts County FC	15,376
8	Doncaster Rovers FC	15,339
9	Crystal Palace FC	14,082
10	Rotherham United FC	13,155
11	Ipswich Town FC	13,114
12	Bristol Rovers FC	12,527
13	Reading FC	12,032
14	Walsall FC	11,173
15	Oldham Athletic FC	10,877
16	Port Vale FC	10,582
17	AFC Bournemouth	10,440
18	Carlisle United FC	10,263
19	Leyton Orient FC	10,048
20	Bradford City AFC	9,912
21	Southend United FC	9,690
22	Exeter City FC	8,888
23	Stockport County FC	8,881
24	Wrexham AFC	8,807
25	Watford FC	8,343
26	Brighton & Hove Albion FC	8,227
27	Tranmere Rovers	8,076
28	Northampton Town FC	7,951
29	Lincoln City FC	7,614
30	Rochdale AFC	7,577
31	Hartlepool United FC	7,562
32	Mansfield Town FC	7,029
33	York City FC	6,685
34	Darlington FC	6,671
35	Barrow AFC	6,542
36	Chester City FC	6,466
37	Torquay United FC	6,286
38	New Brighton AFC	5,927
39	Crewe Alexandra FC	5,785
40	Southport FC	4,708
41	Aldershot Town FC	4,677
42	Halifax Town AFC	4,480
43	Gateshead AFC	4,412
44	Accrington Stanley FC	3,976

== See also ==
- 1946-47 in English football
- 1946 in association football
- 1947 in association football
