= Clary Ranch =

Archeological site in Nebraska, United States

Coordinates: 41.259°N 102.126°W

Clary Ranch in Nebraska, United States, formerly a private cattle ranch, is a site of multiple archaeological digs, many of which produced significant artifacts and remains.

== History ==
Clary Ranch was first reported to the University of Nebraska State Museum (UNSM) in 1970. Rancher Oren V. Clary had noticed artifacts, charcoal, and bison remains eroding from the base of a cut bank in Ash Hollow Draw. In 1979, archaeologist Thomas Myers began the first of four consecutive month-long summer field seasons from 1979 to 1983. Myers was assisted by vertebrate paleontologists R. George Corner and Lloyd G. Tanner. Though much was found, the site was never fully reported on until Matthew G Hill started a comprehensive analysis of the bison remains in 1997. Hill's report was completed several years later and used in his doctoral dissertation from the University of Wisconsin–Madison. From Hill's assessment new questions of the site arose, so a series of field seasons were held between 2001 and 2004.

=== 1979–1982 excavations ===
The first excavations of Clary Ranch were led by Myers, Corner, and Tanner, and the crews consisted of volunteer members of the Nebraska Archaeological Society. The excavations averaged 50 1x1 meter units excavated each summer. In the end of the 1982 season, a total of approximately 194 m^{2} had been excavated over two different areas: Area A had 182 m^{2} excavated, while Area B, which was located 8 m west of the main block, had 12 m^{2} excavated. It was standard protocol for the excavators to only identify map larger faunal remains, articulated remains, and formal artifacts. Though smaller elements were not mapped, they were collected by unit and level. This meant that minimally each recovered item has a 1 by 1 m excavation unit provenience.

From these field seasons, the UNSM collected a bison assemblage of 1966 (NISP) specimen. From these elements, the minimum number of individuals at the site is 41. Though many specimen have been identified, most of the bones are fragmentary with only 15 long bones that were unbroken. This information, coupled with the 247 unidentified long bone shaft fragments, highly suggests that the assemblage was processed for marrow. Based on volumetric data from modern bison, it is estimated that 4.5 gallons of marrow were acquired. This is because almost all long bones (90%) were processed for marrow, no matter how much nutrition they provide.

=== 2001–2004 excavations ===
Upon completion of his 1997 faunal analysis, Matt Hill was left with several questions that were currently unanswerable given the data sets. In order to attempt to answer remaining questions, two field sessions totaling 15 days were held using "reconnaissance-type investigations" to re-expose past excavations, identify areas of intact sediment, and assess the potential for renewed excavations. The site returned positive results for excavations, so in 2003 an Iowa State University field school was held. The main goal of this field school was to review the recovery methods employed by the UNSM, specifically, if the excavations methods shaped the lithic collections, which was void of microdebitage. The 2003 excavations were located in between 10 previous units, all of which had produced bison remains, but no lithic material. The area was separated into 1x1 m^{2} units, which were then separated into 16 25x25 cm^{2} sections and excavated at arbitrary levels of 2 cm^{2}. One of the most important results of the 2003 excavations was the extraction of collagen from a bison femur shaft fragment that provided the first radiocarbon date for the site, which was 9040 $\pm$35 years before present.

Secondly, no chipped stone artifacts were recovered in situ. Thirty-three pieces of microdebitage were recovered using water screening techniques, the largest of which measured 7 millimeters. From this information it was figured that the UNSM excavations were unbiased towards small artifacts. Second, this contrasted UNSM data of areas featuring heavy artifact and debitage clusters, which helps argue for specified use of areas in the site. Using this information, Hill sought to answer even more questions, and in 2004 he returned for another field school with funding from the National Science Foundation.
