= Clarrie Woodfield =

Australian rules footballer

Personal information
- Full name: Clarence Hector Woodfield
- Born: 9 April 1901
- Died: 14 April 1968 (aged 67)
- Original team: Bendigo
- Height: 178 cm (5 ft 10 in)
- Weight: 81 kg (179 lb)

Playing career^{1}
Years	Club	Games (Goals)
1921	Essendon	1 (0)
1922	South Melbourne	1 (0)
Total		2 (0)
- ^{1} Playing statistics correct to the end of 1922.

Clarence Hector Woodfield (9 April 1901 – 14 April 1968) was an Australian rules footballer who played with Essendon and South Melbourne in the Victorian Football League (VFL).
