= Clarrie Swenson =

Australian rules footballer

Personal information
- Full name: Clarence Adair Swenson
- Born: 23 May 1923; Heywood, Victoria
- Died: 28 January 2003 (aged 79); Morwell
- Original team: Collingwood Juniors
- Height: 175 cm (5 ft 9 in)
- Weight: 71 kg (157 lb)

Playing career^{1}
Years	Club	Games (Goals)
1941, 1946	Collingwood	4 (4)
1947–1949	Hawthorn	33 (37)
Total		37 (41)
- ^{1} Playing statistics correct to the end of 1949.

Clarence Adair Swenson (23 May 1923 – 28 January 2003) was an Australian rules footballer who played with Collingwood and Hawthorn in the Victorian Football League (VFL).

Swenson came into the Collingwood team from the juniors and made one appearance in the 1941 VFL season. He didn't play for the club again until 1946, due to his war service. In 1947 he crossed to Hawthorn, when he spent three seasons. He was captain-coach of Trafalgar from 1950 to 1954.

Swenson won the 1950 Central Gippsland Football League best and fairest award, the Rodda Medal, Runner up 1951
