= Clarrie Jordon =

Australian rules footballer (1909–1965)

Personal information
- Full name: Clarence Charles Lewis Jordon
- Born: 31 May 1909; Carlton, Victoria
- Died: 30 October 1965 (aged 56); South Melbourne, Victoria
- Original team: Prahran
- Height: 173 cm (5 ft 8 in)
- Weight: 70 kg (154 lb)

Playing career^{1}
| Years | Club | Games (Goals) |
| 1929–33 | Prahran (VFA) | 87 (115) |
| 1934–36 | Richmond | 15 (6) |
- ^{1} Playing statistics correct to the end of 1936.

Clarence Charles Lewis Jordon (31 May 1909 – 30 October 1965) was an Australian rules footballer who played with Richmond in the Victorian Football League (VFL).

== Family ==
The son of Patrick Jordon (1884–1949) and Susan Jordon (1886–1956), née Stirling, Clarence Charles Lewis Jordon was born at Carlton, Victoria, on 31 May 1909.

He married Ada Walters in 1934. Their son, Raymond Clarence "Slug" Jordon (1937–2012), was a Victorian cricketer, an Australian Rules footballer, and a successful Australian Rules coach.

== Death ==
He died at South Melbourne, Victoria on 30 October 1965.
