= Clary DE-60 =

Early transistorized digital computer

The Clary DE-60 was an early transistorized digital computer made by Clary Corporation. It was a compact (desk-sized) general-purpose computer intended for both scientific and business applications. It operated on 18-digit binary-coded decimal words used fixed-point arithmetic. Main memory was a 32-word magnetic drum memory. Input and output devices included a console keyboard, printer, paper tape and punched card system. For programming, the system used sequential instructions from the keyboard and plug-boards. Custom modules for trigonometric and other functions could be installed.

The system was introduced in 1959. By 1961, about 18 systems were operating or on order. Clary Corporation was founded by Hugh L. Clary in 1939. Today the company manufactures products such as uninterruptible power supply systems.
