= Clarrie Dall =

Australian rules footballer

Personal information
- Full name: Clarence Christensen Dall
- Born: 1 September 1887; South Melbourne, Victoria
- Died: 18 December 1953 (aged 66); Glenelg, South Australia
- Original team: Redfern
- Height: 168 cm (5 ft 6 in)

Playing career^{1}
Years	Club	Games (Goals)
1911–1912	Fitzroy	9 (9)
- ^{1} Playing statistics correct to the end of 1912.

Clarence Christensen Dall (1 September 1887 – 18 December 1953) was an Australian rules footballer for Fitzroy in the Victorian Football League (VFL).

Dall began his VFL career for Fitzroy in 1911 and played his final VFL match in 1912 having played 9 matches.

He later served in World War I.
