= Clarrie Williams =

English footballer

Personal information
- Full name: Clarence Williams
- Date of birth: 13 January 1933
- Place of birth: Felling, England
- Date of death: 14 January 2017 (aged 84)
- Place of death: Cleethorpes, England
- Height: 5 ft 9 in (1.75 m)
- Position: Goalkeeper

Senior career*
Years	Team	Apps	(Gls)
1948–1949	Doncaster YMCA		
1949–1953	Doncaster Rovers		
1953–1960	Grimsby Town	188	(0)
1960–1962	Barnsley	24	(0)
- * Club domestic league appearances and goals

Clarence Williams (13 January 1933 – 14 January 2017) was an English professional footballer player who played as a goalkeeper in the Football League for Grimsby Town and Barnsley.
