= MV Clary =

A number of motorships have been named Clary, including:

- MV Clary (1939)
- MV Clary (1965)
