= Clarrie Clowe =

Australian rules footballer

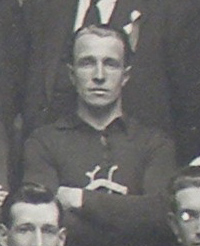
- Cameron in 1921

Personal information
- Full name: Clarence Peter Clowe
- Born: 30 January 1893; Richmond, Victoria
- Died: 10 October 1980 (aged 87); Macleod, Victoria
- Original team: Brunswick
- Height: 170 cm (5 ft 7 in)
- Weight: 72 kg (159 lb)

Playing career^{1}
Years	Club	Games (Goals)
1920–21	Carlton	12 (0)
1922	Essendon	5 (1)
Total		17 (1)
- ^{1} Playing statistics correct to the end of 1922.

Clarence Peter Clowe (30 January 1893 – 10 October 1980) was an Australian rules footballer who played with Carlton and Essendon in the Victorian Football League (VFL).
