= Clarrie Uren =

Australian rules footballer

Personal information
- Full name: Edward Clarence Uren
- Born: 6 January 1900; Boulder, Western Australia
- Died: 3 July 1968 (aged 68); Balwyn, Victoria
- Original team: Kalgoorlie Railways
- Height: 180 cm (5 ft 11 in)
- Weight: 74 kg (163 lb)

Playing career^{1}
Years	Club	Games (Goals)
1924	Carlton	6 (0)
- ^{1} Playing statistics correct to the end of 1924.

Edward Clarence Uren (6 January 1900 – 3 July 1968) was an Australian rules footballer who played with Carlton in the Victorian Football League (VFL).
