= Clarrie Semmel =

Australian rules footballer (1910–2000)

Personal information
- Full name: Clarence Robert Semmel
- Born: 30 April 1910; St Kilda, Victoria
- Died: 7 February 2000 (aged 89)
- Original team: Williamstown (VFA)
- Height: 179 cm (5 ft 10 in)
- Weight: 75 kg (165 lb)

Playing career^{1}
Years	Club	Games (Goals)
1930	North Melbourne	4 (0)
- ^{1} Playing statistics correct to the end of 1930.

Clarence Robert Semmel (30 April 1910 – 7 February 2000) was an Australian rules footballer who played with North Melbourne in the Victorian Football League (VFL).
