= Clarrie Curyer =

Australian rules footballer (1912–2003)

Personal information
- Full name: Clarence Harley Bertram Curyer
- Born: 11 December 1912
- Died: 29 June 2003 (aged 90)
- Original team: Norwood
- Height: 177 cm (5 ft 10 in)
- Weight: 81 kg (179 lb)

Playing career^{1}
Years	Club	Games (Goals)
1932–1933	Norwood	33 (1)
1935–1941	St Kilda	104 (58)
- ^{1} Playing statistics correct to the end of 1941.

Clarence Harley Bertram Curyer (11 December 1912 – 29 June 2003) was an Australian rules footballer who played with Norwood in the South Australian National Football League (SANFL) and St Kilda in the Victorian Football League (VFL).

Curyer, who was originally from Jamestown, was playing for Norwood when he was chosen to represent South Australia at the 1933 Sydney Carnival. In 1935 he joined St Kilda and played 104 games for the club, before transferring to Preston during the 1941 season. He played his football mostly in the back pocket and on the ball. Off the field, he worked in the fire brigade.
