= Cléry =

Cléry is the name or part of the name of the following communes in France:

- Cléry, Côte-d'Or, in the Côte-d'Or department
- Cléry, Savoie, in the Savoie department
- Cléry-en-Vexin, in the Val-d'Oise department
- Cléry-le-Grand, in the Meuse department
- Cléry-le-Petit, in the Meuse department
- Cléry-Saint-André, in the Loiret department
- Cléry-sur-Somme, in the Somme department
- Mézières-lez-Cléry, in the Loiret department
