= Clarrie Wyatt =

Australian rules footballer (1904–1986)

Personal information
- Full name: Clarence Wilfred Wyatt
- Born: 27 April 1904; Northcote, Victoria
- Died: 6 July 1986 (aged 82); Roseville, New South Wales
- Original team: Ballarat
- Height: 175 cm (5 ft 9 in)
- Weight: 73 kg (161 lb)

Playing career^{1}
Years	Club	Games (Goals)
1925	Melbourne	1 (0)
1927–1928	St Kilda	13 (0)
- ^{1} Playing statistics correct to the end of 1928.

Clarence Wilfred Wyatt (27 April 1904 – 6 July 1986) was an Australian rules footballer who played with Melbourne and St Kilda in the Victorian Football League (VFL).
