= Clarrie Featherston =

Australian rules footballer

Personal information
- Full name: Clarence Sydney Featherston
- Born: 11 December 1892; Carlton, Victoria
- Died: 22 June 1964 (aged 71); Macleod, Victoria
- Original team: Fitzroy Church of Christ
- Height: 182 cm (6 ft 0 in)

Playing career^{1}
Years	Club	Games (Goals)
1918–19	Fitzroy	14 (4)
- ^{1} Playing statistics correct to the end of 1919.

Clarence Sydney Featherston (11 December 1892 – 22 June 1964) was an Australian rules footballer who played with Fitzroy in the Victorian Football League (VFL).
