= Clarrie Kemp =

Australian rugby league footballer

Personal information
- Full name: Clarence Charles Kemp
- Born: 31 October 1913; Rockdale, New South Wales, Australia
- Died: 8 July 1943 (aged 29); Hawkesbury River railway bridge, New South Wales, Australia

Playing information
- Position: Second-row
Club
Years	Team	Pld	T	G	FG	P
1932–33	St. George	13	1	0	0	3
Representative
Years	Team	Pld	T	G	FG	P
1933	NSW City	1	0	0	0	0

Clarence Charles Kemp (31 October 1913 – 8 July 1943) was an Australian rugby league footballer who played in the 1930s.

A local junior from The Banksia junior rugby league football club, Kemp was graded in 1932. He played first grade between 1932-33 and remained with the club for a number of seasons in the lower grades until 1937.

Kemp died in an accident on the Hawksbury River Bridge on 8 July 1943.
