= Clary Hood Smith =

American politician (1928–2019)

Member of the South Carolina House of Representatives from the Spartanburg County district
- In office 1963–1966

Personal details
- Born: September 20, 1928 Spartanburg, South Carolina
- Died: January 10, 2019 (aged 90) Spartanburg, South Carolina
- Occupation: Fuel Oil Dealer

Clary Hood Smith (September 20, 1928 – January 10, 2019) was an American politician in the state of South Carolina. He served in the South Carolina House of Representatives from 1963 to 1966, representing Spartanburg County, South Carolina. He was a fuel oil dealer.
