= Clarrie Sullivan =

Australian rules footballer

Personal information
- Full name: Clarence Archibald Sullivan
- Born: 5 April 1898; Maryborough, Victoria
- Died: 30 September 1978 (aged 80); Balaclava, Victoria
- Original teams: Williamstown, Maryborough Railways FC

Playing career^{1}
Years	Club	Games (Goals)
1924–25	St Kilda	9 (0)
- ^{1} Playing statistics correct to the end of 1925.

Clarence Archibald Sullivan (5 April 1898 – 30 September 1978) was an Australian rules footballer. He played with St Kilda in the Victorian Football League (VFL).
