= Clarrie Tolson =

Australian rules footballer (1911–1989)

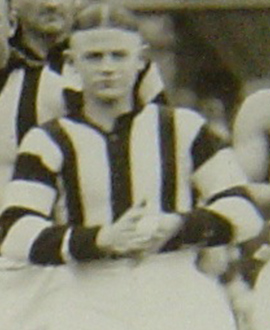
- Tolson in 1931

Personal information
- Full name: Clarence William Joseph Tolson
- Born: 17 November 1911; Collingwood, Victoria
- Died: 24 June 1989 (aged 77)
- Original team: Abbotsford
- Height: 170 cm (5 ft 7 in)
- Weight: 68 kg (150 lb)

Playing career^{1}
Years	Club	Games (Goals)
1931	Collingwood	7 (2)
- ^{1} Playing statistics correct to the end of 1931.

Clarence William Joseph Tolson (17 November 1911 – 24 June 1989) was an Australian rules footballer who played with Collingwood in the Victorian Football League (VFL).
