= Silver Sage, Fort Worth, Texas =

Neighborhood in Fort Worth, Texas

Coordinates: 32.8609°N 97.2850°W

Silver Sage is an area/community located in north-east Fort Worth, Texas, in an area around Silver Sage park on Silver Sage drive. The community is actually composed of several separate neighborhoods, but people often refer it as one big neighborhood. Silver Sage is a lower to middle class community populated mostly by African-Americans, Whites, Hispanics, and Asians.

== Recreation ==
Silver Sage Park provides the community with many outdoor activities, such as soccer, baseball, basketball, and football. Bluebonnet elementary School Park is also in the area.

== Education ==
Silver Sage is located within Keller ISD.

- Fossil Ridge High School
- Fossil Hill Middle school
- Hillwood Middle School
- Parkwood Hill Intermediate
- Chisholm Trail Intermediate
- Bluebonnet Elementary School
- Heritage Elementary School
- North Riverside Elementary
