= Clarrie Answerth =

Australian rules footballer (1901–1981)

Personal information
- Full name: Clarence Jacob Answerth
- Born: 27 May 1901; Richmond, Victoria
- Died: 28 May 1981 (aged 80); Coburg, Victoria
- Original team: Public Service Football Club
- Height: 179 cm (5 ft 10 in)
- Weight: 84 kg (185 lb)

Playing career^{1}
Years	Club	Games (Goals)
1928–29	Hawthorn	18 (3)
- ^{1} Playing statistics correct to the end of 1929.

Clarence Jacob Answerth (27 May 1901 – 28 May 1981) was an Australian rules footballer who played with Hawthorn in the Victorian Football League (VFL).
