= Clarrie Fahy =

Australian rugby league footballer and administrator

Clarence Wilfred Fahy
- Clarrie Fahy. 1941
- Born: 23 March 1898; Sydney, New South Wales, Australia
- Died: 17 April 1963 (aged 65); Rockdale, New South Wales
- Occupation: rugby league administrator
- Military career
- Allegiance: Australia
- Branch: Australian Army
- Service years: 1915-1918; 1940-1945
- Conflicts: World War I; World War II

Clarence Wilfred 'Clarrie' Fahy (1898–1963) was an Australian rugby league administrator in the pioneer days of the St. George District Rugby league Football Club and later with the NSWRFL.

== Administrative career and war service ==
Clarrie Fahy was born in Sydney on 23 March 1898 and he went on to become St. George's third Hon. Secretary, a hard and effective worker, that held a great feeling for the club. His involvement in Australian rugby league pre-dated St. George. He played with the Banksia Waratahs before World War One, he then served in the Great War and linked with Saints in 1922.

Fahy became the Third Grade Secretary in 1926, then took over from Reg Fusedale as club secretary in 1938. He stayed as club secretary until 1944 then he was elected a vice-president of the NSWRFL in the same year during his service in World War Two.

He went on to become a member of the ARL Board Of Control, and was later named team-manager of the 1956–1957 Kangaroo touring team for England and France.

== Accolades ==
Clarrie Fahy was awarded Life membership of the St. George Dragons in 1952. He was also a Life Member of the NSWRL in 1949 and a Life Member of Kogarah R.S.L Club

== Death ==
His death in April 1963 was widely mourned. "Clarrie Fahy will be long remembered for his fair thinking on all football matters," said then NSWRFL President Bill Buckley in a ringing tribute. Clarrie Fahy died at Rockdale, New South Wales, on 17 April 1963.
