= Clarrie Lane =

Australian rules footballer

Personal information
- Full name: Clarence Lane
- Born: 12 April 1934 (age 92)
- Original team: South Melbourne YCW
- Height: 171 cm (5 ft 7 in)
- Weight: 73 kg (161 lb)

Playing career^{1}
Years	Club	Games (Goals)
1954–57	South Melbourne	23 (19)
- ^{1} Playing statistics correct to the end of 1957.

Clarence Lane (born 12 April 1934) is a former Australian rules footballer who played with South Melbourne in the Victorian Football League (VFL).
