= Number of Identified Specimens =

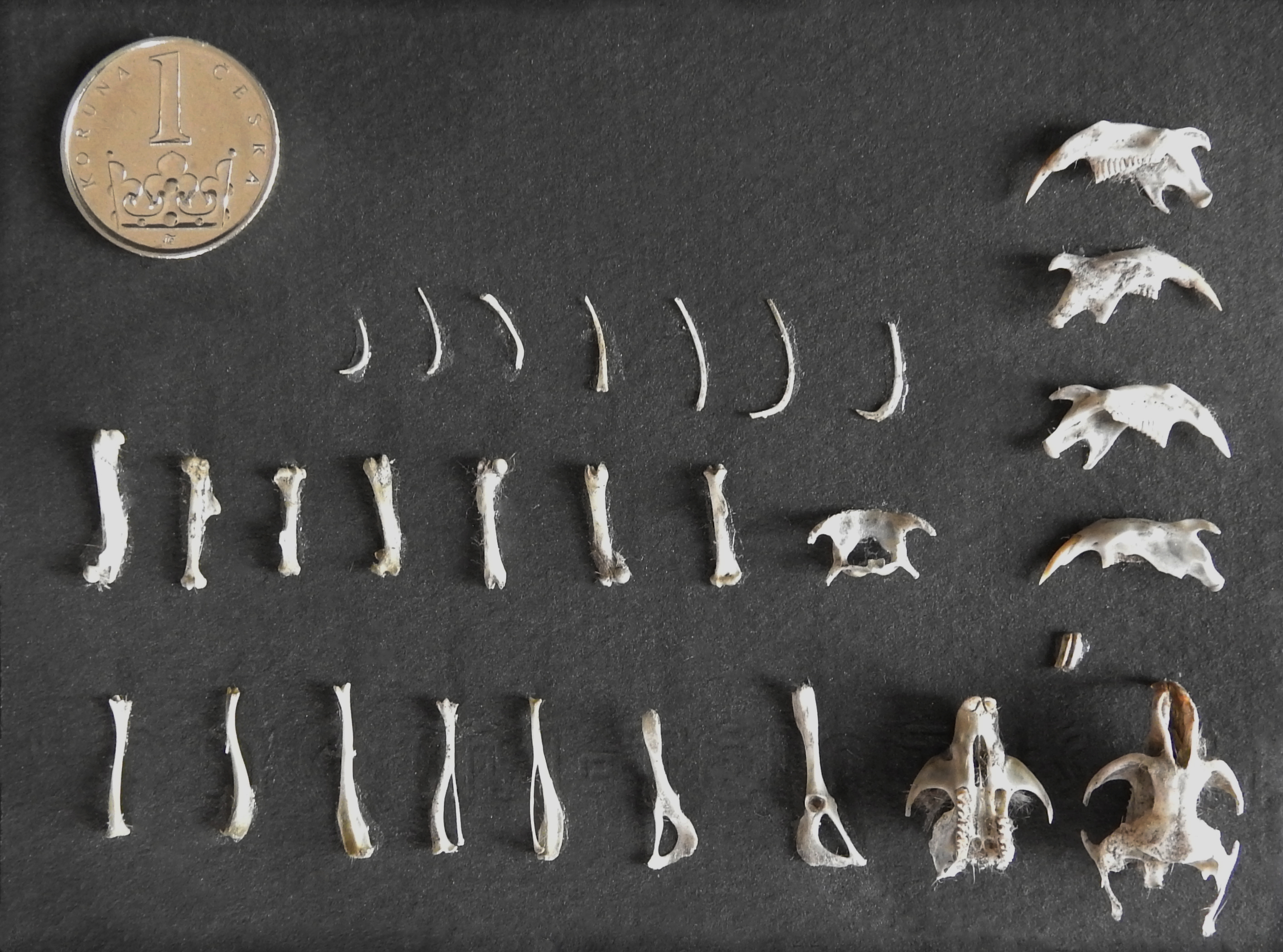
A set of mammal bones which may be from several specimens

In various archaeological disciplines including archaeology, forensic anthropology, bioarchaeology, osteoarchaeology and zooarchaeology, the number of identified specimens (also number of individual specimens or number of individual species), or NISP, is defined as the number of identified specimens for a specific site. It is used to estimate how many different individual specimens are present.

When evaluating the potential benefits of new sites or specimens, the three most commonly used quantification units by archaeology are NISP, minimum number of elements (MNE), and minimum number of individuals (MNI).

The NISP is the most basic quantity recorded about an osteological assemblage. It counts the number of skeletal elements identified by bone type and taxon, and was first used in zooarchaeology. To calculate the NISP, bones are sorted into taxa (when dealing with a mixed species assemblage) and then into skeletal element types.

An alternative estimate to the NISP, often done in concert, is the MNI. Both are influenced by fragmentation and degree of preservation, but in different ways. In practice, the NISP will normally be higher than the MNI; for example, if the NISP is 100 human femurs and 60 horse hooves, the MNI will be at least 50 humans and 15 horses. The NISP tends to overestimate the number of individuals under moderate fragmentation (for example, two partial ulnas could belong to the same individual or two different ones). However, the overestimate lessens as fragmentation increases due to the inability to classify the bones. MNI tends to underestimate the actual number under medium fragmentation, and even more severely when bones are highly fragmented. Under hypothetically perfect preservation and no fragmentation, these estimates should be the same. MNI also suffers from the aggregation problem, in which different aggregations will generate at least two values, an MNI minimum and maximum, which are generally empirically indistinguishable. Both NISP and MNI are likely only ordinal scale measurements, which means at best they can only give an ordered series of taxonomic abundance, i.e. "Taxon A is more numerous than Taxon B."

NISP is a basic technique that is widely used for estimating the relative abundance of specimens in a collection. Some see it as a basic classification of a site or skeleton and there are many ways to calculate it. NISP will inflate the statistical significance if used to calculate a sample size for inferential statistics; instead MNI is used.

Discussing cutting is a common practice in cutting-edge archaeology. However, there may currently be no consensus on the best way to quantify them due to many problems at archaeology sites. To avoid this issue, archeologists can compute experimental methods to evaluate manipulative streak patterns with very fragmented simulated forelimbs and hindlimbs, with reduced use of NISP due to quantification units and footprint.

In addition, the frequencies of the ordinal scale of the anatomical parts of the crest (proximal, marginal, distal) are not constant and fluctuate in simulators. The paleontological analytical results show the significant differences between the two quantitative methods.

== Modern uses ==
=== Cut-mark analyses ===
Archaeological sites give vital information concerning the massacre, and the examination of the traces provides that knowledge. Colored bands have been used to study anything from the evolutionary impacts of meat-eating in Africa to culturally mediated slaughter patterns in the United States. Abe et al. (2002); Dominguez, Rodrigo & Iravedra (2009); Fischer (1995), pp. 12–18; Lyman (1987); Lyman (1994b), pp. 297–314; Nielssen (2000); White (1992), pp. 143–146 are examples of researchers from other nations.

The cut-mark pattern is usually determined by observing the frequency and relative location of cuts on skeletal parts. These patterns are then related to butcher behavior, frequently utilizing ethnographic, factual, and empirical data as a frame of reference. Although analysts' approaches for quantifying, assessing, and reporting landmarks vary depending on their study aims, differences in samples and conclusions owing to methodologies and units of quantification have not been experimentally investigated.

=== Cut-mark studies and two types of quantitative analysis ===
In general, most tracing studies use two types of quantification: one used to identify and explain the anatomical part of the group, and one used to determine the frequency of cutting the anatomical part described above. The anatomical segment is usually determined by the specified NISP or the MNE. Similar to MNE, some researchers use cMNE. When using MNE or cMNE as a quantitative unit, archaeologists usually refer to the complete skeletal component (e.g., femur). Archaeologists need to be clear about what they wish to discover and how this will be done, unless some bone element is otherwise specified (e.g., proximal femur, distal femur).

The NISP, on the other hand, is a unit of measurement associated with a particular sample that may or may not be a complete structural element but is identified as part and sometimes as a complete structural element. In the case of lines, two quantitative units are widely used to measure them. This is the number of glass pieces and the number of samples to hold the glass panes, which was subsequently identified as the number of glass pieces. After calculating the number of cuts, the results were analyzed and reported as a percentage of the total NISP with observed cuts (%NISPcut) or as a percentage of the total MNC with observed cuts. Close to (%MNEcut). Although %NISPcut and %MNEcut are units of quantitative analysis commonly used in cut-off studies, their reliability has rarely been assessed in the context of bone segmentation.

=== Fragment count ===
The cut-mark count is a count of how many individual cut-marks, or collections of cut-marks are in a given skeletal area, while fragment count is the level of the full-scale number of quantitative units (e.g., NISP or MNE) with saw cut-marks. Cut-mark piece considers are, when in doubt, detailed %NISPcut, the level of the complete NISP showing cut-marks NISPcut. Abe et al. (2002) identified an ordinary issue with this technique. They showed that because of abnormality and bone breakdown, %NISPcut possibly underrates the level of models with cut-marks.

This is generally the circumstance considering the way that cut-marks are inflicted on a skeletal part during butchery when defleshing and disarticulating a creature. These cycles are commonly performed before breakage related to the extraction of inner bone materials like marrow and oil. Abe et al. (2002) propose that if a skeletal part, say the femur, was defleshed and disarticulated, the level of cut-mark examples of the immovable number of models ought to be 1-to-1, thinking about the way that, for this current situation, the outright part is additionally a model (%NISPcut 1/4100). Notwithstanding, after that equivalent part is dealt with for marrow and segregated, the level of cut-mark models can end up being more fundamental, speculatively, 2/8 (articular fruitions despite screw regions; %NISPcut 1/425).

The fragmentation cycle causing this model is clear concerning cut-marks surface region identical to the whole surface region all through a total bone. However, on the off chance that totally covered by cut-marks, undeniably the surface region expected by cut-marks all through a skeletal part will be by and large insignificant contrasting with the excess, whole surface area. Fittingly, in the event that the bone brokenness process isn't specifically focusing on cut-marked surfaces, the imbalanced extent of cut and whole surface regions ought to persistently pass a further degree of whole portions onto cut parts, conclusively developing the essential relative capability between the two (1/1).

Considering that skeletal part surfaces are not totally covered by cut-marks, there ought to ordinarily be even more whole surface regions open to section. Anyway, notwithstanding how there is a reasonable potential for break cycles to cause a biasing influence, zooarchaeologists truly don't have even the remotest hint about the level of this impact on the units used to evaluate cut-marks, or, on the butchery surmisings found utilizing these units. The motivation driving this study is to assist shed with some lighting on the impacts of breaks on cut-mark assessments.

One answer for the break issue is the utilization of mechanical refitting as a curation system got together with the cMNE as a quantitative unit of assessment. All around, refitting plays had a principal sway in broadening the accuracy of skeletal element identification, quantification, and the derivation of standards of lead. The use of refitting has additionally been proposed for assessments of cortical surface modification while get-together fragmentation and thickness interceded reliable adversity is high.

As its name proposes, the cMNE broadly addresses the base number of parts present in a model, by including all apportioned models after they are redone. In a general sense, the cMNE can be seen as a quantitative unit that endeavors to most enthusiastically address the primary skeletal part rehash present in a model. Precisely when models are genuinely revamped and quantified as cMNE, the impacts of brokenness on how much cut and whole skeletal parts will be traded by diminishing the degree of whole units to cut-marks units. Thusly the effect of brokenness ought to be less breaking point on changed units than on units not depending on refitting (e.g., NISP). In any case, contrasts between the two quantitative units, if any, have not been intentionally investigated or quantified likely, nor has the inferential effect of either unit been surveyed.

== The effects of NISP on cut-mark analyses ==
NISP can mislead the cut-mark conclusions based on strips. Even though, because the differences between identical markers and elongated bones were large, differences between anatomical sites had the greatest impact on Butcher's conclusions. This has a potentially dangerous direct effect on the butcher's conclusions about size. Also, while a close correlation of two 1s on an ordinal scale can be seen as an indicator of a high degree of similarity, modern mathematical "machines" are not equipped with computational methods, and differences in ranks may not be statistically significant. Deviations may change the interpretation of the massacre by archaeologists.

== Sources ==
- Abe K, et al. (Belle Collaboration) (2002). "Observation of $\chi_{(c2)}$ Production in $B$ Meson Decay". Physical Review Letters. 89 (1). 011803. arXiv:hep-ex/0202028. doi:10.1103/PhysRevLett.89.011803. ISSN 0031-9007. OCLC 439554716. PMID 12097032. S2CID 36795205.
- Lyman, Lee R. (2008) Quantitative Paleozoology. Cambridge: Cambridge University Press.

=== Missing sources ===
- Bunn (1982).
- Fischer (1995).
- Lyman (1994b).
- Marean (2004).
- Nilssen (2000).
- White (1992).
- Bartram (1993). ;
- Bunn (1981). ;
- Bunn (1983). ;
- Dewberry; Russell (2007). ;
- Dominguez; Rodrigo; Iravedra (2009). ;
- Frison (1970). ;
- Guilday (1962). ;
- Lyman (1987). ;
- Lyman (2005). ;
- Marean; Kim (1998). ;
- Nielssen (2000). ;
- Rapson; Todd (1992). ;
