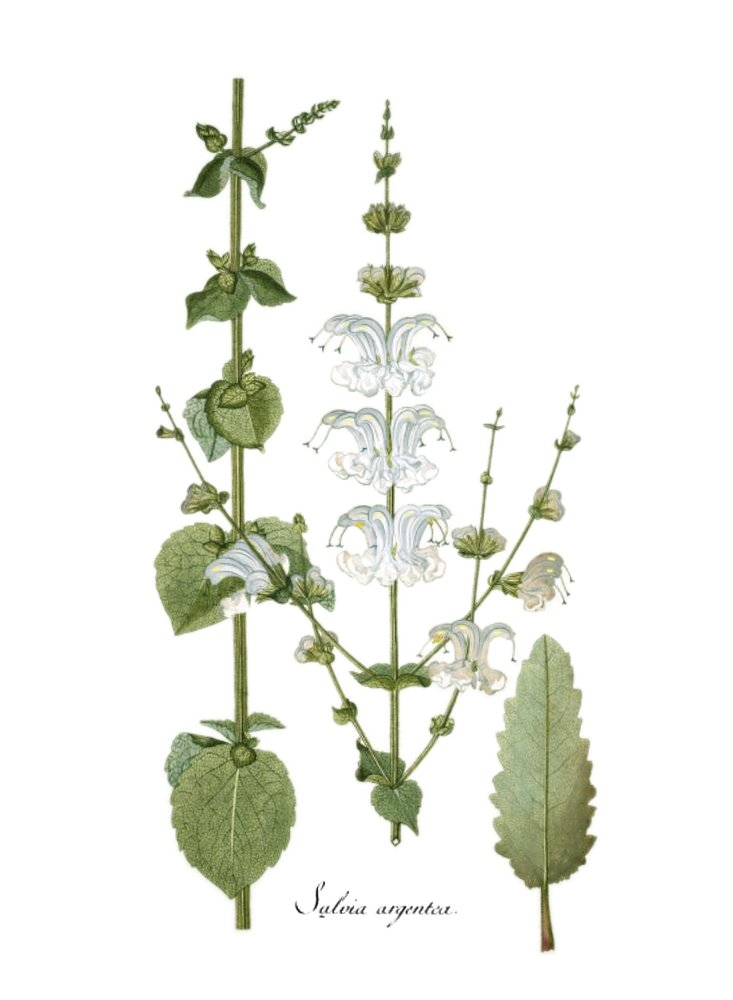

Scientific classification
- Kingdom: Plantae
- Clade: Tracheophytes
- Clade: Angiosperms
- Clade: Eudicots
- Clade: Asterids
- Order: Lamiales
- Family: Lamiaceae
- Genus: Salvia
- Species: S. argentea

Binomial name
- Salvia argentea L.

= Salvia argentea =

Species of flowering plant

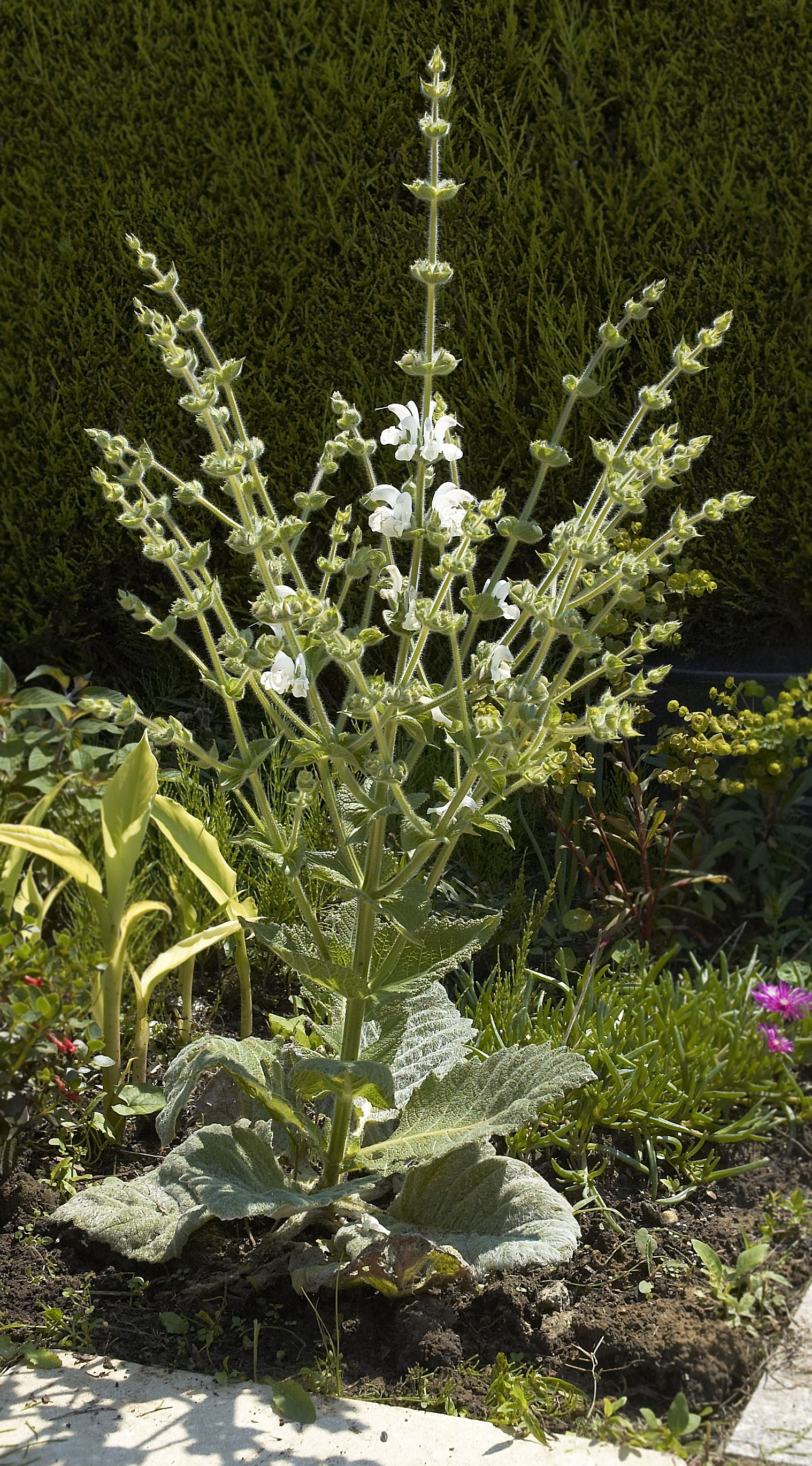

Salvia argentea, the silver sage, silver salvia, or silver clary, is a biennial or short-lived perennial plant that is native to an area in southern Europe from Portugal to Bulgaria. Its Latin specific epithet argentea means "silvery", referring to the colour of the leaves.

== Description ==
Salvia argentea has a large spread of basal leaves that measure 1 m (3.3 ft) wide and 30 to 60 cm (0.98 to 1.97 ft) high. The individual leaves are 20 to 30 cm (7.9 to 11.8 in) long and 15 cm (5.9 in) wide. Both leaf surfaces are heavily covered with silky hairs that give it a wooly appearance. The leaves are soft to the touch, first emerging as a distinctive silvery white and then turning to grey-green after flowering. Cool weather in the autumn turns the leaves silvery again.

Flowers appear in spring or summer on 60 to 90 cm (24 to 35 in) candelabra-like stalks that rise well above the foliage. The inconspicuous white flowers are tinged with yellow or pink. Cutting the flowers before they set seed results in a long-lived plant.

Salvia argentea has received the Royal Horticultural Society's Award of Garden Merit. It requires a south-facing position in full sun. Although hardy down to −15 °C (5 °F) it dislikes the combination of winter wet and freezing temperatures. It may therefore be short-lived.
