= Clarrie Jordan =

English footballer

Personal information
- Full name: Clarence Jordan
- Date of birth: 20 June 1922
- Place of birth: South Kirkby, England
- Date of death: 24 February 1992 (aged 69)
- Place of death: Doncaster, England
- Position: Striker

Senior career*
Years	Team	Apps	(Gls)
–1940	Upton Colliery		
1940–1948	Doncaster Rovers	60	(48)
1948–1954	Sheffield Wednesday	92	(36)
- * Club domestic league appearances and goals

Clarrie Jordan (20 June 1922 – 24 February 1992) was an English professional footballer who played as a centre forward for Upton Colliery, Doncaster Rovers and Sheffield Wednesday. He holds the Doncaster record of 42 league goals scored in one season, and jointly holds the record of scoring in 10 consecutive games in the Football League.

== Playing career ==
Jordan started his football playing for Upton Colliery before joining Doncaster in April 1940.

=== Doncaster Rovers ===
During the war years he scored 63 goals in 102 games for Rovers, plus he made guest appearances for Leeds United, Aldershot Town, Birmingham City and Derby County.

He made his full debut for Doncaster in the 3rd Division North on 31 August 1946, winning 2–1 at home against Rochdale. That season was to be record breaking for both Clarrie and Doncaster, as he took the still standing club record of goals scored in one season, and they got the most points for any club in a league of 22 teams and with the two points for a win system, also still standing.

In that season he was the League's top scorer, and scored three hat-tricks and got a club and League record of scoring in ten consecutive games. Only John Aldridge and Jermain Defoe have equalled this feat in the Football League.

The following season in the higher league he scored 6 in 19 league appearances.

=== Sheffield Wednesday ===
In February 1948 he was sold to nearby Sheffield Wednesday scoring on his debut against Bradford Park Avenue. That first season he scored only 2 more goals in 14 further appearances. The following season, he scored 14 in 33 games, and in the 1949-50 promotion season he netted 12 times in 26 games including 4 in a game against Hull.

Jordan struggled for the remainder of his footballing life with injury and loss of form though he did score 6 goals in 12 matches in the First Division in the 1953–54 season. The following season, he played his final game on 18 September at Brammall Lane against Sheffield United.

== Honours ==
=== Doncaster Rovers ===
- Football League Third Division North winner: 1946–47
- Football League Third Division North top scorer: 1946–47

== Records ==
=== Football League ===
- Scoring in ten consecutive league games: 1946–47

(Jointly held with John Aldridge and Jermain Defoe)

=== Doncaster Rovers ===
- Most League goals in one season: 42, 1946–47
- Scoring in consecutive games: 10, 1946–47

== Personal life ==
In later life he was landlord of the Schoolboy Inn at Norton, Doncaster.
