= 1932 NSWRFL season =

Rugby league competition

1932 New South Wales Rugby Football League
- Teams: 8
- Premiers: South Sydney (11th title)
- Minor premiers: South Sydney (9th title)
- Matches played: 60
- Points scored: 1810
- Top points scorer(s): Les Mead (104 points)
- Wooden spoon: North Sydney (4th spoon)
- Top try-scorer(s): Alan Ridley (18 tries)

The 1932 New South Wales Rugby Football League premiership was the twenty-fifth season of Sydney’s top-level rugby league competition, Australia’s first. During the season, which lasted from April until September, eight teams from across the city contested the premiership, culminating in South Sydney’s victory over Western Suburbs in the final.

== Teams ==
- Balmain, formed on January 23, 1908, at Balmain Town Hall
- Eastern Suburbs, formed on January 24, 1908, at Paddington Town Hall
- Newtown, formed on January 14, 1908
- North Sydney, formed on February 7, 1908
- South Sydney, formed on January 17, 1908, at Redfern Town Hall
- St. George, formed on November 8, 1920, at Kogarah School of Arts
- Western Suburbs, formed on February 4, 1908
- University, formed in 1919 at Sydney University

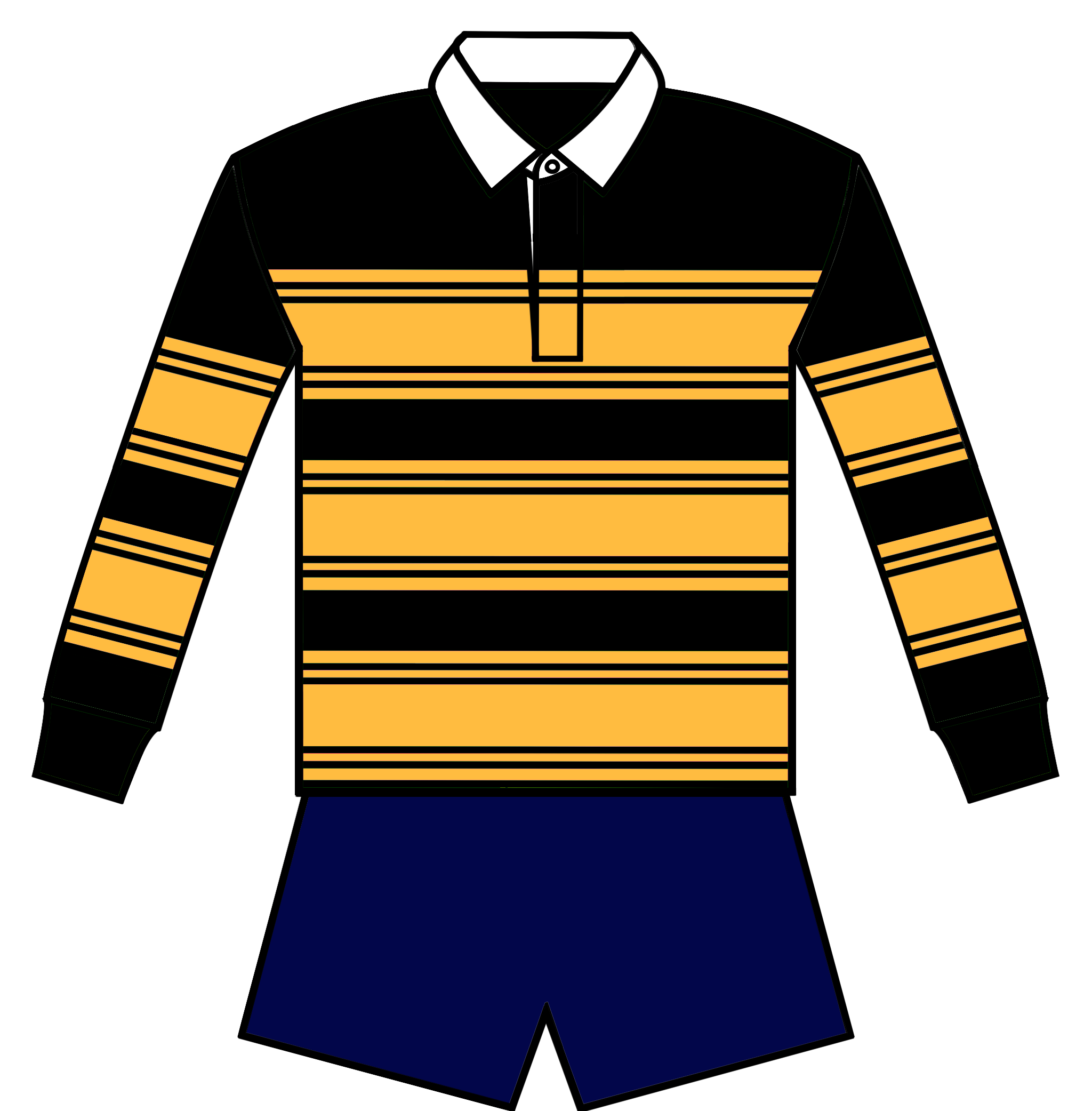
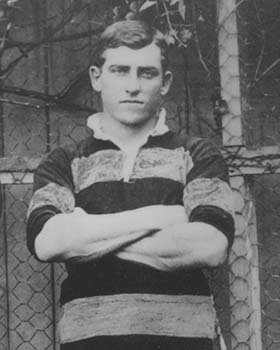
Balmain 25th season Ground: Birchgrove Oval Coach: Charles Fraser; Captain: Charlie Roberts

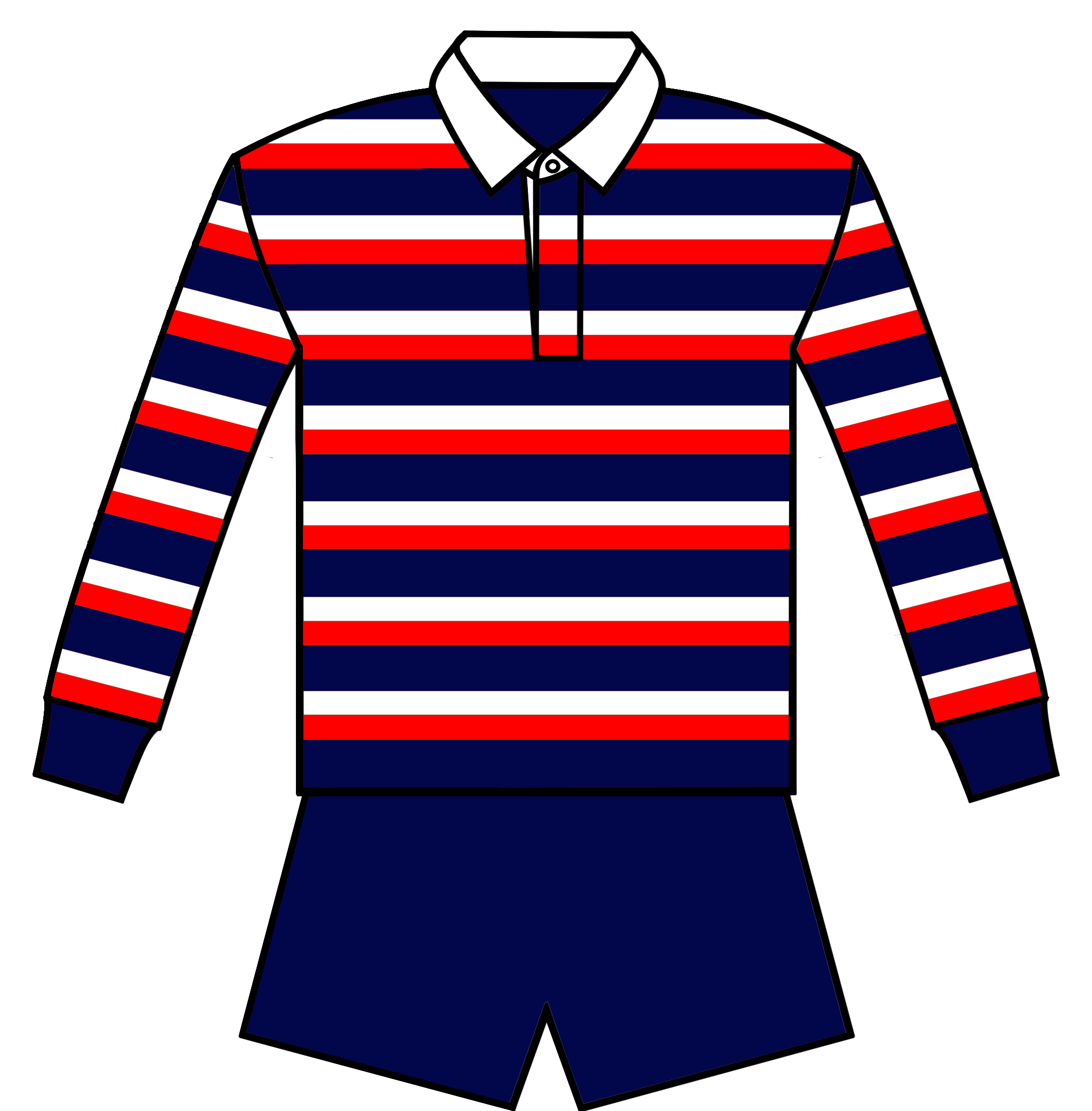
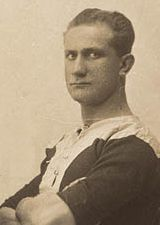
Eastern Suburbs 25th season Ground: Sydney Sports Ground Coach: Frank Burge; Captain: Joe Pearce

Newtown 25th season Ground: Marrickville Oval; Captain: Tom Ellis

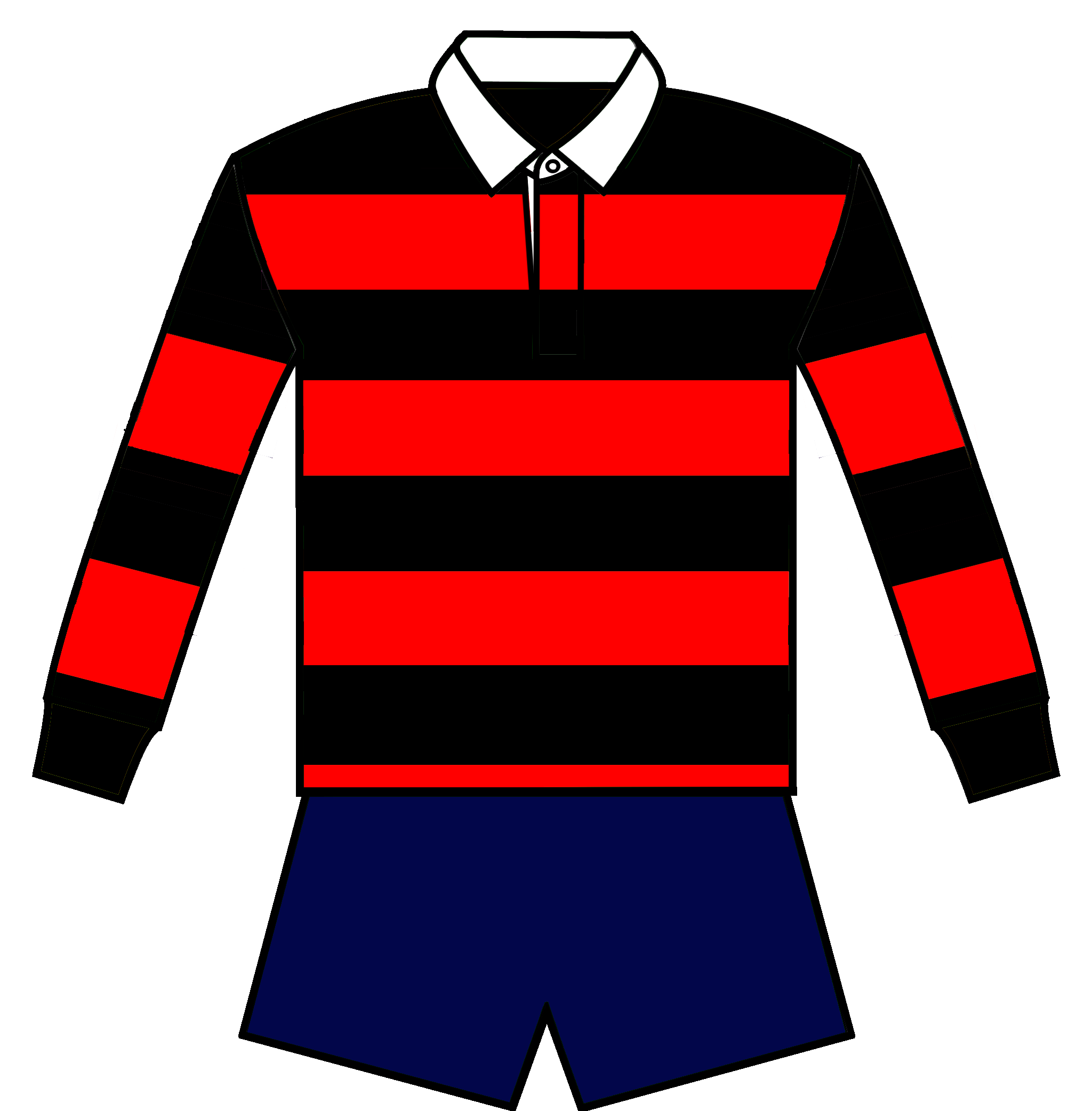
North Sydney 25th Season; Ground: North Sydney Oval; Captain: Bill Leckie

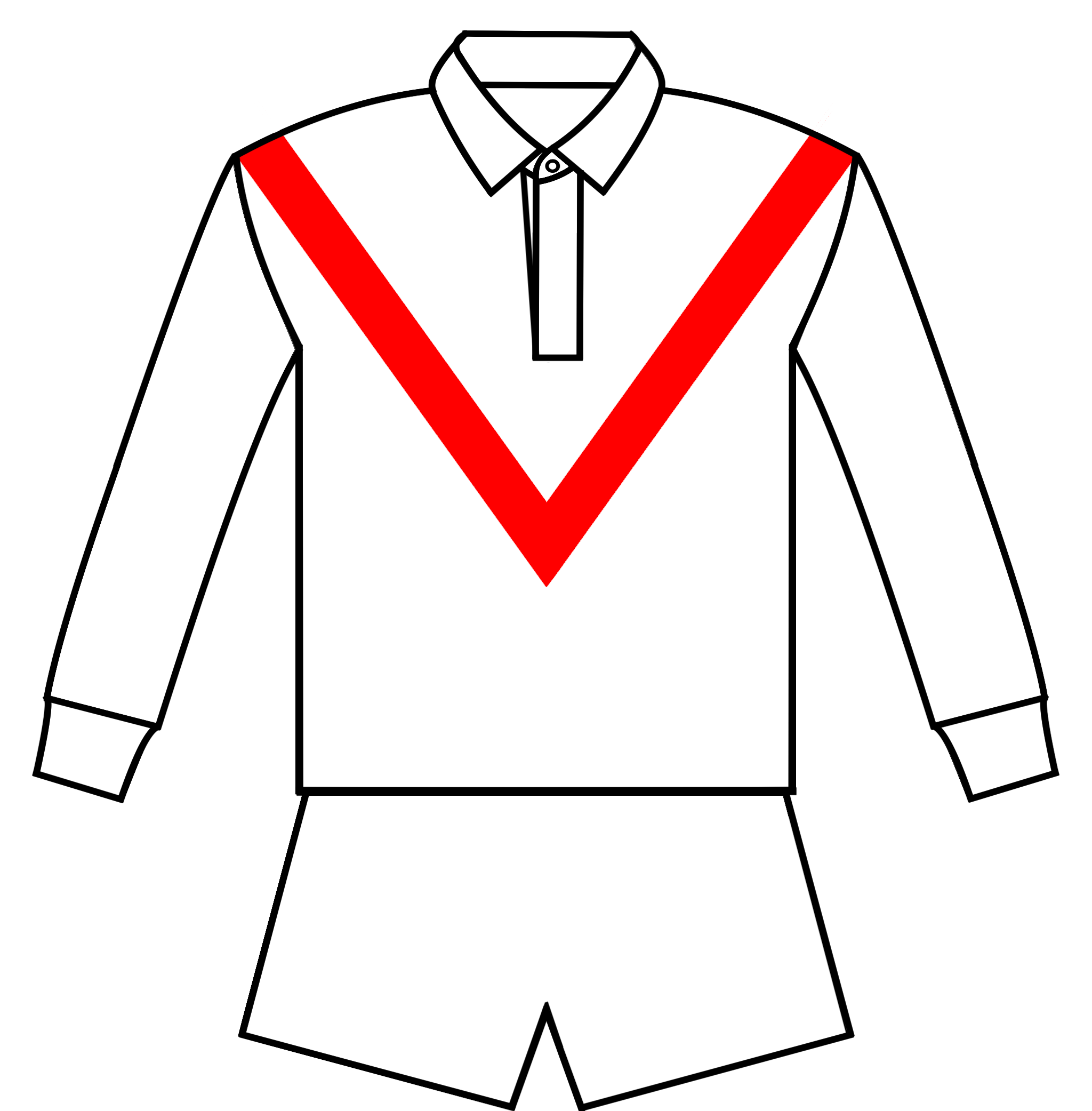
St. George 12th season Ground: Earl Park; Coach: Harry Kadwell Captain: Arthur Justice

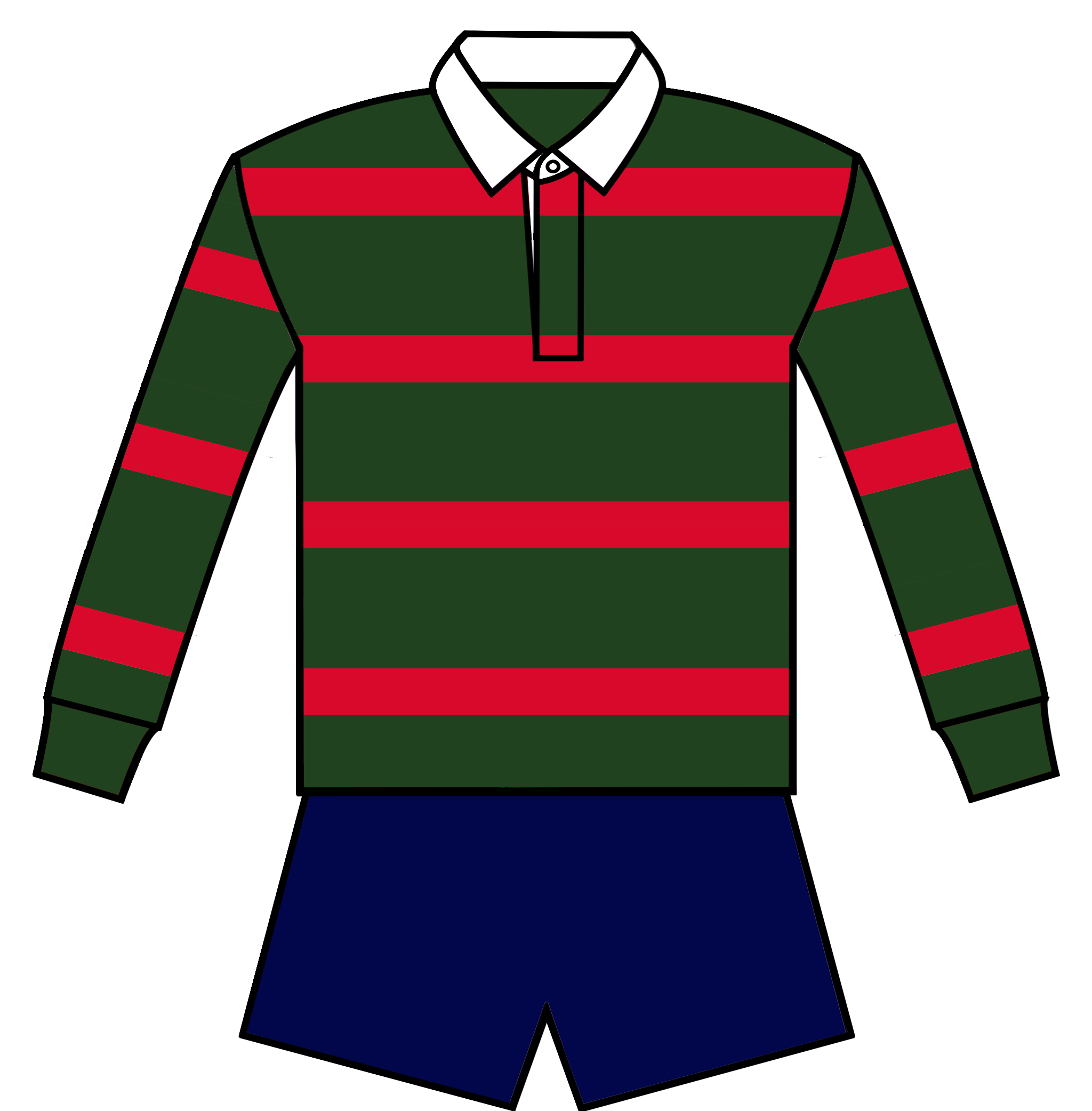
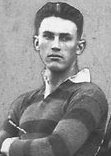
South Sydney 25th season Ground: Sydney Sports Ground; Coach: Charlie Lynch Captain: George Treweek

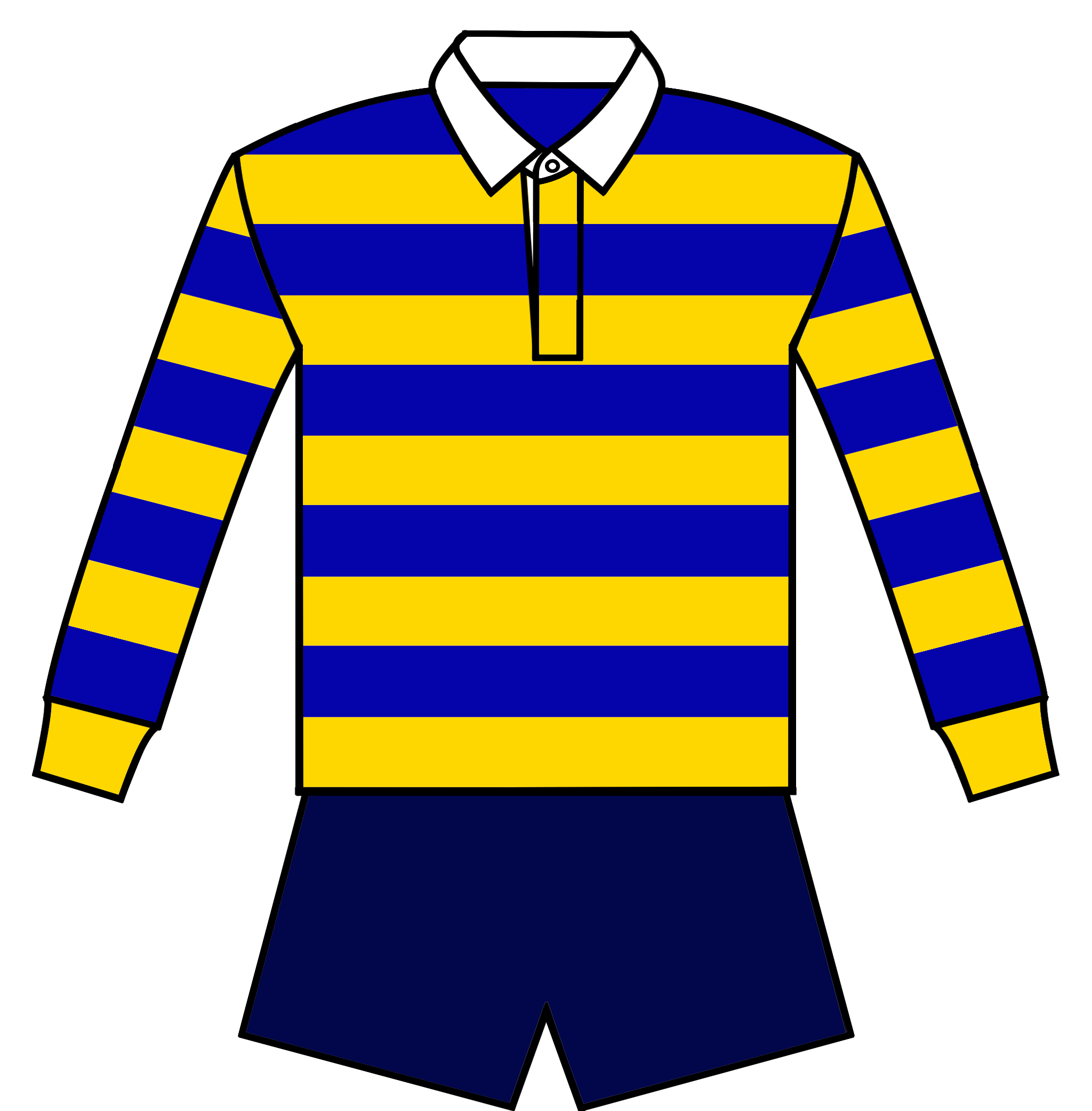
University 13th season Captain: Sammy Ogg

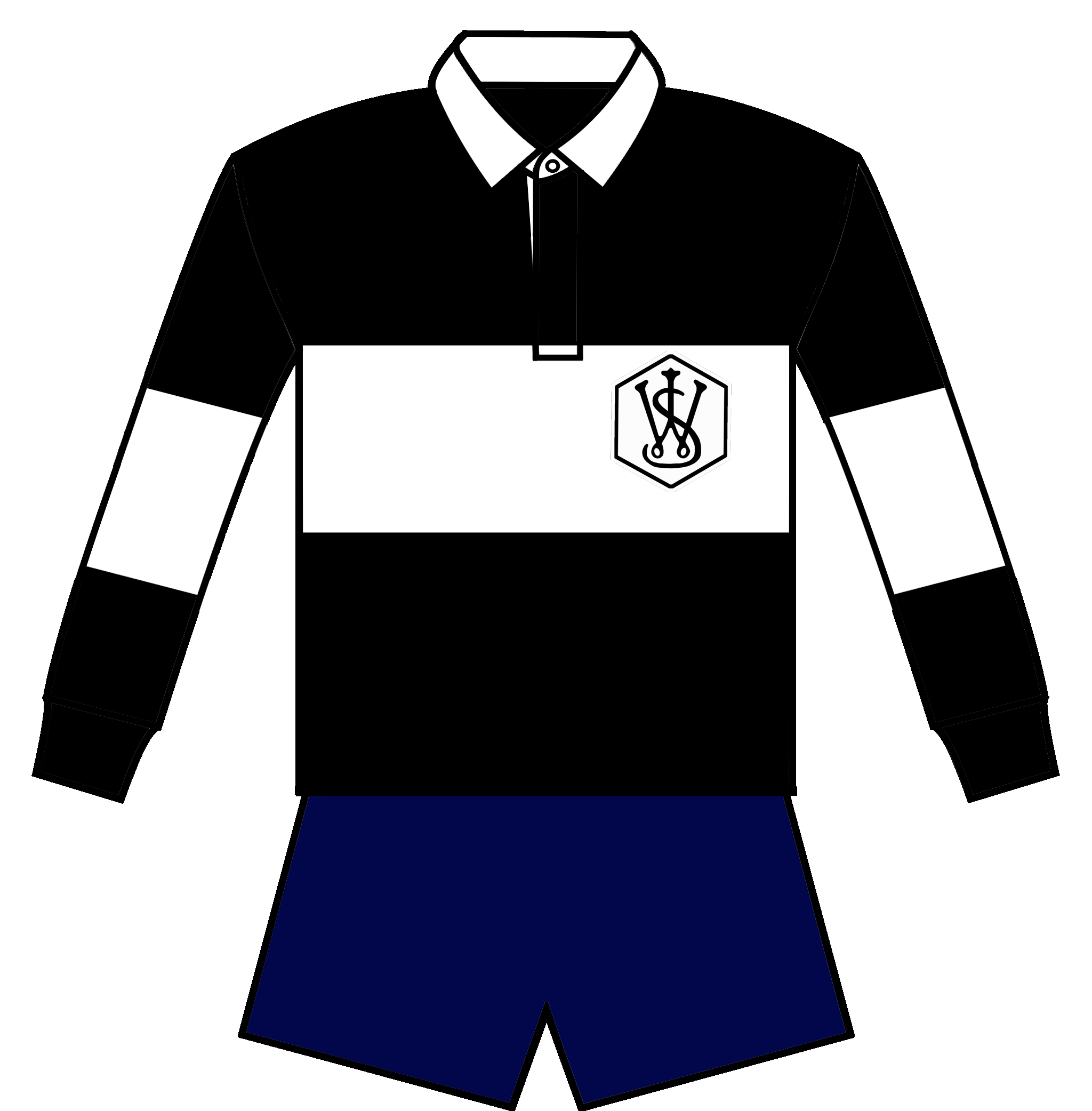
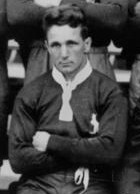
Western Suburbs 25th season Ground: Pratten Park Coach: Jim Craig; Captain: Bill Brogan

== Ladder ==
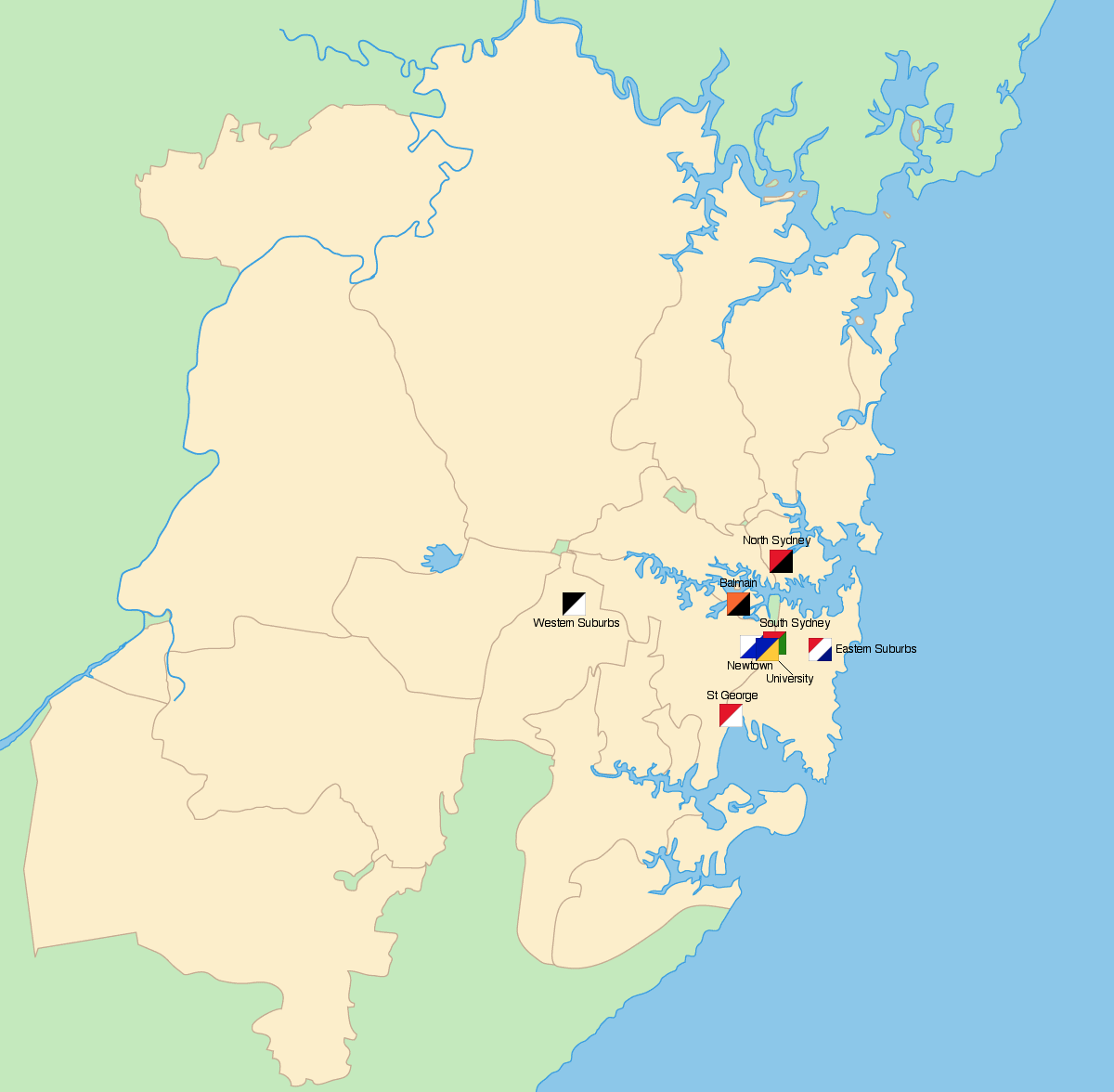
The geographical locations of the teams that contested the 1932 premiership across Sydney.

	Team	Pld	W	D	L	PF	PA	PD	Pts
1	South Sydney	14	13	0	1	292	130	+162	26
2	Western Suburbs	14	11	0	3	321	156	+165	22
3	Eastern Suburbs	14	9	0	5	253	133	+120	18
4	Balmain	14	7	1	6	204	227	-23	15
5	Newtown	14	7	0	7	201	251	-50	14
6	St. George	14	4	1	9	140	203	-63	9
7	Sydney University	14	2	0	12	134	275	-141	4
8	North Sydney	14	2	0	12	147	317	-170	4

== Finals ==
In the two semi finals, the top two ranked teams South Sydney and Western Suburbs beat their lower-ranked opponents Eastern Suburbs and Balmain, respectively. The two winners then played in a final in which favourites and minor premiers South Sydney were beaten by Western Suburbs. However the finals system set in place then forced the final to be replayed, in what was known as the "Right of Challenge". This system ensured that in the event that the minor premiers lost in either the first or second round of the finals, then they would be given a second chance no matter what in what would later become the final premiership decider.

Semi-finals
3 September 1932 - Sports Ground
South Sydney	26
Eastern Suburbs	8
10 September 1932 - Sports Ground
Western Suburbs	15
Balmain	7

Final
17 September 1932 - Sports Ground
South Sydney	19
Western Suburbs	12

=== Grand Final ===
South Sydney	Position	Western Suburbs
22. Albert Spillane	FB	1. Frank McMillan
9. Benny Wearing	WG	15. Alan Ridley
15. Alby Black	CE	3. Cliff Pearce
29. Pat Maher	CE	5. Ray Morris
12. Jack Why	WG	59. Harry Rankine
7. Jim Deeley	FE	7. Les Mead
6. Percy Williams	HB	6. Jack McGlinn
19. Eddie Root	PR	11. Cecil Rhodes
16. Jack Peterson	HK	12. Bob Lindfield
3. Frank Curran	PR	17. Bill Brogan (c)
20. George Treweek (c)	SR	10. Charlie Cornwell
5. Frank O'Connor	SR	16. Bill Ryan
1. Eric Lewis	LK	8. Frank Sponberg
Charlie Lynch	Coach	Jim Craig

In the Grand Final, South Sydney beat Western Suburbs 19–12 to take away their seventh premiership in eight years.

The match was played on Saturday, 24 September 1932 at the Sydney Sports Ground and refereed by Lal Deane before a crowd of 16,925. It was a titanic battle in which Souths led 9–2 at half-time before Wests fought back to level at 12–12. Minutes from full-time a towering penalty goal by Benny Wearing edged Souths ahead 14–12 before they closed out the game with a converted try by Eric Lewis.

The Whiticker/Collis reference quotes a rather prosaic Labor Daily in praise of both sides: “The ebb and flow of the grand final thrilled thousands who saw a great battle. A battle of the gladiators, fighting till their lungs seemed only fit to burst, while over 16,000 people hearts beating wildly to the thump of running feet, looked on gasping, cheering and rising from their seats in sheer delight”.

South Sydney 19 (Tries: Jack Why, Alby Black, Eric Lewis. Goals: Benny Wearing 4, Percy Williams)

Western Suburbs 12 (Tries: Alan Ridley, Harry Rankine. Goals: Les Mead 3)
