= 1930 NSWRFL season =

Rugby league competition

1930 New South Wales Rugby Football League
- Teams: 8
- Premiers: Western Suburbs (1st title)
- Minor premiers: Western Suburbs (1st title)
- Matches played: 60
- Points scored: 1721
- Top points scorer(s): Jim Craig (86)
- Wooden spoon: University (5th spoon)
- Top try-scorer(s): Morrie Boyle (15)

The 1930 New South Wales Rugby Football League premiership was the twenty-third season of Sydney's top-level rugby league competition, Australia's first. During the season, which lasted from April until October, eight teams from across the city contested the premiership which was won by Western Suburbs, who defeated St. George in the grand final.

== Season summary ==
In spite of the reduced number of clubs 1930 was the NSWRFL's most drawn out season. Because of representative fixtures and the need for a grand final, the season did not end until 4 October. The 1930 season was also the last in the NSWRFL for future Australian Rugby League Hall of Fame inductee, Jim Craig.

=== Teams ===
Foundation club Glebe was voted out of the competition by the New South Wales Rugby League General Committee at the end of 1929, thirteen votes to twelve. Glebe had come second-last or third-last with eight points excluding those from byes three seasons in a row, (Note: In 1928, Glebe played one fewer game than second-last placed Balmain, and gained two extra points over that club via an extra bye.) but although the club never won a first grade premiership, (Note: Glebe did win reserve grade premierships in 1912, 1918, 1919, 1920 and 1921, and the third grade premiership in 1927.) it also managed to avoid the wooden spoon every season during its existence. After the decision was made, many fans and local politicians rallied to reverse the decision but to no avail. One reason suggested as to why this occurred include the fact that Glebe was gradually shifting away from a residential to industrial centre, with the NSWRFL perhaps believing that there was no future for the game in the area.

As a result of Glebe's omission, the competition was reduced to eight teams for the first time since 1910, including six of the remaining nine foundation clubs.

- Balmain, formed on 23 January 1908 at Balmain Town Hall
- Eastern Suburbs, formed on 24 January 1908 at Paddington Town Hall
- Newtown, formed on 14 January 1908
- North Sydney, formed on 7 February 1908
- South Sydney, formed on 17 January 1908 at Redfern Town Hall
- St. George, formed on 8 November 1920 at Kogarah School of Arts
- Western Suburbs, formed on 4 February 1908
- University, formed in 1919 at Sydney University

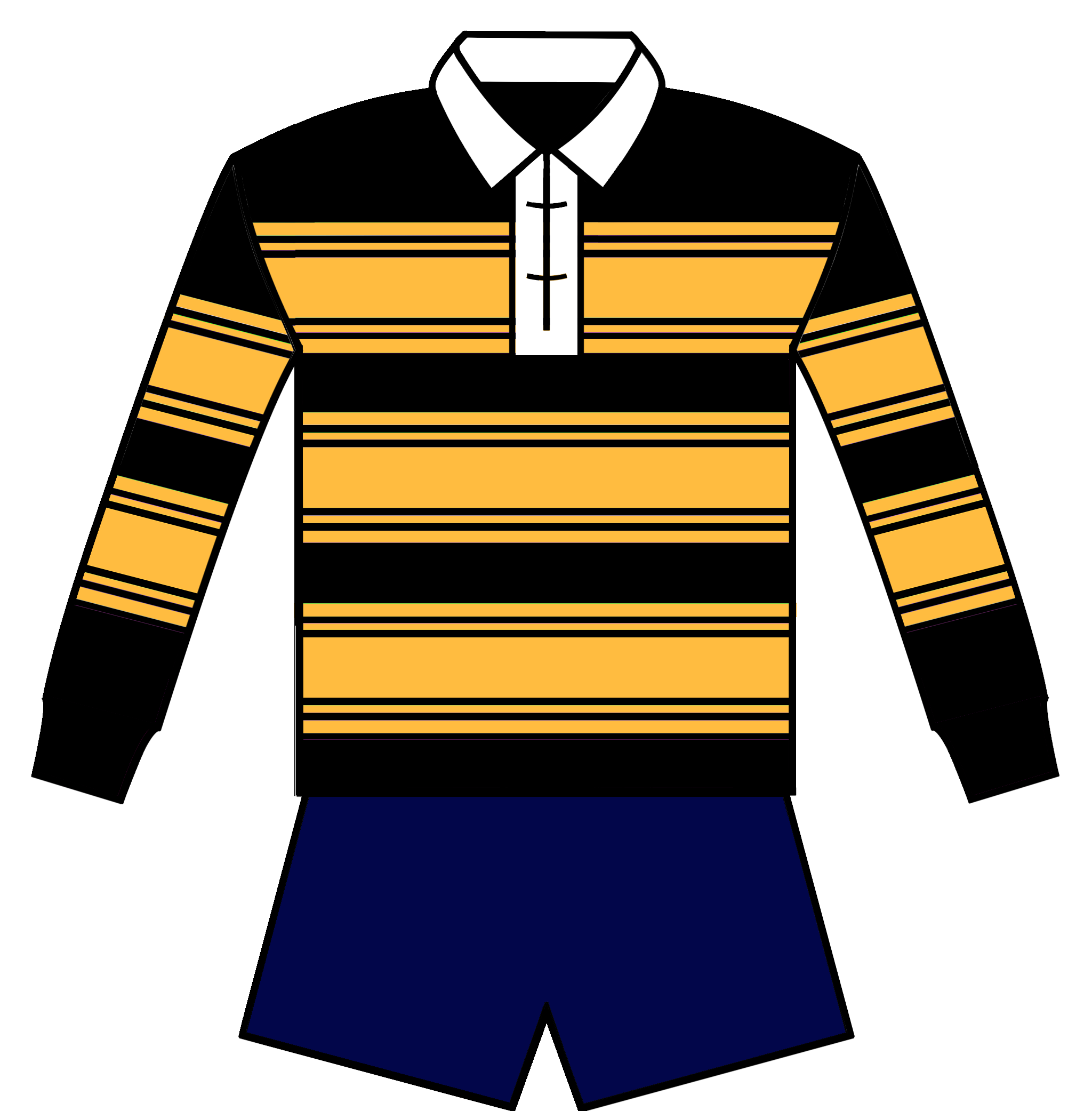
Balmain 23rd season Ground: Wentworth Park; Coach: Cec Fifield & Norman Robinson; Captain: Cec Fifield

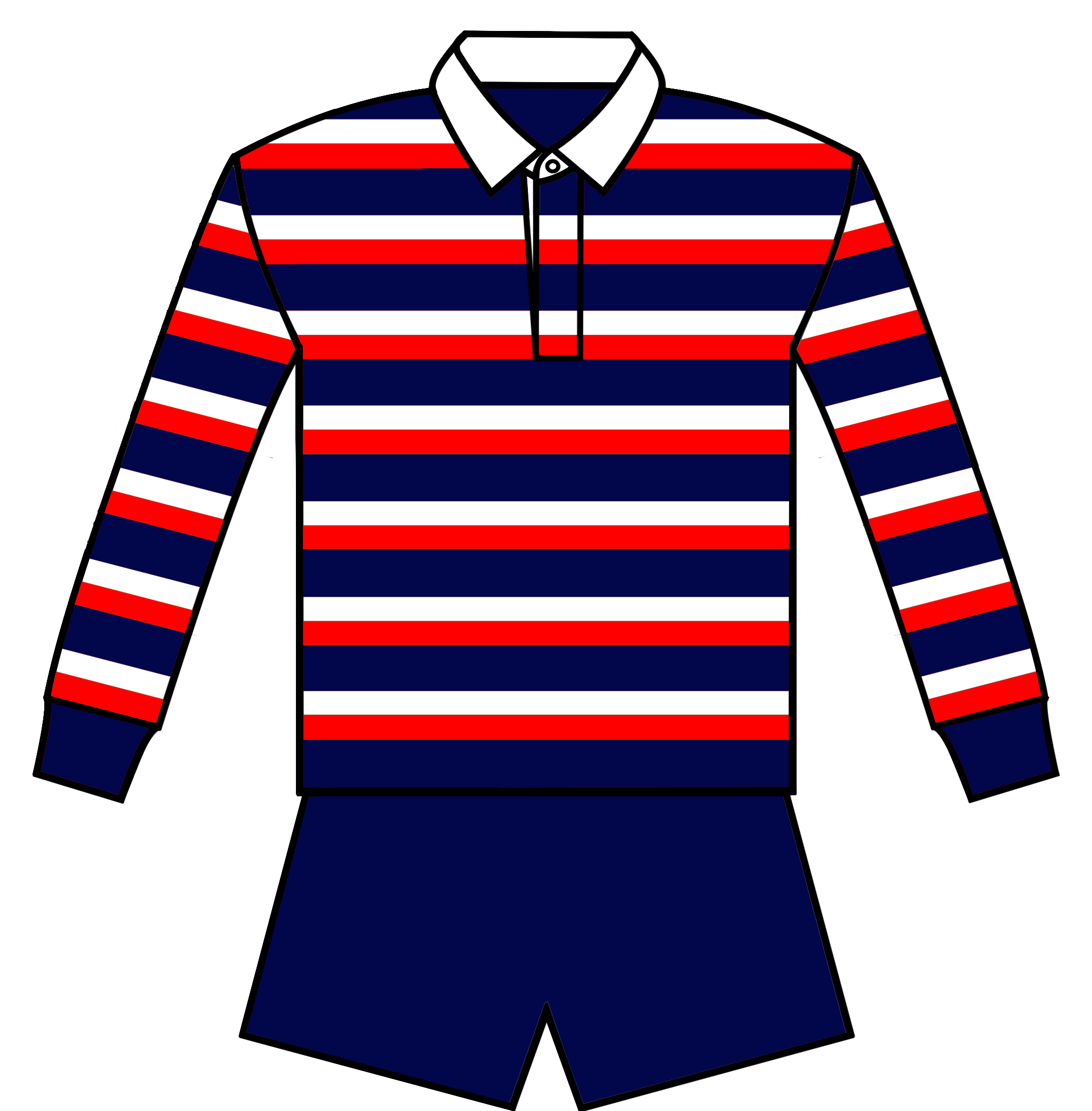
Eastern Suburbs 23rd season Ground: Sydney Sports Ground; Coach: Arthur Halloway; Captain: Joe Busch

Newtown 23rd season Ground: Marrickville Oval; Captain: Jack Holmes

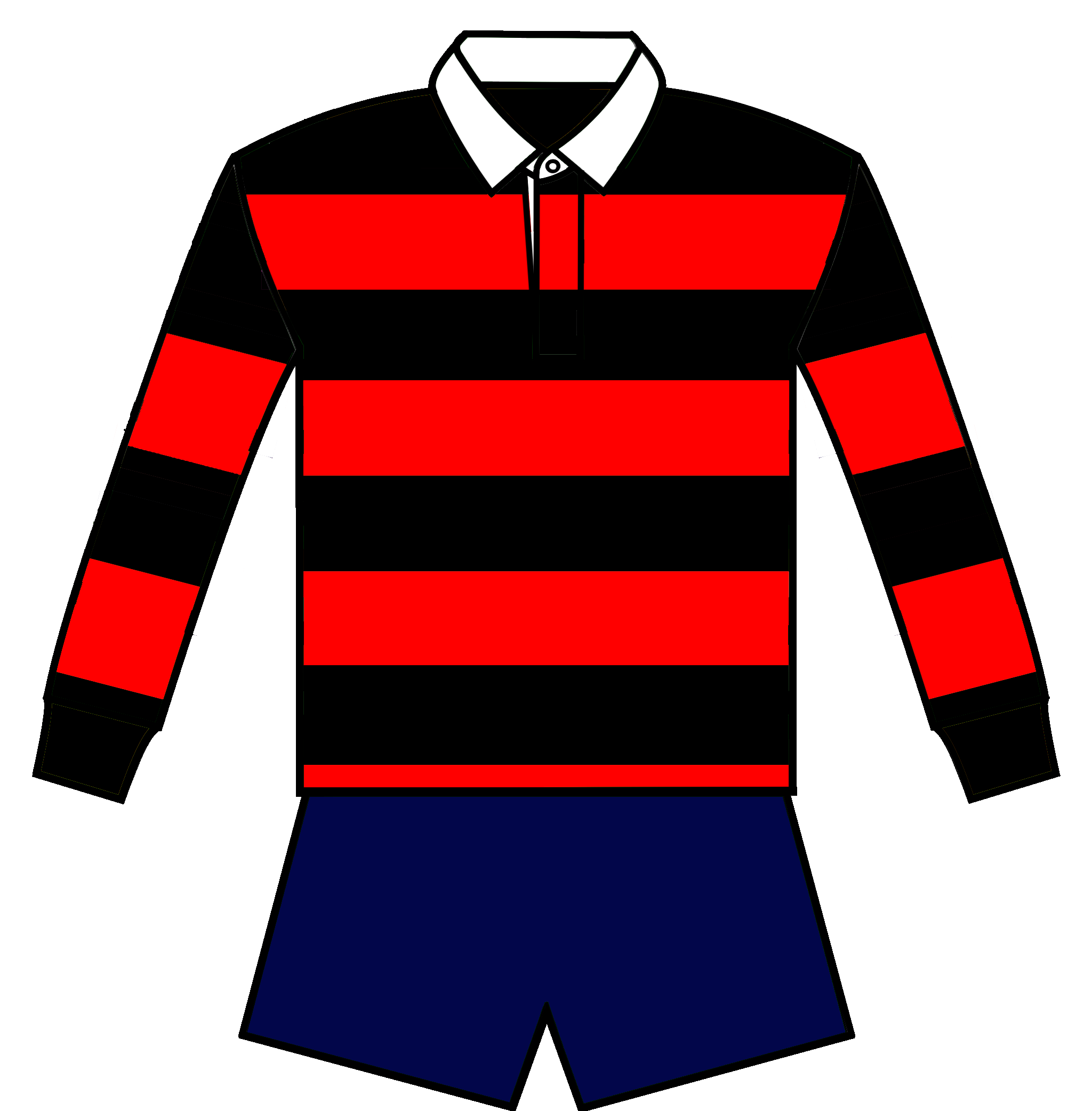
North Sydney 23rd season Ground: North Sydney Oval; Coach: Tedda Courtney; Captain: Les Carroll

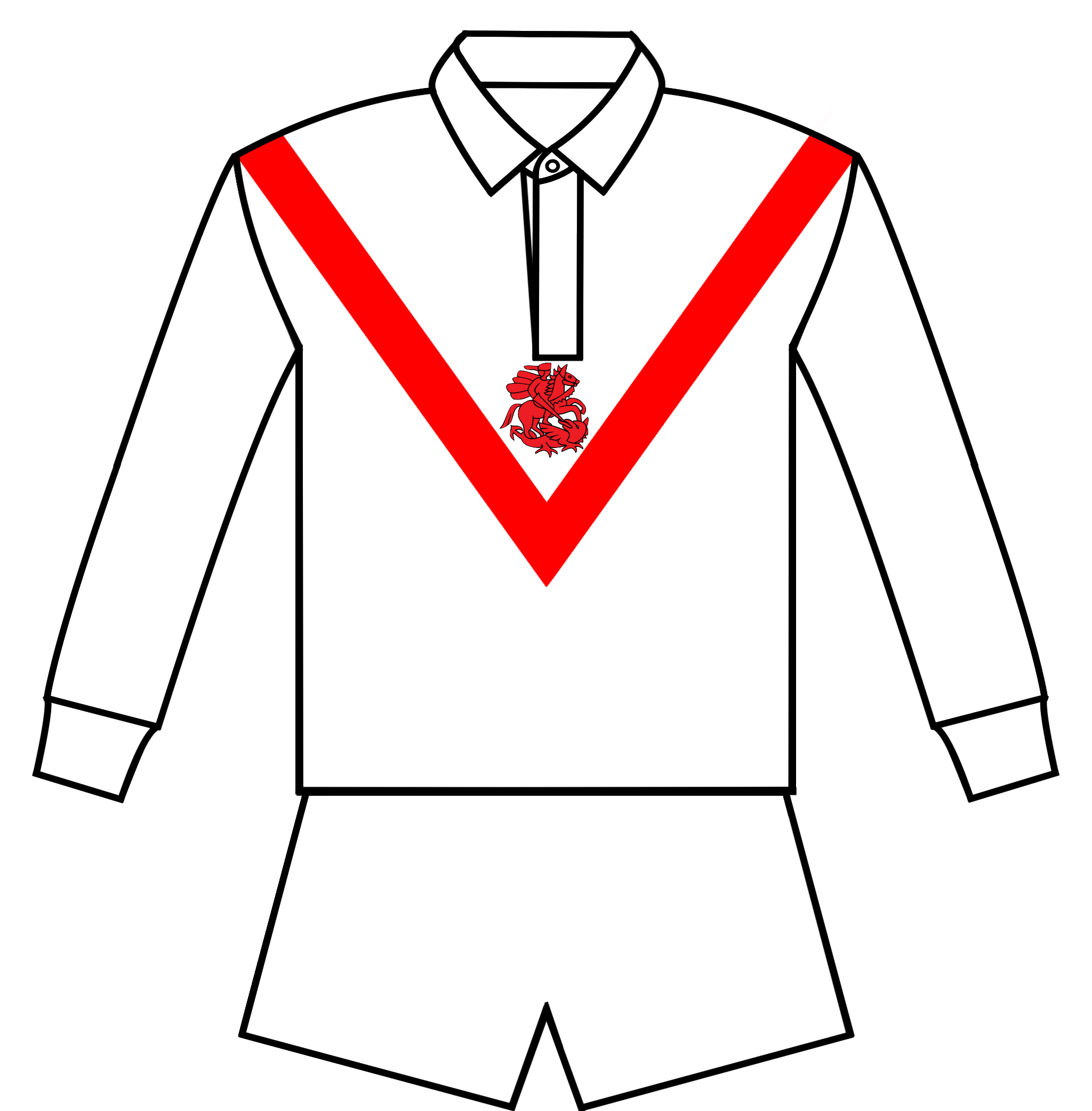
St. George 10th season Ground: Earl Park; Coach: Frank Burge; Captain: Arthur Justice

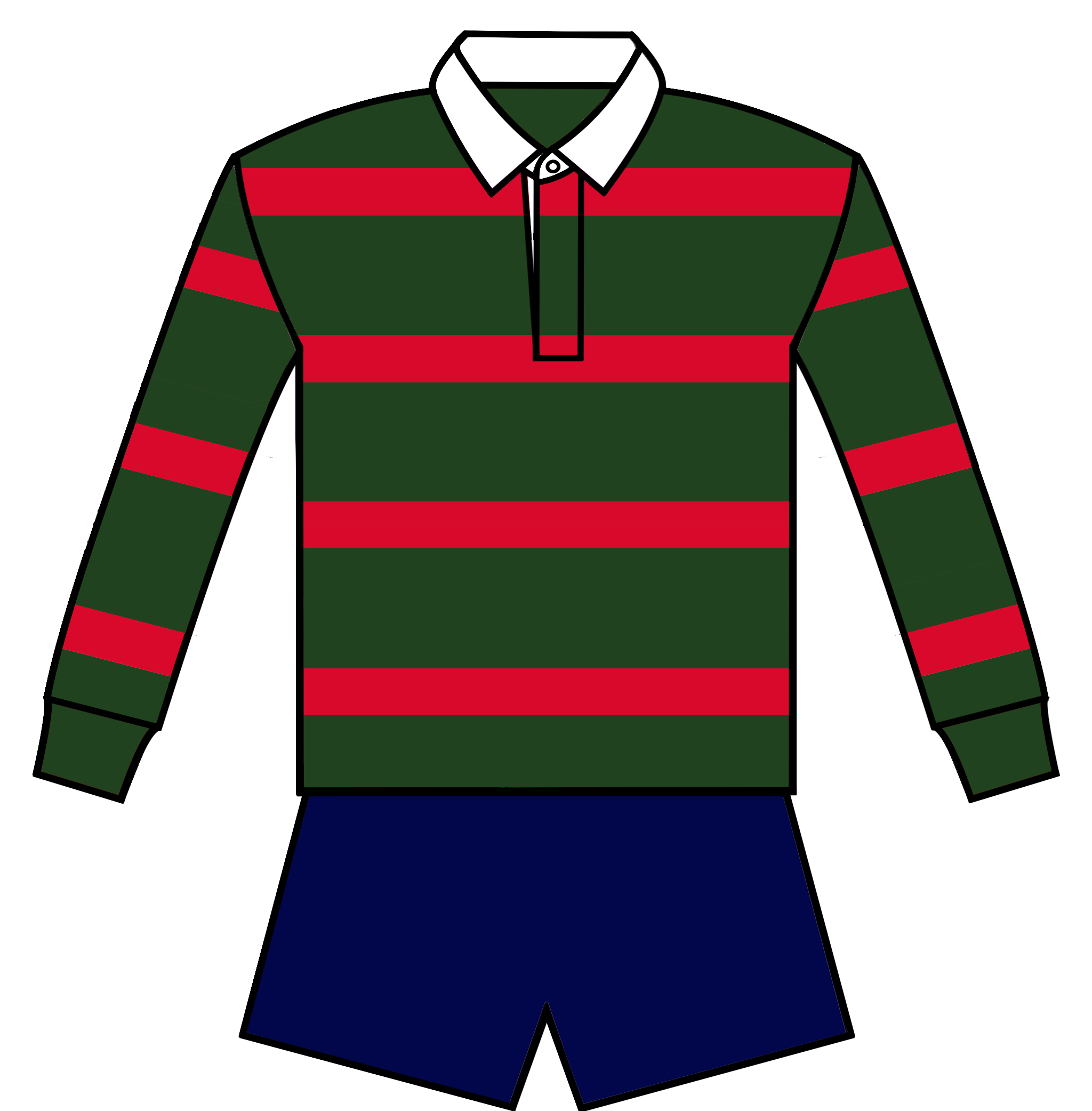
South Sydney 23rd season Ground: Sydney Sports Ground; Coach: Charlie Lynch; Captain: Alf Blair

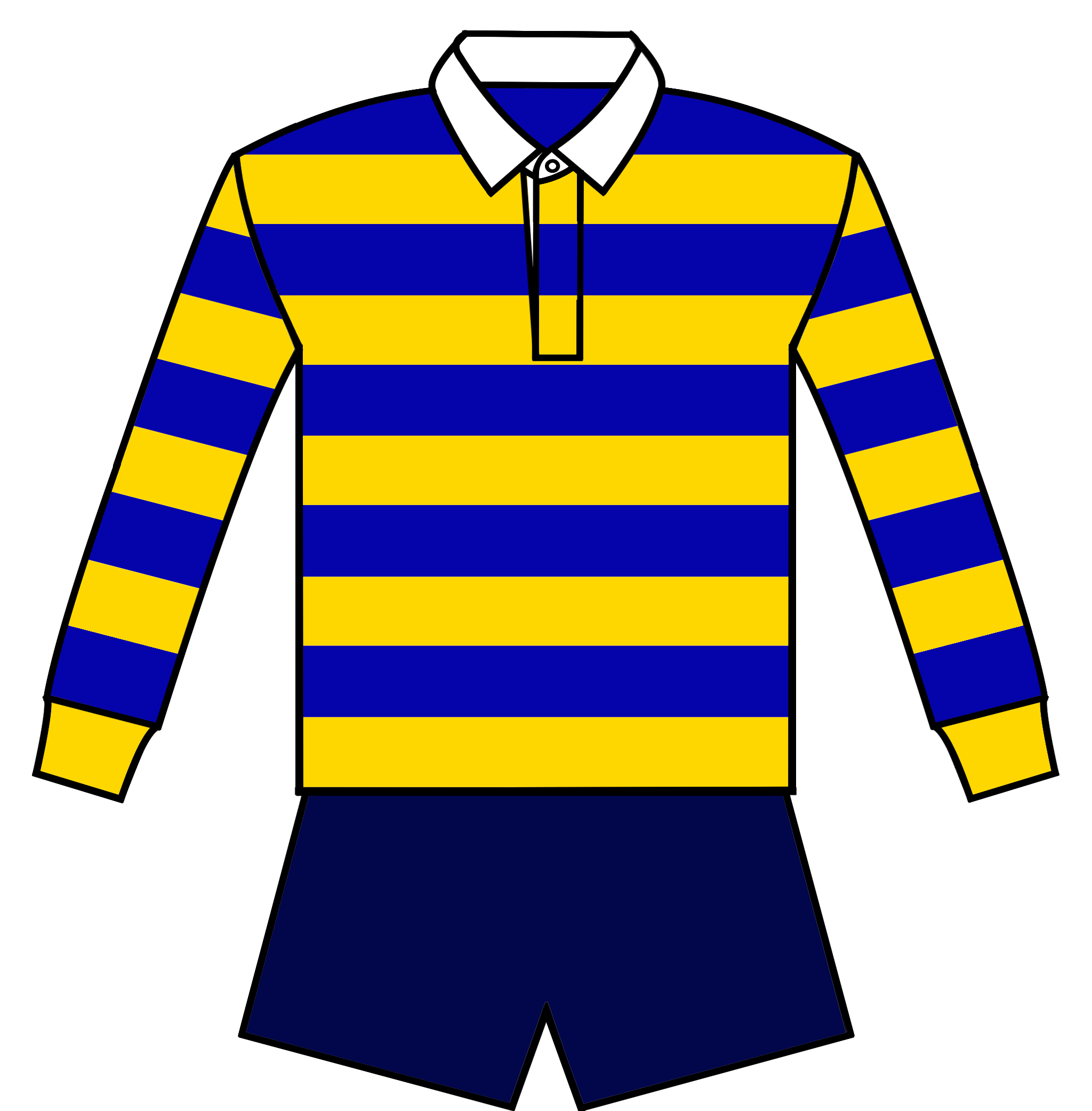
University 11th season Coach: Bill Kelly; Captain: Sammy Ogg

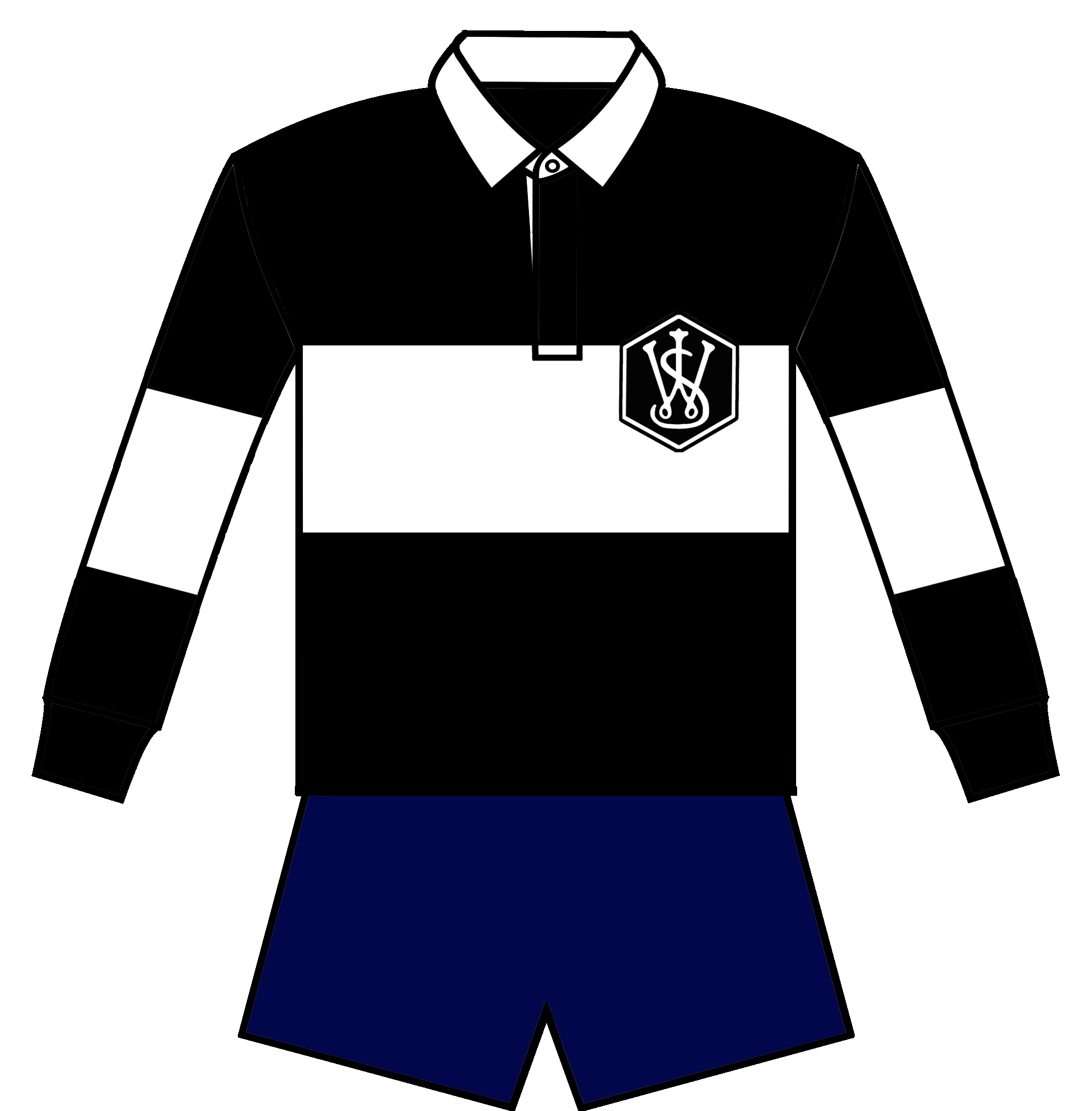
Western Suburbs 23rd season Ground: Pratten Park; Captain-Coach: Jim Craig

=== Ladder ===
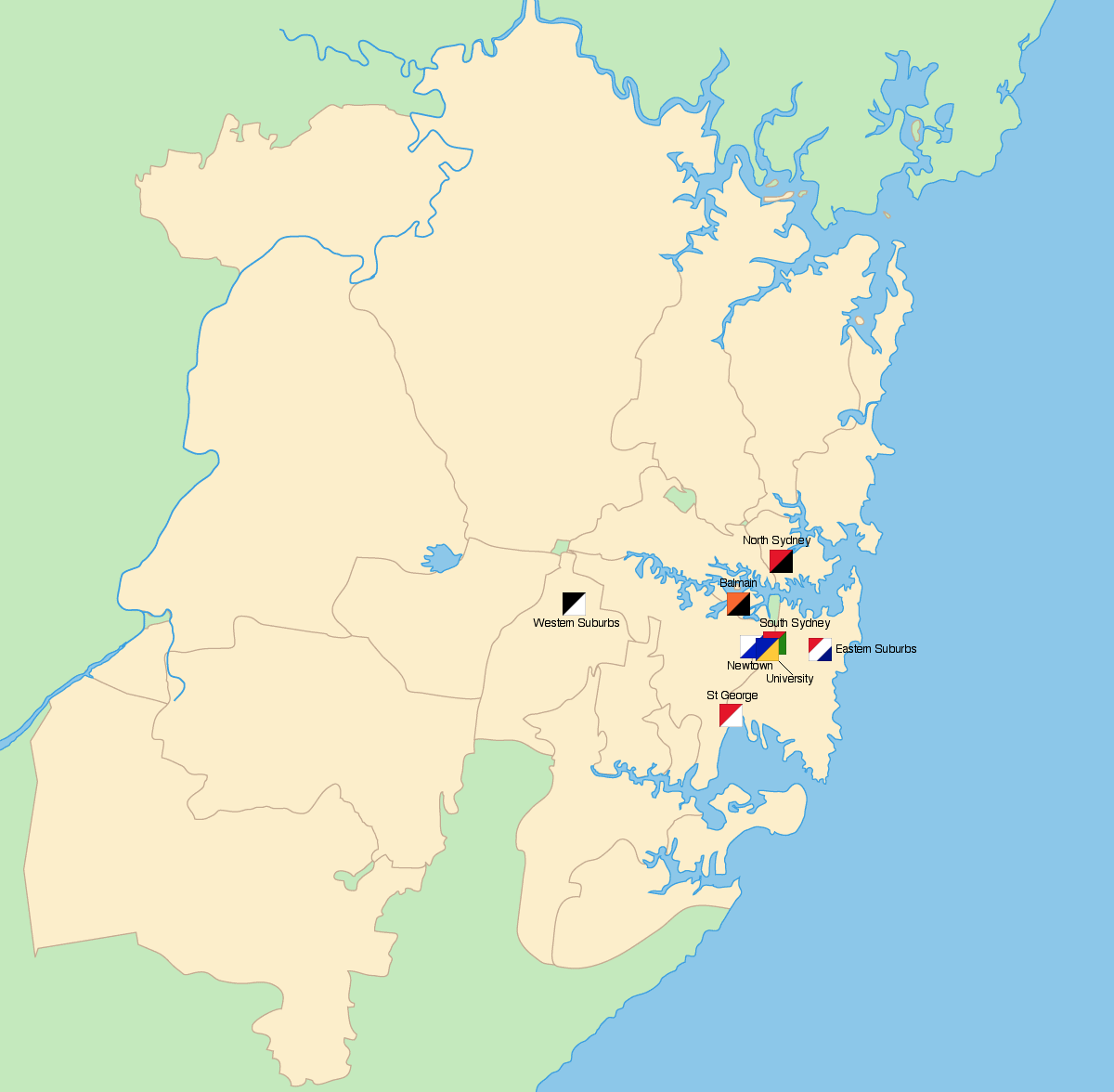
The geographical locations of the teams that contested the 1930 premiership across Sydney.

	Team	Pld	W	D	L	PF	PA	PD	Pts
1	Western Suburbs	14	12	0	2	237	130	+107	24
2	Eastern Suburbs	14	11	0	3	316	178	+138	22
3	South Sydney	14	9	0	5	234	174	+60	18
4	St. George	14	6	2	6	161	151	+10	14
5	Newtown	14	6	1	7	194	176	+18	13
6	Balmain	14	5	2	7	214	218	-4	12
7	North Sydney	14	2	1	11	164	289	-125	5
8	Sydney University	14	2	0	12	117	321	-204	4

== Finals ==
In the two semi finals, St. George beat second-placed Eastern Suburbs whilst minor premiers Western Suburbs beat defending premiers South Sydney. The two winners then played a final in which St. George upset Western Suburbs 14–6, as they previously did in Round 11.

St. George 1930 runners-up

The finals system set in place then forced the final to be replayed, in what was known as the "Right of Challenge". This system ensured that in the event that the minor premiers lost in either the first or second round of the finals, then regardless they would be given a second chance in a premiership decider. With this being the first season where the "Right of Challenge" was exercised, the 1930 decider was thus the first "grand final" played in the NSWRFL.

Semi-finals
20 September 1930 - Earl Park
Eastern Suburbs	10
St. George	11
20 September 1930 - Sports Ground
Western Suburbs	9
South Sydney	5

Final
27 September 1930 – Sports Ground
Western Suburbs	6
St. George	14

=== Final ===
Western Suburbs	Position	St. George
Frank McMillan	FB	Jack McCormack
Alan Brady	WG	Eric Freestone
Cliff Pearce	CE	Jack Lennox
Ken Sherwood	CE	Walter Greenlands
Ray Morris	WG	Bernie Martin
Jack Rosa	FE	Arnold Traynor
Jim Craig (Ca./Co.)	HB	Alf Sadler
Bill Brogan	PR	Harry Flower
Bob Lindfield	HK	Arthur Justice (c)
Cecil Rhodes	PR	Reg Schuman
Bill Carpenter	SR	Bill Hyland
Charlie Cornwell	SR	Jim Wearmouth
Frank Matterson	LK	Percy Fairall
	Coach	Frank Burge

Having pipped Eastern Suburbs 11–10 at their home ground of Earl Park on 20 September, Saints continued their good form into the following weekend in the final, defeating minor premiers Western Suburbs 14–6 in front of 16,557 people. The two teams had met twice before during the season with Wests winning the first encounter in May and St. George winning the second match in August. Under the previous system, victory in the final would have seen St. George declared premiership champions. However, in 1930, Wests were allowed a second chance as minor premiers if defeated during the finals.

=== Grand final ===
The re-match decider was played in front of 12,178 people on 4 October at the Sydney Sports Ground and officiated by referee Lal Deane. St. George led 2–0 early and competed in the first half. However, Western Suburbs were a crack outfit and after Saints lost veteran forward, Harry Flower with an arm injury, they skipped away to a 16–2 lead. Wests eventually ran in seven tries and crushed St. George 27–2 to take away their first ever NSWRFL premiership in any grade, although they were one of the foundation clubs in 1908.

It was the final game as a player for Wests’ captain-coach and versatile representative star Jim Craig.

Western Suburbs 27 (Tries: Alan Brady 3, Jim Craig, Charlie Cornwell, Ray Morris, Cecil Rhodes. Goals: Jim Craig 2, Bill Brogan)

St. George 2 (Goals: Bill Hyland)

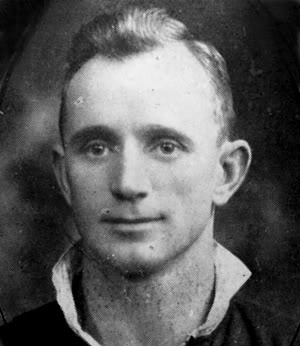
Frank McMillan

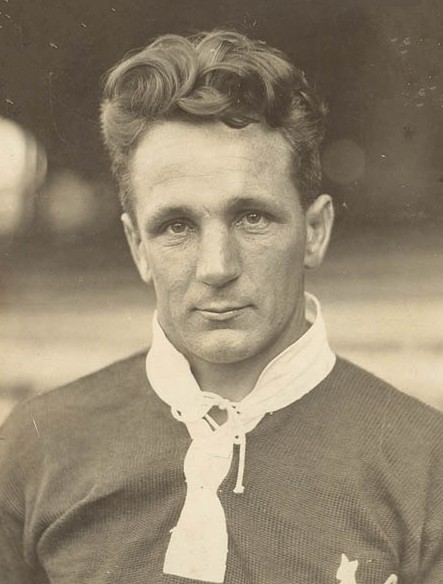
Jim Craig

Arthur Justice
