= Jack Lennox =

Australian rugby league footballer

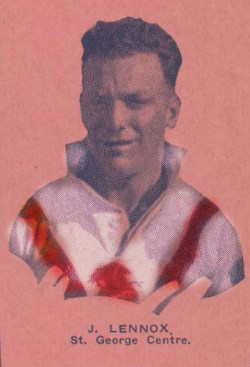
- Jack Lennox 1931

Personal information
- Full name: John Patrick Lennox
- Born: 21 March 1907 Mudgee, New South Wales, Australia
- Died: 7 December 1943 (aged 36) Siam

Playing information
- Position: Centre
Club
Years	Team	Pld	T	G	FG	P
1930–32	St. George	40	3	0	0	9
1933–34	South Sydney	15	1	0	0	3
	Total	55	4	0	0	12
- Military career
- Allegiance: Australia
- Branch: Australian Army
- Service years: 1941-43
- Rank: Gunner
- Unit: 2/15th Field Regiment
- Conflicts: World War II; Fall of Singapore

John Patrick Lennox (21 March 1907 – 7 December 1943) was an Australian World War II serviceman and prisoner of war. He had played rugby league in the New South Wales premiership competition with St. George and South Sydney in the 1930s.

== Background ==
Lennox was born in Mudgee, New South Wales on 21 March 1907.

== Career ==
Lennox started his first grade career with St. George in 1930. He made an appearance with the side in Game 1 of the 1930 Country Carnival. He scored a try, helping his team defeat North Coast 21–9.

He made his debut with the team in a round 5 in a 10–7 win over North Sydney. He scored his debut try against Western Suburbs in round 11, helping St. George win 19–9. Two rounds later, he scored his second career try in a win over South Sydney. Lennox played in St. George's 14–6 win against Wests in the 1930 grand final. Wests however, were allowed a grand final challenge, and defeated St. George 27–2 to win the premiership.

In round 14 of the 1931 season, Lennox scored a try in a loss to Newtown.

Lennox made 14 appearances in the 1932 season. St. George failed to qualify for the finals, finishing the season sixth.

In 1933, Lennox signed with South Sydney. He made his debut with the club in the opening round of the 1933 season against Newtown. He played 6 games that year, playing primarily as a lock.

Lennox was reverted to centre for the 1934 season. He scored a try against Balmain in round 7. His final game of his career was in a 7–18 round 10 loss to his former club St. George.

== War service and death ==
Jack Lennox enlisted in the Australian Army in 1941 to fight in World War II. He was a gunner in the 2/15th Field Regiment (Australia). The 2/15th regiment defended Singapore in 1941, were pushed back to the city and were captured by Japanese forces at the Fall of Singapore. Jack Lennox was made a prisoner of war of the Japanese, and died in a prison camp on 7 December 1943. He is listed on the Roll of Honor in his home town of Mudgee, New South Wales.
