= Cecil Rhodes (rugby league) =

Australian rugby league footballer

Personal information
- Full name: Cecil Arthur Rhodes
- Born: 16 April 1901 Burwood, New South Wales, Australia
- Died: 11 November 1966 (aged 65) Petersham, New South Wales, Australia

Playing information
- Position: Prop
Club
Years	Team	Pld	T	G	FG	P
1926–33	Western Suburbs	79	14	0	0	42
- Source: As of 18 June 2019

Cecil Arthur 'Johnno' Rhodes (1901-1966) was an Australian rugby league footballer who played in the 1920s and 1930s.

== Playing career ==
'Johnno' Rhodes played for Western Suburbs for six seasons between 1928 and 1933. He is remembered as a member of the winning premiership team of 1930 which was the club's first premiership and playing in the team that were runners up in 1932.

== Death ==
Rhodes died on 11 November 1966 at Petersham, New South Wales.
