= Ces Hyland =

Australian rugby league footballer (1904–1977)

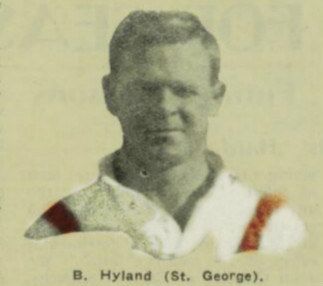
- Blue Hyland 1930

Personal information
- Full name: Cecil Isaac Cooper Hyland
- Born: 5 February 1904 Moree, New South Wales, Australia
- Died: 11 May 1977 (aged 73)

Playing information
- Position: Prop
Club
Years	Team	Pld	T	G	FG	P
1930–33	St. George	46	4	48	0	108

Cecil Isaac Cooper Hyland (1904–1977), also known as "Blue" Hyland, was an Australian rugby league player who played in the 1930s.

== Career ==
Hyland seated 2nd row, 3rd from right in Saints' 1930 side

Hyland came to St. George from Mudgee, New South Wales in 1930. He played four seasons with the club between 1930 and 1933, and played in the 1930 Grand Final. He was also known as "Blue" or Charlie.
