= Reg Schuman =

Australian rugby league footballer

Personal information
- Full name: Reginald Charles Austin Schuman
- Born: 1908 Hurstville, New South Wales, Australia
- Died: 2 March 1974 (aged 65) Arncliffe, New South Wales, Australia

Playing information
- Position: Second-row, Lock, Prop
Club
Years	Team	Pld	T	G	FG	P
1929–35	St. George	60	3	0	0	9

Reginald Charles Austin Schuman (1908–1974) was an Australian rugby league player who played in the 1920s and 1930s.

== Playing career ==
An Arncliffe Scots junior, Schuman played seven seasons for St. George between 1929 and 1935. He is remembered as playing prop in the 1930 Grand Final in which St. George were defeated by Western Suburbs 27–2.

== Death ==
Schuman died in Sydney on 2 March 1974, aged 65.

Schuman 2nd back row, 4th from right in Saints' 1930 side
