= Jim Wearmouth =

Australian rugby league footballer

- Jim Wearmouth 1929

Personal information
- Full name: James Leslie Wearmouth
- Born: 4 September 1909 Marrickville, New South Wales, Australia
- Died: 20 September 1989 (aged 80) Sydney, New South Wales, Australia

Playing information
- Position: Second-row, Five-eighth
Club
| Years | Team | Pld | T | G | FG | P |
|---|---|---|---|---|---|---|
| 1929–31 | St George Dragons | 29 | 7 | 0 | 0 | 21 |

James Leslie Wearmouth (1909–1989) was an Australian rugby league footballer who played in the 1930s.

Jim 'Bluey' Wearmouth played three first grade seasons with St George Dragons between 1929 and 1931. He played second row for the Saints in the 1930 Grand Final and retired the following year. By 1933, Jim Wearmouth was playing local A Grade for the Brighton Seagulls before retiring.

Jim Wearmouth died on 20 September 1989, aged 80.

Wearmouth seated 2nd from right in Saints' 1930 side
