= Eric Freestone =

Australia international rugby league player (1904–1957)

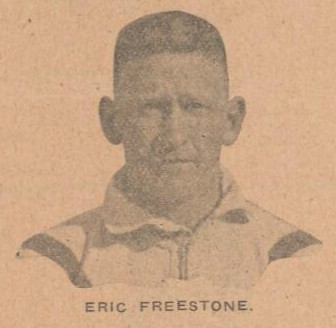
- Eric Freestone

Personal information
- Full name: Eric Vivian Freestone
- Born: 9 February 1904 Gundagai, New South Wales, Australia
- Died: 12 October 1957 (aged 53) Villawood, New South Wales, Australia

Playing information
- Position: Wing
Club
Years	Team	Pld	T	G	FG	P
1929–32	St. George	48	16	32	0	112
Representative
Years	Team	Pld	T	G	FG	P
1928	New South Wales	4	3	5	0	19
1928	Australia	1	0	1	0	2
1928	NSW Country	1	1	0	0	3

Eric Vivian Freestone (9 February 1904–12 October 1957) was an Australian rugby league player who played in the 1920s and 1930s. He was a state and national representative winger

== Career ==
Born in Gundagai, New South Wales Eric 'Bluey' Freestone played four seasons with St. George between 1929 and 1932. He came to St. George from Gundagai, New South Wales after already representing New South Wales and Australia in the first test against the touring 1928 English team in Brisbane.

Freestone is listed on the Australian Players Register as Kangaroo No. 137. Freestone played in the 1930 Grand Final for St. George.

== Death ==
Freestone died on 12 October 1957, at age 53.

Freestone back row 2nd from right in Saints' 1930 side
