= Walter Greenlands =

Australian rugby league footballer

- Walter Greenlands 1930

Personal information
- Full name: Walter John Greenlands
- Born: 15 December 1899; Wollongong, New South Wales, Australia
- Died: 23 February 1958 (aged 58); Corrimal, New South Wales, Australia

Playing information
- Position: Centre
Club
Years	Team	Pld	T	G	FG	P
1929–30	St. George	24	2	0	0	6

Walter John Greenlands (1899–1958) was an Australian rugby league player who played in the 1920s and 1930s.

== Playing career ==
Greenlands played two seasons for St. George between 1929 and 1930. The highlight of his career was when he played in St George's 1930 Grand Final loss to Western Suburbs.

== Death ==
Greenlands died in Corrimal, New South Wales on 23 February 1958, aged 58.

Greenlands 2nd back row, 2nd from left in Saints' 1930 side
