= Jack Rosa =

Australian rugby league footballer (1905-1967)

Personal information
- Full name: John Rosa
- Born: 14 April 1905 Riverstone, New South Wales, Australia
- Died: 14 July 1967 (aged 62) Merrylands, New South Wales, Australia

Playing information
- Position: Five-eighth, Lock, Halfback
Club
Years	Team	Pld	T	G	FG	P
1930–31	Western Suburbs	15	4	0	0	12
- Source: As of 17 June 2019

John Rosa (1905–1967) was an Australian rugby league footballer who played in the 1930s.

== Playing career ==
He was a premiership winning five-eighth for the Western Suburbs. He played two seasons of first grade between 1930 and 1931, which included winning the 1930 Grand Final.

== Death ==
Rosa died at Merrylands, New South Wales on 14 July 1967.
