= Charlie Cornwell =

Australian rugby league footballer

Personal information
- Full name: Charlie Cornwell
- Born: 1906; Ararat, Victoria
- Died: 2 Jun 1964 (aged 57–58); Burwood, New South Wales

Playing information
- Position: Second-row
Club
Years	Team	Pld	T	G	FG	P
1930–34	Western Suburbs	72	25	38	0	151
Representative
Years	Team	Pld	T	G	FG	P
1930–34	New South Wales	7	5	2	0	19

Charlie Cornwell (1906-1964) was an Australian rugby league footballer who played in the 1930s. He played for Western Suburbs in the NSWRL competition, as a second-row.

== Playing career ==
Cornwell made his first grade debut for Western Suburbs in Round 4 of the 1930 season against St George. That same year, Cornwell was a member of the Western Suburbs side which claimed their first ever premiership defeating St George 27–2 in the grand final challenge. Wests had lost the original grand final but as minor premiers were allowed to challenge the winner for a rematch. In 1931, Cornwell played in the 1931 grand final which Wests lost 17–3 to South Sydney. The following year in 1932, Wests suffered a similar fate losing to Souths again in the 1932 grand final challenge 9–2. In 1933, Cornwell and Wests endured a poor season finishing last on the table but the following year in 1934 they went from wooden spooners to premiers defeating Eastern Suburbs 15–12 in the grand final, a feat that no team as of 2018 has matched since. This would prove to be Cornwell's last game for Western Suburbs as he retired at the end of that year. Cornwell also represented New South Wales on seven occasions.
