= Ken Sherwood (rugby league) =

Australian rugby league footballer (1902-1988)

Personal information
- Full name: Frank Knyvet Sherwood
- Born: 26 April 1902 Ashfield, New South Wales, Australia
- Died: 7 March 1988 (aged 85)

Playing information
- Position: Centre, Wing
Club
Years	Team	Pld	T	G	FG	P
1927–32	Western Suburbs	69	19	5	0	67
1933	North Sydney	5	1	0	0	3
	Total	74	20	5	0	70
Representative
Years	Team	Pld	T	G	FG	P
1931	New South Wales	4	1	0	0	3

Frank Knyvet Sherwood, nickname 'Sherry', was an Australian Rugby League player footballer who played in the 1920s and 1930s. He played for Western Suburbs and North Sydney in the NSWRL competition. His position was either centre or on the wing.

== Playing career ==
Sherwood made his debut for Western Suburbs in 1927 against Glebe at the Sydney Cricket Ground in a 12–4 win. In 1930, Sherwood was a member of the Western Suburbs side which won the minor premiership and reached the grand final against St George. St George won the grand final 14-6 but due to the rules at the time, the minor premiers were allowed to challenge for a rematch. Western Suburbs won the grand final rematch in convincing fashion 27-2 and claimed its first premiership with Sherwood playing at centre in the match. Sherwood played two more seasons with Wests before moving across the harbor to North Sydney in 1933 making 5 appearances that season before retiring. Sherwood also represented New South Wales on four occasions in 1931.
