= Bill Carpenter (rugby league) =

Australian rugby league footballer (1903-1976)

Personal information
- Full name: William McIntyre Carpenter
- Born: 25 April 1903 Quirindi, New South Wales, Australia
- Died: 15 September 1976 (aged 73)

Playing information
- Position: Second-row
Club
Years	Team	Pld	T	G	FG	P
1923–32	Western Suburbs	59	5	0	0	15

William McIntyre Carpenter was an Australian rugby league footballer who played in the 1920s and 1930s. He played for Western Suburbs and in the New South Wales Rugby League (NSWRL) competition, as a second-row.

== Playing career ==
Carpenter made his debut for Western Suburbs in 1923 against Glebe at Pratten Park. In 1929, Carpenter was a member of the Wests side which reached the preliminary final before losing to South Sydney. In 1930, Carpenter played 14 games for Wests as the club won the minor premiership but were defeated in the grand final against St. George. Carpenter played two more seasons for Wests, and retired at the end of 1932.
