= Bob Lindfield =

Australian rugby league footballer (1901-1959)

Personal information
- Full name: Robert Jesse Lindfield
- Born: 9 June 1901 Orange, New South Wales, Australia
- Died: 9 September 1959 (aged 58) Orange, New South Wales, Australia

Playing information
- Position: Hooker, Second-row
Club
Years	Team	Pld	T	G	FG	P
1923–34	Western Suburbs	137	13	0	0	0
1935–36	Canterbury-Bankstown	16	0	0	0	0
	Total	153	13	0	0	0
Representative
Years	Team	Pld	T	G	FG	P
1928	New South Wales	5	2	0	0	6
1927	Metropolis	1	0	0	0	0
1928	NSW City	1	0	0	0	0
1922–25	NSW Country	2	0	0	0	0

Robert Jesse Lindfield (1901–1959) was an Australian rugby league footballer who played in the 1920s and 1930s.

== Background ==
Lindfield was born in Orange, New South Wales on 9 June 1901.

== Playing career ==
Lindfield came to Western Suburbs in 1923. He played eleven seasons for Wests between 1923 and 1934. He played hooker in two premiership winning teams: 1930 and 1934.

He shifted to Canterbury-Bankstown for two seasons between 1935 and 1936 before retiring. Budgen played in Canterbury's first ever game as a club in Round 1 1935 against North Sydney at North Sydney Oval which ended in a 20–5 loss.

Lindfield represented New South Wales on five occasions in 1928.

== Death ==
Lindfield died on 9 September 1959, aged 58.
