= Alby Black =

Australian rugby league player

Personal information
- Full name: Albert Ernest Black
- Born: 29 October 1908
- Died: 27 November 1984 (aged 76)

Playing information
- Position: Centre, Halfback, Wing
Club
Years	Team	Pld	T	G	FG	P
1928–29	Glebe	18	3	0	0	9
1930–31	Balmain	24	11	0	0	33
1932–33	South Sydney	10	4	0	0	12
	Total	52	18	0	0	54
Representative
Years	Team	Pld	T	G	FG	P
1930	New South Wales	1	0	0	0	0
1930	Metropolis	1	1	0	0	3

Alby Black was an Australian rugby league footballer who played in the 1920s and 1930s. He played for Glebe, Balmain and South Sydney. He played in a number of positions including halfback, centre and wing.

== Playing career ==
Black began his first grade career with Glebe and made his debut for the club in Round 5 of the 1928 season. Black played for Glebe at a time when the clubs fortune started to decline and he was a member of the Glebe side who played their last ever game as a first grade side against North Sydney which finished in a 24–24 draw at North Sydney Oval. After Glebe were controversially voted out of the NSWRL premiership, Black joined Glebe's rivals Balmain where he spent two seasons. In 1932, Black joined Souths and in his first season at the club was a member of the side which defeated Western Suburbs 19–12 in the grand final with Black scoring a try. Black played one more season for Souths in 1933 and then retired.
