= Bowen (surname) =

- Pronunciation: /ˈboʊ.ən/

Origin
- Region of origin: Wales; Ireland

Other names
- Variant forms: Bohan, Bohen, Bowan, Bowane, Bowene, Bowens, Bown, Bowne, Bowin, Eugene, Ewen (Eoghan), Owen (Owain), Owens

Bowen is a Celtic surname representing two separate Celtic ethnicities, the Welsh ab Owain meaning "son of Owen" (Owen meaning 'noble') and the Irish Ó Buadhacháin meaning "descendant of Bohan" (Bohan meaning 'victorious'). The Bowen lineage can be traced back to Llwyngwair in the 11th century, near Nevern in Pembrokeshire. The Bowen surname was adopted in 1424. There are seven Bowen crests and the Bowen/Owen family group share a tartan. The Bowen/Bowens surnames are more commonly found in southern Wales, while the Owen/Owens surnames are more commonly found in northern Wales.

This is a list of notable people born with the last name Bowen and people who married into the Bowen family.

- Adam Bowen, American billionaire businessman, co-founder of Juul
- Sir Albert Bowen, 1st Baronet (1858–1924), British-Argentinian businessman
- Albert E. Bowen (1875–1953), American member of the Church of Jesus Christ of Latter-day Saints
- Alex Bowen (skier) (born 1991), American freestyle skier
- Alex Bowen (water polo) (born 1993), American water polo player
- Andrea Bowen (born 1990), American actress and singer
- Andy Bowen (1867–1894), American boxer
- Anthony Bowen (1809–1872) African-American civic leader
- Arthur "Waring" Bowen (1922–1980), solicitor who founded the charity British Rheumatism & Arthritis Association
- Ashley Bowen (1728–1813), American sailor and writer
- Bart Bowen (born 1967), American cyclist
- Ben Bowen (2002–2005), American child who died from cancer
- Ben Bowen (musician) (born 1976), Canadian children's musician
- Benjamin John Bowen (1915–2009), Welsh rugby player
- Bill Bowen (1929–1999), African-American Ohio state senator
- Billy Bowen (1897–1960), Welsh rugby union and rugby league footballer of the 1920s
- Branden Bowen (born 1996), American football player
- Brian Bowen (born 1998), African-American college basketball player
- Bruce Bowen (born 1971), African-American basketball player
- Caroline Bowen (born 1944), Australian speech therapist
- Catherine Drinker Bowen (1897–1973), American author and historian
- Charles Bowen, Baron Bowen (1835–1894), English judge
- Charles Bowen (New Zealand politician) (1830–1917)
- Charles Bowen (Ontario politician) (1923–1992), mayor of Brantford
- Charles W. Bowen, Master Chief Petty Officer of the Coast Guard
- Chris Bowen (born 1973), Australian politician
- Christopher Bowen (born 1959), British actor
- Christopher C. Bowen (1832–1880), South Carolina Congressman
- Claire McKay Bowen, American statistician
- Cliff Bowen (1875–1929), Welsh rugby player and cricketer
- Collin Bowen (1919–2011), Welsh archaeologist and landscape historian
- Curtis Bowen (born 1974), Canadian ice hockey player
- Daniel Bowen (born 1970), Australian blogger
- Dave Bowen (1928–1995), Welsh football (soccer) player
- Dave Bowen (Australian footballer) (1886–1946), Australian rules footballer
- David Bowen (cricketer) (born 1971), English cricketer
- David Bowen, Felinfoel (1774–1853), Welsh Baptist minister
- David Bowen (pathologist) (1924–2011), Welsh pathologist
- David Bowen (Wisconsin politician) (born 1987), member of the Wisconsin State Assembly
- David Glyn Bowen (1933–2000), Welsh Congregationalist minister and missionary
- David James Bowen (1925–2017), Welsh scholar
- David John Bowen (1891–1912), Welsh boxer
- David R. Bowen (born 1932), Congressman for Mississippi
- Dayna Bowen Matthew (born Dayna Bowen, fl. 1980s–2020s), American law school dean
- Denis Bowen (1921–2006), South African artist, gallery director and promoter
- Dennis Bowen (1950–2012), American character actor
- Devin Bowen (born 1972), American tennis player
- Diamantina Bowen (c. 1832–1893), wife of British colonial administrator George Bowen
- Drayk Bowen (born 2004), American football and baseball player
- Edmund Bowen (1898–1981), British chemist
- Edward Bowen (footballer, born 1858) (1858–1923), Druids F. C. and Wales footballer
- Edward Bowen (politician) (1780–1866), Irish lawyer and politician in Lower Canada
- Edward Bowen (priest) (1828–1897), Anglican priest in Ireland
- Sir Edward Bowen, 2nd Baronet (1885–1937) of the Bowen Baronets
- Edward Ernest Bowen (1836–1901), Harrow schoolmaster
- Edward George Bowen (1911–1991), Welsh physicist
- Edward L. Bowen (1942–2025), American author of books on horse racing
- Eli Bowen (1844-1924), American sideshow performer
- Elizabeth Bowen (1899–1973), Irish novelist
- Emanuel Bowen (1694–1767), Welsh engraver
- Emma L. Bowen (1914–1996), community activist in community health care and fair media
- Emma Lucy Gates Bowen (1882–1951), American opera singer
- Ezra A. Bowen, Wisconsin state senator
- E. G. Bowen (1900–1983), Welsh geographer
- E. N. Bowen (1893–1959), American judge, lawyer and Illinois politician
- Francis Bowen (1811–1890), American philosophical writer and educationalist
- Gail Bowen (1944–2026), Canadian mystery writer, playwright and educator
- Geoffrey Bowen, Captain in the Battle of Wau
- Sir George Bowen (1821–1899), British colonial administrator
- George Bowen (colonial settler) (1803–1889), military officer and settler of New South Wales
- George Bowen (footballer) (1875–1945), English soccer player
- George Bowen (missionary) (1816–1888), American missionary in India
- George Bowen (New York politician) (1831–1921), New York state senator
- George Bowen (rugby union) (1863–1919), Welsh international rugby union half back
- George Bevan Bowen (1858–1940), Welsh Conservative landowner and county officer
- Sir George Edward Michael Bowen, 6th Baronet (born 1987) of the Bowen baronets
- Geraint Bowen (musician) (born 1963), director of the Hereford Three Choirs Festival
- Geraint Bowen (poet) (1915–2011), Welsh language poet and Archdruid of the Eisteddfod
- Harold G. Bowen Sr. (1883–1965), United States Navy admiral
- Harold L. Bowen (1886–1967), bishop of the Episcopal Diocese of Colorado
- Harry Bowen (rugby) (1864–1913), Welsh rugby player
- Harry Bowen (actor) (1888–1941), American character actor
- Henry Bowen (1841–1915), Virginia lawyer, soldier and Congressman
- Henry Chandler Bowen (1813–1896), American businessman
- Herbert Wolcott Bowen (1856–1927), American poet and diplomat
- Hilda Bowen (1923–2002), Bahamian nurse
- Howard Bowen (1908–1989), American economist and college president
- Humphry Bowen (1929–2001), British botanist and chemist
- Ira Sprague Bowen (1898–1973), American astronomer
- James Bowen (artist) (died 1774), English painter and topographer
- James Bowen (Royal Navy officer) (1751–1838)
- James Barton Bowen (1815–1881), mayor of Madison, Wisconsin
- James Bevan Bowen (MP) (1828–1905), British MP for Pembrokeshire
- James Bevan Bowen (RAF officer) (1883–1969)
- James Bowen (railroad executive) (1808–1886), president of Erie Railroad
- James Bowen (author) (born 1979), author of A Street Cat Named Bob
- James Bowen (footballer) (born 1996), English footballer
- James M. Bowen (1793–1880), first owner of "Mirador" residence in Greenwood, Virginia
- Jarrod Bowen (born 1996), English footballer
- Jason Bowen (footballer) (born 1972), Welsh former footballer
- Jason Bowen (ice hockey) (born 1973), retired Canadian ice hockey player
- Jeff Bowen (born 1971), American composer, lyricist and actor
- Jeffrey Bowen, African-American songwriter and music producer
- Jehdeiah Bowen (1817–1891), American politician
- Jenny Bowen (filmmaker), American screenwriter, director, and founder of OneSky
- Jeremy Bowen (born 1960), British journalist and television presenter
- Jimmy Bowen (born 1937), American record producer and pop musician
- Joe Bowen (born 1951), the voice of the Toronto Maple Leafs
- Sir John Edward Mortimer Bowen, 3rd Baronet (1918–1939) of the Bowen baronets
- John Bowen (alderman) (1844–1926), English businessman
- John Bowen (antiquary) (1756–1832), English painter, genealogist and antiquarian
- John Bowen (bishop) (1815–1859), bishop of Sierra Leone
- John Bowen (British author) (1924–2019), British playwright and novelist
- John Bowen (Royal Navy officer) (1780–1827), English sailor; founded Hobart
- John Bowen (pirate) (died 1704), active in the Indian Ocean and Red Sea
- John C. Bowen (1872–1957), Canadian clergyman
- John Clyde Bowen (1888–1978), American federal judge
- John Eliot Bowen (1858–1890), American author
- John Gilbert Bowen (1947–2019), British-born American porn director John T. Bone
- John Henry Bowen (1780–1822), American politician
- John J. Bowen Jr. (born 1955), American entrepreneur
- John S. Bowen (1830–1863), Confederate Army general
- John S. Bowen (executive) (born c. 1927), American advertising executive
- John S. Bowen (sound designer), American synthesizer designer
- John Templeton Bowen (1857–1940), American dermatologist
- John W. Bowen (1926–2011), Republican politician in the Ohio Senate
- John W. Bowen (U.S. Army general) (1910–1977), U.S. Army lieutenant general
- John W. E. Bowen Sr. (1855–1933), African-American Methodist clergyman and educator
- John William Bowen (1876–1965), Member of Parliament for Crewe, 1929–1931
- Jonathan Bowen (born 1956), British computer scientist
- José Antonio Bowen (born 1952), president of Goucher College
- Joseph R. Bowen (1950–2022), American politician
- Julie Bowen (born 1970), American actress
- Katie Bowen (born 1994), New Zealand association footballer
- Keith Bowen (born 1958), English footballer
- Kenneth Bowen (tenor) (1932–2018), Welsh tenor
- Lionel Bowen (1922–2012), Australian politician
- Lorraine Bowen (born 1961), singer/songwriter and comedian
- Luke Kibet Bowen (born 1983), Kenyan marathon runner
- Lynne Bowen (born 1940), Canadian historian, professor and journalist
- Mark Bowen (footballer) (born 1963), Welsh (soccer) footballer
- Mark Bowen (writer), American writer
- Mark Bowen (cricketer) (born 1967), English cricketer
- Sir Mark Edward Mortimer Bowen, 5th Baronet (1958–2014) of the Bowen baronets
- Mark Bowen, lead guitarist of British rock bank Idles
- Matt Bowen (born 1982), Australian rugby player
- Matt Bowen (American football) (born 1976), American football player
- Matt Bowen (musician), American musician
- Michael Bowen (actor) (born 1957), American film and television actor
- Michael Bowen (artist) (1937–2009), American artist
- Michael Bowen (bishop) (1930–2019), British Roman Catholic archbishop
- Murray Bowen (1913–1990), American psychiatrist
- Nanci Bowen (born 1967), American professional golfer
- Natasha Bowen, Nigerian-Welsh writer and teacher
- Nicholas Bowen, educator
- Nigel Bowen (1911–1994), Australian lawyer, politician and judge
- Norman L. Bowen (1887–1956), Canadian geochemist and petrologist
- Oliver Bowen (1942–2000), Canadian engineer
- Otis Bowen (1918–2013), physician and Governor of Indiana
- Peyton Bowen (born 2004), American football player
- Rees Bowen (1809–1879), United States House of Representatives for Virginia
- Richard Bowen (Royal Navy) (1761–1797), officer
- Richard L. Bowen (born 1933), president of Idaho State University
- Richard M. Bowen III, Citigroup whistleblower
- Richard Bowen (bowls) (born 1957), Welsh lawn bowler
- Rob Bowen (born 1981), baseball catcher
- Robert Bowen (politician) (born 1948), Colorado House of Representatives
- Robert O. Bowen (1920–2003), American novelist and essayist
- Robert Sidney Bowen (1900–1977), World War I pilot, journalist and author
- Robin E. Bowen, American college administrator
- Robin Huw Bowen (born 1957), Welsh harpist
- Roger Bowen (1932–1996), American actor
- Rufus Bowen (Robert Edward Bowen, 1947–1978), American mathematician
- Ryan Bowen (born 1975), basketball player
- Ryan Bowen (baseball) (born 1968), baseball player
- Sam Bowen (baseball) (born 1952), American baseball player
- Sam Bowen (boxer) (born 1992), British boxer
- Sam Bowen (footballer, born 1976) (born 1976), English footballer
- Sam Bowen (footballer, born 2001) (born 2001), Welsh footballer
- Samuel Edward Bowen (1903–1981), English footballer
- Sandra Bowen (born 1941), American civil servant
- Sandra Bowen (born 1976), Australian volleyball player
- Shepard P. Bowen (1824–1908), New York politician
- Sherfield Bowen (born 1959), Antiguan politician
- Stephen Bowen (American football) (born 1984), African-American football player
- Stephen Bowen (astronaut) (born 1964), American astronaut
- Stephen Bowen (biologist), American fish biologist and former educator of Emory University
- Stephen Bowen (politician) (born 1969), Maine House of Representatives
- Sir Thomas Frederic Charles Bowen, 4th Baronet (1921–1989) of the Bowen baronets
- Thomas Ambrose Bowen (1916–1982), inventor of the Bowen technique
- Thomas H. Bowen (1850–1896), South Australian surveyor
- Thomas M. Bowen (1835–1906), U.S. Senator
- Thomas Bowen (engraver) (died 1790), map engraver
- Thomas Bowen (Wisconsin politician) (1808–1883), Wisconsin state senator
- Thomas Bowen (Independent minister) (1756–1827), Welsh Independent minister
- Thomas Jefferson Bowen (1814–1875), American expatriate Baptist missionary
- Tom Bowen (athletic director) (born 1961), American sports executive
- Tommy Bowen, member of the English band White Lies (band)
- Tommy Bowen (footballer) (1900–1954), English footballer
- Trevor Bowen (born 1941), English actor and screenwriter
- Trevor Bowen (rugby), British rugby union and rugby league footballer
- Tristan Bowen (born 1991), African-American soccer player
- Vanessa Bowen (born 1974), Sri Lankan cricketer
- Wade Bowen (born 1978), Texas country and red dirt singer
- William Bowen (actor) (1666–1718), British stage actor
- William Bowen (rugby union) (1862–1925), Welsh rugby union footballer
- William Bowen (author) (1877–1937), children's author and Newbery Honor recipient
- William Bowen (British Army officer) (1898–1961), general
- William G. Bowen (1933–2016), president of Princeton University
- William Miller Bowen (1862–1937), civic leader in Los Angeles
- York Bowen (1884–1961), English composer

== See also ==
- Bowen (disambiguation)
- Ab Owen
- Ab Owain
- Bowens (surname)
- Bown
- Bowne
- Owen (name), given name and surname
- Owens (surname)
