= Thomas Bowen =

Thomas, Tom or Tommy Bowen may refer to:

- Thomas H. Bowen (1850–1896), South Australian surveyor
- Thomas M. Bowen (1835–1906), U.S. senator
- Thomas Bowen (engraver) (died 1790), Welsh map engraver
- Thomas Bowen (Wisconsin politician) (1808–1883), member of the Wisconsin State Senate
- Thomas Bowen (Independent minister) (1756–1827), Welsh Independent minister
- Thomas Jefferson Bowen (1814–1875), American expatriate Baptist missionary
- Thomas "Tom" Ambrose Bowen (1916–1982), inventor of the Bowen technique
- Tom Bowen (athletic director) (born 1961), American sports executive
- Tom Bowen (rugby union, born 1993), English rugby union player
- Tom Bowen (rugby union, born 2006), Welsh rugby union player
- Tommy Bowen (footballer) (1900–1954), English footballer
- Tommy Bowen, fictional character in Haven
- Sir Thomas Bowen, 4th Baronet (1921–1989), of the Bowen baronets
- Tommy Bowen, member of the English band White Lies

== See also ==
- Tom Bowens (born 1940), American basketball player
- Tom Webb-Bowen (1879–1956), Royal Air Force officer
- Bowen (surname)
