= John Bowen =

John or Jack Bowen may refer to:

== Politicians ==
- William Bowen (British politician) (John William Bowen, 1876–1965), member of parliament for Crewe, 1929–1931
- John C. Bowen (1872–1957), Canadian clergyman, politician, and sixth and longest-serving lieutenant governor of Alberta
- John Henry Bowen (1780–1822), American politician
- John W. Bowen (1926–2011), Republican politician in the Ohio Senate

== Religious figures ==
- John Bowen (bishop) (1815–1859), bishop of Sierra Leone
- John W. E. Bowen Sr. (1855–1933), Methodist clergyman and educator

== Writers ==
- John Eliot Bowen (1858–1890), American author
- John Bowen (British author) (1924–2019), British playwright and novelist

== Others ==
- John Bowen (Royal Navy officer) (1780–1827), English sailor and administrator; founded the first settlement at Hobart, Australia
- John Bowen (pirate) (died 1704), pirate active in the Indian Ocean and Red Sea
- John Bowen (antiquary) (1756–1832), English painter, genealogist and antiquarian
- John Bowen (alderman) (1844–1926), English businessman
- John Clyde Bowen (1888–1978), U.S. federal judge
- John J. Bowen Jr. (born 1955), American entrepreneur
- John S. Bowen (1830–1863), American Confederate general
- John S. Bowen (executive) (born c. 1927), American advertising executive
- John S. Bowen (sound designer), American synthesizer designer
- John Templeton Bowen (1857–1940), American dermatologist
- John T. Bone (John Gilbert Bowen, 1947–2019), British-born American pornographic film director
- John W. Bowen (U.S. Army general) (1910–1977), U.S. Army lieutenant general
- John Bowen, 3rd Baronet (1918–1939), of the Bowen baronets
- Jack Bowen (rugby union) (born 2003), Australian rugby union player

== See also ==
- Jonathan Bowen (born 1956), British computer scientist and professor
- Jackie Bowen (Benjamin John Bowen, 1915–2009), Welsh rugby union and rugby league player
- Bowen (surname)
