= David Bowen =

David Bowen may refer to:

- Dave Bowen (1928–1995), Welsh football (soccer) player
- David Bowen (artist), American artist
- Dave Bowen (Australian footballer) (1886–1946), Australian rules footballer
- David Bowen (cricketer) (born 1971), English cricketer
- David Bowen (pathologist) (1924–2011), Welsh pathologist
- David Bowen (Wisconsin politician) (born 1987), member of the Wisconsin State Assembly
- David James Bowen (1925–2017), Welsh scholar
- David John Bowen (1891–1912), Welsh boxer
- David Glyn Bowen (1933–2000), Welsh Congregationalist minister and missionary
- David R. Bowen (born 1932), U.S. Representative from Mississippi
- David Bowen, Felinfoel (1774–1853), Welsh Baptist minister

== See also ==
- David Bowens (born 1977), American football player
