= Mark Bowen =

Mark Bowen may refer to:

- Mark Bowen (footballer) (born 1963), Welsh footballer and coach
- Mark Bowen (writer), American writer
- Mark Bowen (cricketer) (born 1967), English cricketer
- Mark Bowen, 5th Baronet (1958–2014) of the Bowen baronets
- MV Mark Bowen, British dredger
- Mark Bowen, lead guitarist of the band Idles
- "Mark Bowen", a song from the album We Care a Lot by Faith No More

== See also ==
- Bowen (surname)
