= Edward Bowen =

Edward Bowen may refer to:

- Edward Bowen (politician) (1780–1866), Irish-born lawyer and politician in Lower Canada
- Edward Ernest Bowen (1836–1901), Harrow schoolmaster and sportsman
- Edward Bowen (footballer, born 1858) (1858–1923), Druids F.C. and Wales international footballer
- Edward George Bowen (1911–1991), British physicist
- Edward L. Bowen (born c. 1942), American author of books on Thoroughbred horse racing
- Edward Bowen (priest) (1828–1897), Anglican priest in Ireland
- Sir Edward Bowen, 2nd Baronet (1885–1937) of the Bowen baronets

== See also ==
- Bowen (surname)
