= Albert Bowen =

Albert Bowen may refer to:

- Sir Albert Bowen, 1st Baronet (1858–1924), British-Argentinian businessman
- Albert E. Bowen (1875–1953), member of the Quorum of the Twelve Apostles of the Church of Jesus Christ of Latter-day Saints

== See also ==
- Bowen (surname)
