= David Squires =

David Squires may refer to:

- David Squires (composer), born 1957
- David Squires (cartoonist), born 1974
