= Bowen therapy =

Bowen therapy may refer to:

- Bowen technique, a remedial massage technique founded by Tom Bowen
- Bowen therapy, a psychoanalytic therapy devised by Murray Bowen
