= George Bowen (disambiguation) =

Sir George Bowen (1821–1899) was a British colonial administrator.

George Bowen may also refer to:

- George Bowen (colonial settler) (1803–1889), military officer and settler of New South Wales
- George Bowen (footballer) (1875–1945), English soccer player
- George Bowen (missionary) (1816–1888), American missionary in India
- George Bowen (New York politician) (1831–1921), New York politician
- George Bowen (rugby union) (1863–1919), Welsh international rugby union half back
- George Bevan Bowen (1858–1940), Welsh Conservative landowner and county officer in Pembrokeshire

== See also ==
- Edward George Bowen (1911–1991), British physicist
- Michael George Bowen (1930–2019), English prelate of the Roman Catholic Church
