= Clarence Winthrop Bowen =

American author and journalist (1852–1935)

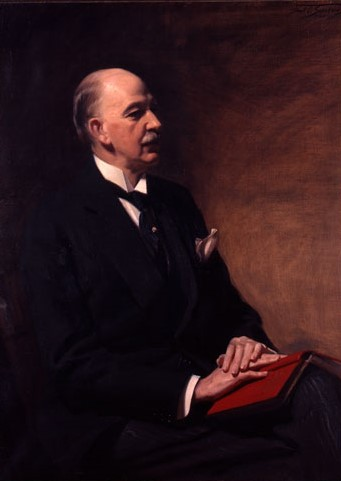
- Born: May 22, 1852; Brooklyn, New York
- Died: November 2, 1935 (aged 83); Woodstock, Connecticut
- Resting place: Woodstock Hill Cemetery
- Education: Yale University (1883)
- Occupation: Author
- Parent(s): Henry Chandler Bowen; Lucy Maria Tappan

Clarence Winthrop Bowen (1852–1935) was an American author of historical essays. He was a journalist for the New York Herald Tribune in 1874. That year, he inherited The Independent from his father, and he was its publisher until 1913 when he retired.

== Biography ==
Clarence Winthrop Bowen was born in Brooklyn, New York, on May 22, 1852. His father was Henry Chandler Bowen (1813–1896), member of dry goods firms Bowen & McNamee and Bowen, Holmes & Company, New York City, and his mother was Lucy Maria Tappan (1825–1863), daughter of Lewis and Suzanna (née Aspinwall) Tappan of Brooklyn. Lewis Tappan joined the abolitionist movement. Clarence Winthrop Bowen was a direct descendant, on his father's side, from the Puritan Apostle Eliot; on his mother's side, he was a great-grand nephew of Benjamin Franklin. He was the elder brother of John Eliot Bowen, American author.

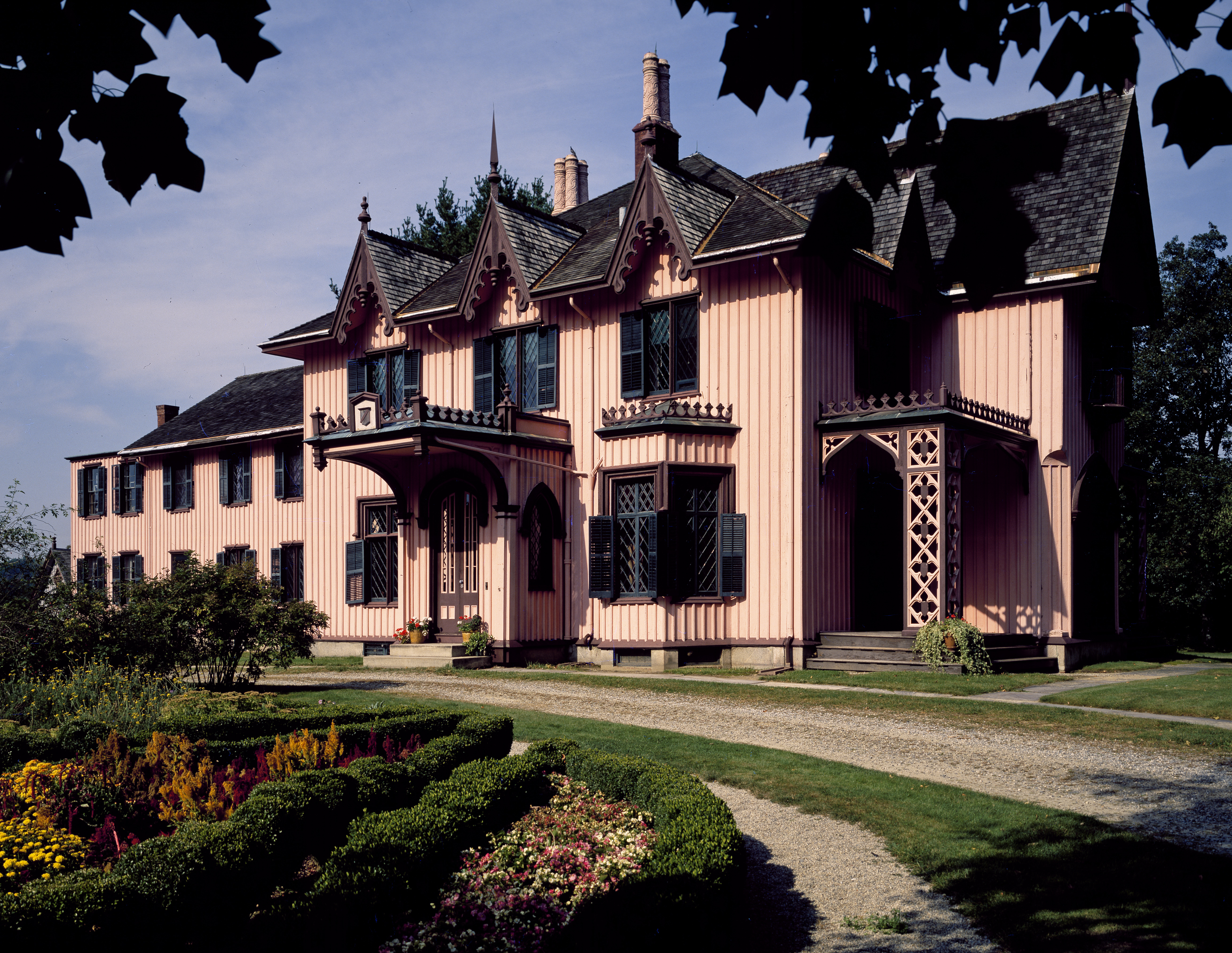
Roseland Cottage was built in 1846 in the Gothic Revival style as the summer home of Henry Chandler Bowen and family.

Bowen's father was the founder of The Independent in 1848, and subsequently sole owner and editor; Henry Chandler Bowen was the son of George and Lydia Wolcott (née Eaton) Bowen, of Woodstock, Connecticut. Roseland Cottage, also known as the Henry C. Bowen House, is a historic house located on Connecticut Route 169 in Woodstock. The house was added to the National Register of Historic Places in 1977 and was declared a National Historic Landmark in 1992.

Clarence Winthrop Bowen was a private tutor. In his freshman year at Yale, he won third prize at the Brothers in Unity Freshman debate. In his junior year, he was awarded first prize at the Junior debate and second prize for dispute appointment. His senior year he won second prize for both colloquy appointment and English composition. He was on his Class Cup Committee; member Kappa Sigma Epsilon, Delta Beta Xi (Alpha Sigma Phi), Delta Kappa Epsilon, and Wolf's Head Society.

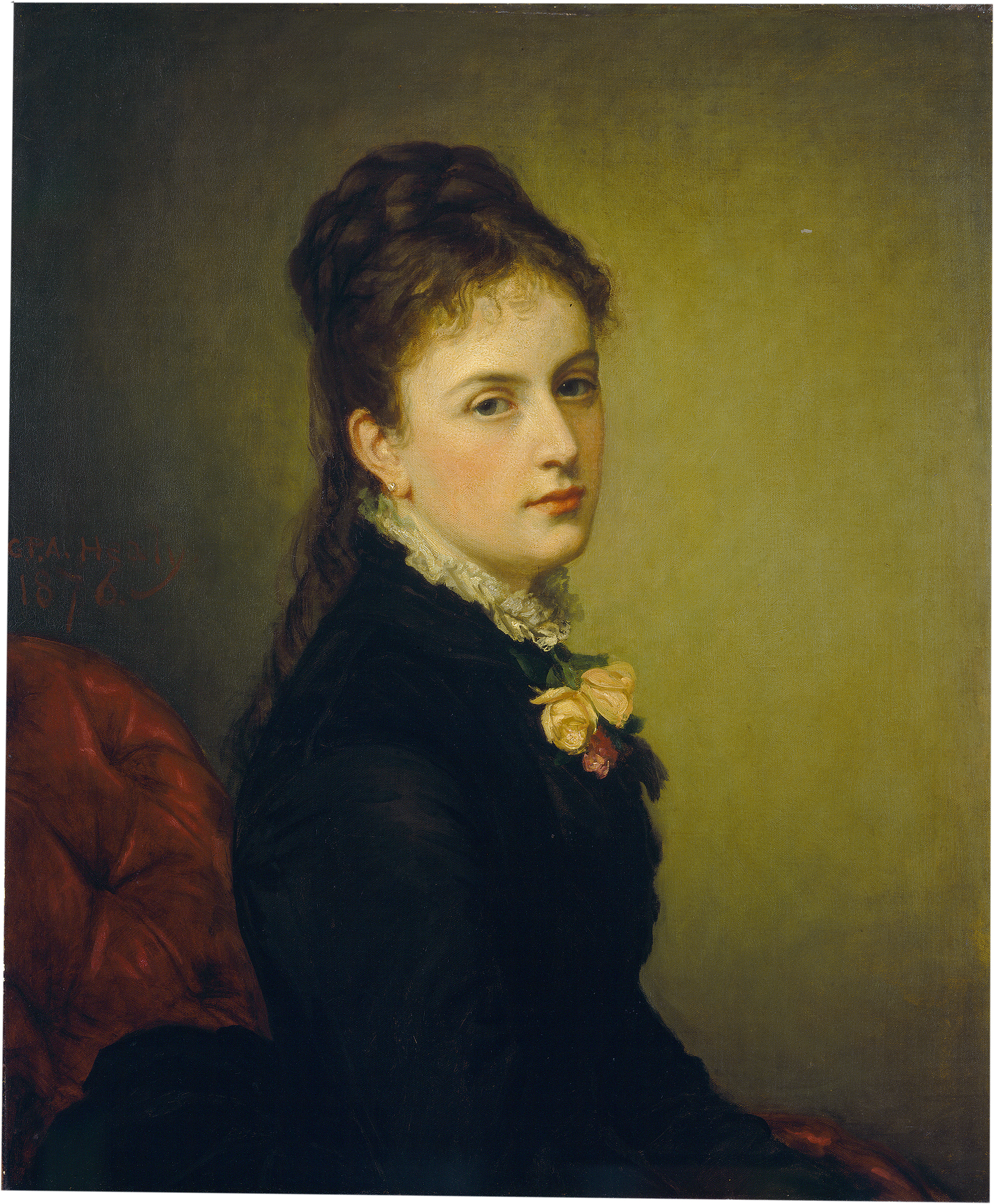
Portrait of Roxana Atwater Wentworth by George Peter Alexander Healy, 1876

Clarence Winthrop Bowen attended Yale from 1869 to 1873, then after graduation he went to Yale Divinity School, but did not follow through and instead joined the Department of History, earning a Masters in 1876 and a Ph.D in 1882. Having completed his dissertation on The Boundaries of Connecticut, in 1882 Bowen was the first doctoral candidate to receive a Ph.D. in history.

He married Roxana Atwater Wentworth on January 28, 1892, in Chicago. The following year, her veil was exhibited at the World's Fair in the city and is now at the Victoria and Albert Museum in London. The daughter of Marie Atwater (née Loomis) and John Wentworth, she died on July 10, 1935.

Bowen was the father of Roxana Wentworth Bowen (1895–1968), who married William Stephen Van Rensselaer in 1917, divorced in 1919, and in 1945, she married Sir George Gordon Vereker (1889–1976), the UK Ambassador to Finland and Uruguay, brother-in-law of John Vereker, 6th Viscount Gort (1886–1946).

Bowen died due to a cerebral hemorrhage on November 2, 1935, in Woodstock, Connecticut, and is buried at Woodstock Hill Cemetery. According to his obituary he was a man whose "optimism was contagious and his faith in the future unchanged.... He had known intimately so many leaders of thought and action for half a century, that his conversation was filled with highly interesting reminiscence." Bowen's journals and scrapbooks (1869–1934) are preserved at the American Antiquarian Society.

== Career ==
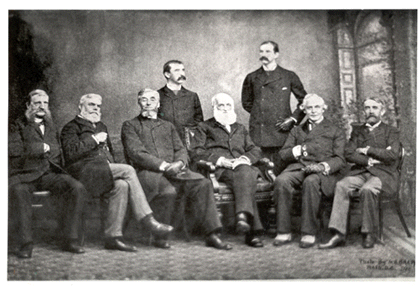
Executive officers of the American Historical Association on December 30, 1889, in Washington, D.C. Seated (l to r): William Poole, Justin Winsor, Charles Kendall Adams (President), George Bancroft, John Jay, Andrew Dickson White; standing (l to r): Herbert B. Adams, Clarence Winthrop Bowen

Clarence Winthrop Bowen was a journalist for the New York Herald Tribune in 1874. That year, he inherited The Independent from his father, and he was its publisher until 1913 when he retired.

In 1884, he was a founding member of the American Historical Association and served as treasurer until 1917. In 1887, he served on the Committee on the Centennial Celebration of the Inauguration of George Washington as President of the United States as secretary. He was elected a member of the American Antiquarian Society in 1904, and served as vice-president from 1920 to 1935; was president of the New York Genealogical and Biographical Society from 1907 to 1931; earned a doctor of laws at the College of William & Mary in 1918; and was president of the New England Society of New York from 1920 to 1922. Other appointments were: director of the Continental Fire Insurance Company; contributor to The Century Magazine; founding member of the Connecticut Historical Society; member of the executive committee of the Grant Monument Association; corresponding member of the Colonial Society of Massachusetts and Rhode Island Historical Society; honorary member of the Sociedad Columbina, Spain, and of the American Scenic and Historic Preservation Society; and trustee of the Manhattan Congregational Church in New York City.

== Works ==
- Boundary disputes of Connecticut. Boston: Osgood, 1882.
- Woodstock: An Historical Sketch. New York: Putnam, 1886.
- The History of Woodstock Connecticut. Norwood, Mass.: Plimpton Press, 1926–1943. Vol. 1, Vol. 3, Vol. 5, Vol. 6, Vol. 7
- The History of the Centennial Celebration of the Inauguration of George Washington as First President of the United States. New York: Appleton, 1892.
