= Bowenoid papulosis =

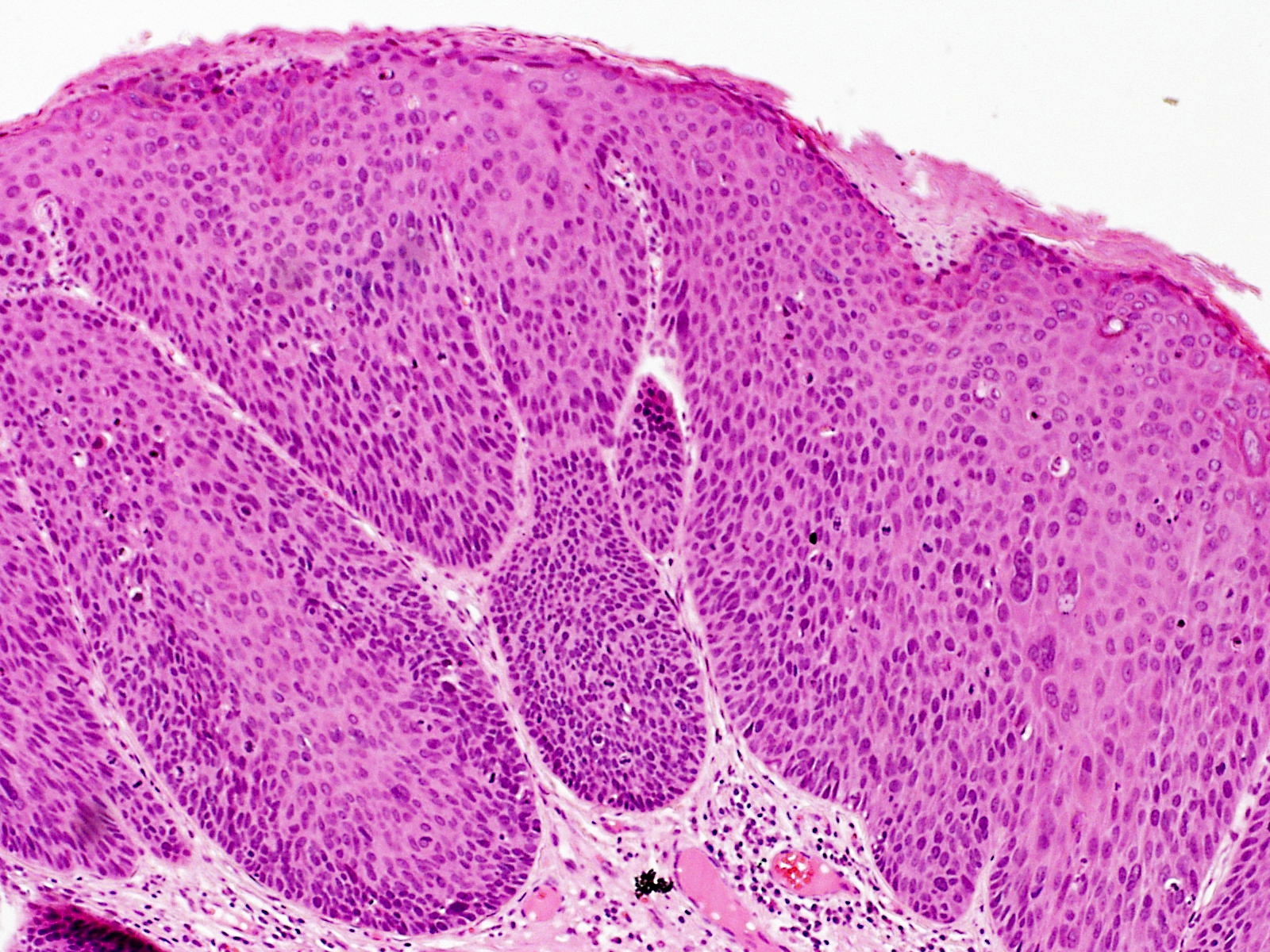
- Specialty: Dermatology

Bowenoid papulosis is a cutaneous condition characterized by the presence of pigmented verrucous papules on the body. They are associated with human papillomavirus, the causative agent of genital warts.

The term bowenoid papulosis was coined in 1977 by Kopf and Bart and is named after dermatologist John Templeton Bowen.

== Signs and symptoms ==
Bowenoid papulosis is defined by the appearance of one or more reddish-brown papules or plaques in the anogenital region that can last for a few weeks to several years. Although some patients occasionally report itching in affected perianal skin areas, the majority of individuals do not exhibit any symptoms.

== Causes ==
Although the exact cause of Bowenoid papulosis is unknown, immunologic, viral, and chemical factors have all been proposed. There have been multiple occurrences of Bowenoid papulosis where HPV DNA was found.

== Diagnosis ==
Bowenoid papulosis diagnosis requires a history, histologic examination, and clinical description of the condition.

== Treatment ==
Bowenoid papulosis is typically treated with locally destructive or ablative therapies, including 5-fluorouracil, electrocoagulation, cryotherapy, and surgical excision or razor excision. Imiquimod has also been applied with good results.

== See also ==
- Skin lesion
- Sexually transmitted infection
