= James B. Bowen House =

Historic house in Wisconsin, United States

- U.S. National Register of Historic Places
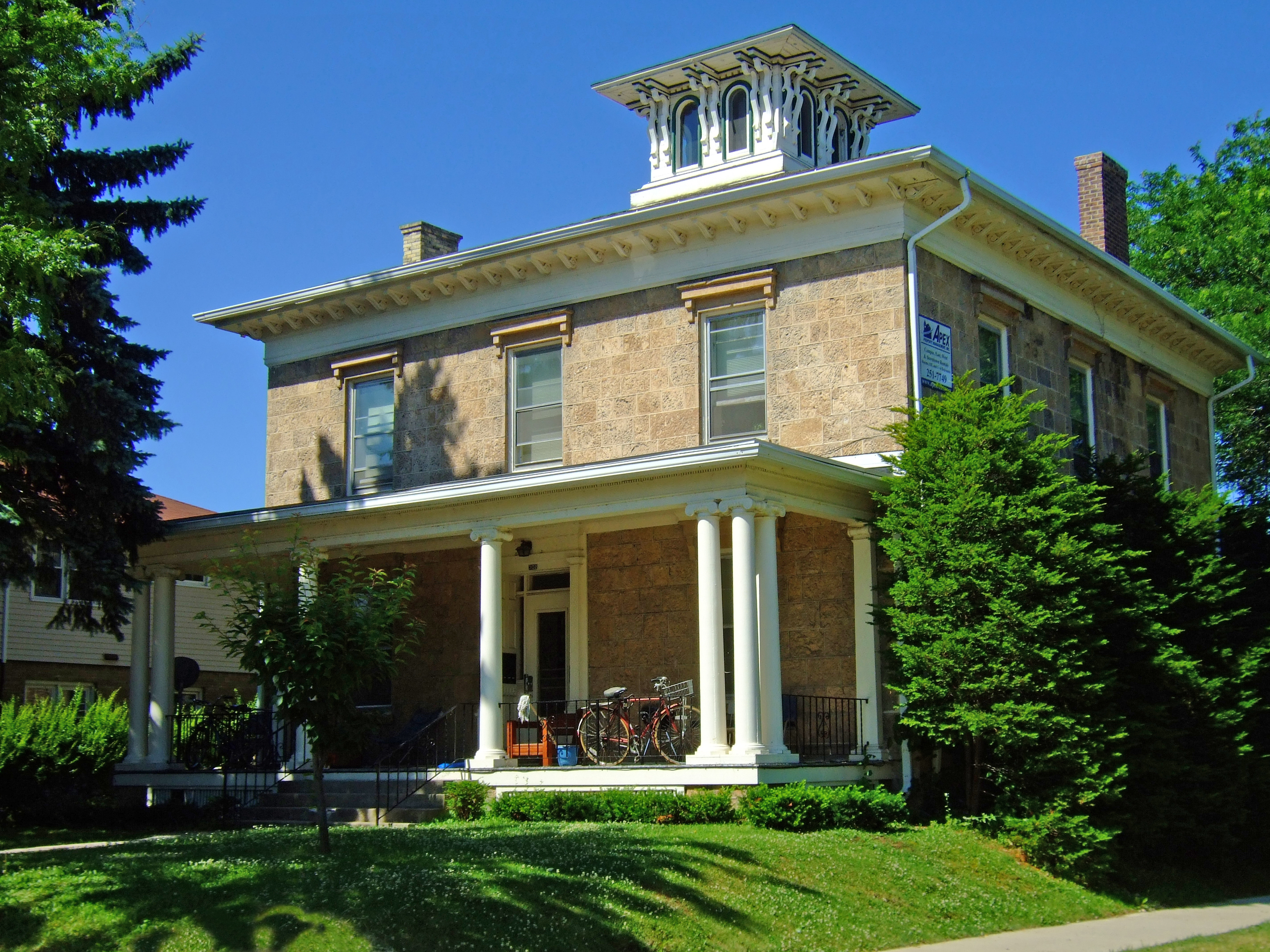

- Location within Wisconsin Location within the United States
- Location: 302 S. Mills St. Madison, Wisconsin
- Coordinates: 43°3′50″N 89°24′15″W
- Area: 0.14 acres (0.057 ha)
- Built: 1855
- Architectural style: Italianate
- NRHP reference No.: 82000648
- Added to NRHP: March 1, 1982

The James B. Bowen House (also known as the Seth Van Bergen House) is an early Italianate-styled house clad in cut sandstone, built in 1855 on what was then a farm on the outskirts of Madison, Wisconsin. In 1982 it was added to the National Register of Historic Places.

As early Madison grew, the Greenbush Addition was platted in 1854. Just to the west of that addition lay the 60-acre farm of pioneer farmer and real estate investor Seth Van Bergen and his wife Harriet. They built this house in 1855 as the centerpiece of their farm, now a block west of Meriter Hospital. Its main block is two stories with a square footprint, clad in carefully cut, local sandstone. Most of the details are Italianate style, including these hallmarks of the style: the brackets under the eaves, the low-pitched roof, and the centered cupola with paired brackets supporting its eaves. The window decoration is simple for Italianate - perhaps harking back to Greek Revival style. The one-story rear wing once housed the kitchen and servants' quarters. Originally, iron cresting ran around the edge of the roof, a one-story veranda with wooden Ionic columns fronted the east side of the house, and a matching frame carriage house stood to the southwest, but those have been removed.

The Van Bergens farmed until 1859, growing mostly oats and wheat on their 60 acres. Then they sold the house to James Barton Bowen of Connecticut, Dane County's first homeopathic physician. Bowen was elected mayor of Madison in 1871 and was involved in other business ventures, including presiding over the Park Savings Bank.

After Bowen died in 1881, his daughter and her husband Wayne Ramsay inherited the house. They replaced the original veranda with a wraparound porch in the 1890s, which was later reduced to today's porch on the east side. They split the 60-acre farm into residential lots and sold them off around the turn of the century. Their son James took over in 1914 and lived there until 1923. After that fraternities lived in the house in 1925 and 1927, it was an orphan's home in 1929, and then was split into apartments by 1935.

In 1972, the house was designated a landmark by the Madison Landmarks Commission. In 1982 it was listed on the NRHP. Today the Barton house is one of Madison's oldest surviving sandstone houses - "a prime example of well executed masonry construction that flourished in Madison during the 1850s and 1860s."
