= John Oakman =

John Oakman (c.1748–1793) was an English engraver and writer.

== Life ==
Oakman was born in Hendon about 1748, and was educated at a grammar school. He was apprenticed to the map-engraver Emanuel Bowen, but left before completing his indenture, in consequence of an affair with his daughter, whom he afterwards married.

He kept a shop in partnership with Matthias Darly for the sale of caricatures and similar prints, "but the love of pleasure and good company got so much the better of his judgment that he was soon put to other contrivances to obtain a living." Having some literary facility, he made money by writing several disreputable novels, such as The Life and Adventures of Benjamin Brass (1765), partly based on his early life, The History of Sir Edward Haunch, and others. His book The Adventures of William Williams, an African Prince, whom Oakman met in Liverpool prison, had some success through its attack on slavery as an institution. "He wrote for two guineas a set of two volumes; and such was his rapidity, that he could produce one work a week."

Oakman had a gift for song-writing, and wrote many popular songs for Vauxhall Gardens, Bermondsey Spa and elsewhere; he also wrote burlettas for the performances at Astley's Amphitheatre. He engraved on wood illustrations for children's books and cheap literature. After a somewhat vagrant life, Oakman died destitute at his sister's house in Westminster in October 1793, and was buried at Holy Trinity Minories.
