= Frederick Bullock (mayor) =

Australian politician

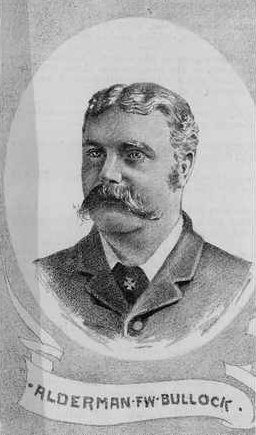
ca. 1880

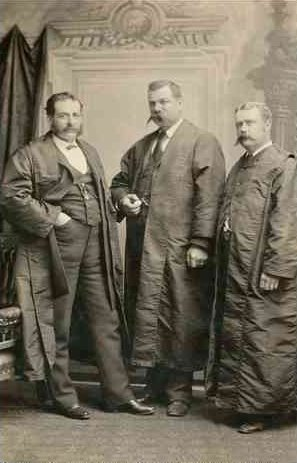
Mayors of Adelaide: Judah Moss Solomon (1869-71); James Shaw (1888-9); Frederick William Bullock (1891-2) ca. 1890

Frederick William Bullock (7 August 1851 – 31 May 1931) was a successful Adelaide real estate agent and the mayor of Adelaide from 1891 to 1892.

His father, John Bullock migrated to Australia in 1839, set up business as a real estate agent, and was a director of the Burra Mine. He died 24 March 1879, aged 65, and was buried at the West Terrace Cemetery.

As a 15-year-old, Frederick's mother took him from Adelaide to London in the saloon of the City of Adelaide. This voyage departed Port Adelaide on 26 December 1866 and featured a well-documented ocean race with the Yatala. Young Frederick's diary of the three-month journey has survived.

He was educated at J. L. Young's Adelaide Educational Institution.

He followed his father in real estate, founding F. W. Bullock and Co. with offices in King William Street.

He was elected councillor for the Gawler ward (which his father had previously represented) with the Adelaide City Council in 1884 and became alderman a year later. He was elected mayor on 1 December 1891 after occasionally acting in that position during mayor L Cohen's absences earlier that year. He was succeeded by Alderman Willcox in December 1892 after a close contest with Alderman Sketheway.

He was an active Freemason.

== Family ==
In 1873 Bullock married Harriett Bowen (died 9 September 1910), sister of fellow AEI student Thomas H. Bowen. Of their eight children, two daughters and two sons survived him.

- Elma Beatrice (1874–1956)
- Harold John Bullock (1876–1924)
- Winifred Bullock (1878–1897)
- Oliver Franklin Bullock (1880–1901)
- Royden George Bullock (1882– ) continued with the company. He was president of the Real Estate Institute of South Australia in 1937.
- Leonard Frederick Bullock (20 May 1886 – )
- Doris Jean Bullock (16 March 1888 – 1967)
- Hugh Kenneth Bullock (1889–1904)
