= D'Arcy Masius Benton & Bowles =

Former American advertising agency

- Industry: Advertising
- Predecessors: Benton & Bowles and D'Arcy-MacManus Masius
- Founded: 1985; 41 years ago
- Founder: William C. D'Arcy
- Defunct: 2002
- Fate: Acquired by Publicis
- Area served: 131 offices in 75 countries
- Owner: Publicis
- Parent: Publicis

D'Arcy Masius Benton & Bowles was an advertising agency in the United States with 131 offices in 75 countries.

The company was founded in 1906 as the D'Arcy Company in St. Louis, Missouri. Early clients included Coca-Cola and Anheuser-Busch.

During the Depression, D'Arcy executive Archie Lee and illustrator Haddon Sundblom created the original Santa Claus icon for Coca-Cola ads. The Coca-Cola version of Santa Claus was a departure from earlier German depictions of St. Nicholas as a thin, aloof fellow. The firm also engineered such slogans as: "It's not nice to fool Mother Nature" (Chiffon Margarine); "Taste the rainbow" (Skittles); and "Melts in your mouth—not in your hands" (M&M's). Anheuser-Busch's slogan "This Bud's for you" was created by D'Arcy St. Louis. The firm was also responsible for Trans World Airlines' "We Want To Be Your Airline" campaign, launched in 1997 as an effort to update the airline's image amid financial turbulence.

In November 1985, D'Arcy-MacManus Masius (D-MM) merged with Benton & Bowles (B&B) to form D'Arcy Masius Benton & Bowles (DMB&B). John Bowen oversaw the merger and the firm's drive toward globalization.

In 1999, the company had worldwide billings of $6.7 billion and was the 11th largest advertising agency in the world.

In 2002, DMB&B was acquired by the French firm Publicis and closed. The D'Arcy Masius Benton & Bowles archives were transferred to the Hartman Center for Sales, Advertising and Marketing History, part of the David M. Rubenstein Rare Book and Manuscript Library at Duke University in 1991. An additional, and final, donation took place in 2001.

== Key dates ==
- 1906: William C. D'Arcy opens an advertising firm in St. Louis.
- 1923: D'Arcy opens his first office outside St. Louis, in Atlanta, where a major client, Coca-Cola, is located.
- 1934: The D'Arcy Company opens a New York office.
- 1970: D'Arcy Co. merges with MacManus, John & Adams, Inc., a Detroit-based agency, and becomes "D'Arcy-MacManus.
- 1972: The firm merges with the British agency, Masius, Wynne-Williams, and becomes "D'Arcy-MacManus & Masius" (DM&M).
- 1986: DM&M merges with New York ad agency Benton & Bowles and becomes "D'Arcy Masius Benton & Bowles" (DMB&B).
- 1996: DMB&B acquires N.W. Ayer and Partners renames its holding company "The MacManus Group".
- 1999: The MacManus Group announces a merger with the "Leo Group", a parent holding company of the Leo Burnett Co.
- 2000: Susan Gianinno and Lee Garfinkel start winning new business from clients like Heineken and Cadbury.
- 2002: Acquired by Publicis.

== Major clients ==
Major clients for the company's advertising creative and media services included:

- Anderson Clayton & Company
- Anheuser-Busch
- Baskin Robbins
- Blue Cross of California
- Coca-Cola Company
- General Motors
- Lockheed Martin
- M&M's / Mars Incorporated
- MoneyGram
- Procter & Gamble
- Tourism Australia
