= Hilda Bowen =

Bahamian nurse

- 1983
- Born: Hilda Valeria Barnice Bowen; 12 October 1923; Nassau, Bahamas
- Died: 2002 (aged 78–79); Nassau, The Bahamas
- Occupations: Nurse, nursing administrator
- Years active: 1953-1990s
- Known for: establishing the modern nursing profession in the Bahamas

Hilda Bowen, MBE (12 October 1923 – 20 March 2002) was a Bahamian nurse. Graduating with a degree in ophthalmic nursing and midwifery, she became the first Bahamian-trained nurse. In 1962, she was the first Bahamian to become matron of the public hospital and in 1965, was installed as principal matron of the Public Health Department. She worked as the Chief Nursing Officer of the Ministry of Health between 1970 and 1980 and thereafter served as the country's Director of Nursing. She drove for the establishment of the Bahamas Nursing Council, a governing body for the country's nursing industry and was influential in developing a degree based nursing certification. She was honored as a Member of the Order of the British Empire in 1969 for her contributions to the medical development of the country.

== Early life ==
Hilda Valeria Barnice Bowen was born on 12 October 1923 in Nassau, Bahamas to Jestina (née Johnson) and Irvin Bowen. Born into a family of six, she attended St. Francis Xavier primary school in New Providence, the Western Junior and Senior Schools, and graduated from the Government High School in a class of fifty students with only around 8 girls. When she completed her schooling in 1942, she worked as a teacher for grade one elementary students for three years.

In 1946, Bowen was chosen by the Governor-General of the Bahamas to participate in the Colonial Scholarship Program which promoted studies in the United Kingdom to aid in the improvement of the Caribbean Colonial Territories. She was the first person selected to study nursing with the intent of developing the field in The Bahamas and enrolled in a three-year basic nursing curricula at the Farnborough General Hospital in Orpington, Kent. When she graduated in 1950 with her State Registered Nurse Qualification, Bowen became the first Afro-Bahamian trained as a nurse. To further her education, she enrolled at the Moorfields Eye Hospital in London, receiving the Bronze Buckle award and certification as an ophthalmic nurse in 1951.

At that time, nurses could not obtain a position in the Bahamas without a certification as a midwife. To ensure her employment, Bowen then enrolled in midwifery studies at the Elsie Inglis Memorial Maternity Hospital in Edinburgh, Scotland. She completed her certification with additional schooling at the Stirling Royal Infirmary, earning a State Certified Midwife qualification. Bowen began applying for nursing positions while she was still in England in 1952, but it took a year for her to secure employment.

== Career ==
Bowen returned to the Bahamas in 1953 and began working as a sister at Bahamas General Hospital on 5 October 1953. In 1962, she was appointed as the first Bahamian-born matron at the public hospital, Princess Margaret Hospital. She became principal matron of the Public Health Department in 1965 and in 1970 became the Chief Nursing Officer of the Ministry of Health, overseeing nurse placements and work throughout the country.

Pressing for nursing standards and governance of their activities, Bowen was instrumental in the creation of the Bahamas Nursing Council. She was honored as a Member of the Order of the British Empire in 1969 for her contributions to the medical development of the country. In 1980, she was made the Director of Nursing, a position created for her to influence and build the profession of nursing in the country. During her tenure, she pressed for the creation of university training and a curricula to be developed in the Bahamas for nurses. Negotiations with the College of the Bahamas began in 1982 to offer an Associate degree in Nursing. By 1984, a program had been developed and a period of phasing-in degree-based certification rather than the previous diploma-based certification was implemented between 1984 and 1991. In 1991, the library at the College of the Bahamas expanded to encompass the former Bahamas School of Nursing facility. This new branch library was named in honor of Bowen in 1994.

== Death and legacy ==
Bowen died in 2002 and is credited with developing the modern nursing profession in the Bahamas.
