= David John Bowen =

Welsh professional boxer (1891–1912)

Dai Bowen
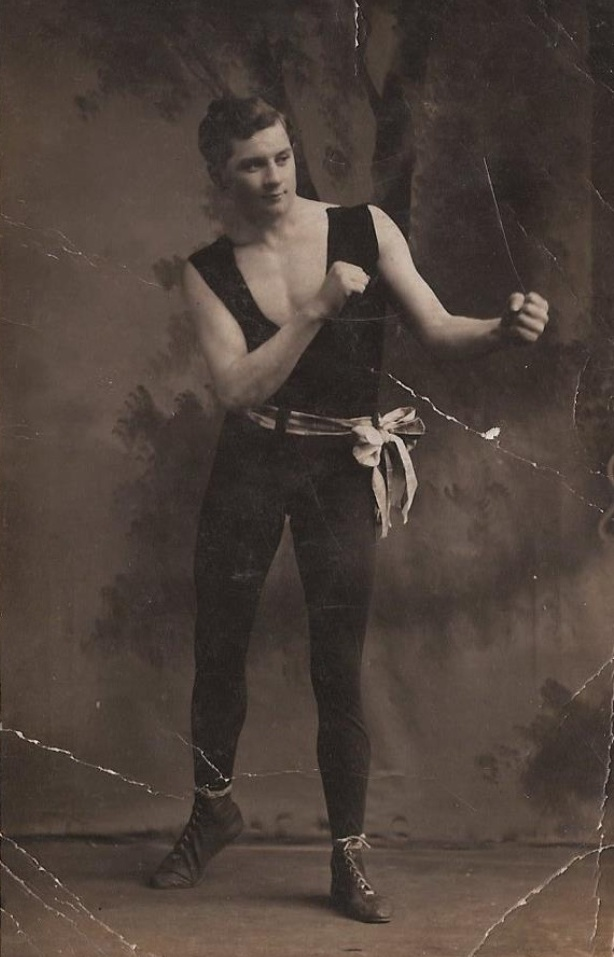
- Born: 30 July 1891; Treherbert, Glamorgan, Wales
- Died: 15 April 1912 (aged 20); North Atlantic Ocean
- Occupation: Boxer
- Relatives: David Squires (great-great-nephew)
- Boxing career
- Weight: Lightweight

Boxing record
- Total fights: 8

David John "Dai" Bowen (30 July 1891 – 15 April 1912) was a Welsh professional boxer, who died in the sinking of the RMS Titanic, along with fellow Welsh boxer Leslie Williams.

== Youth and training ==
Bowen was born on 30 July 1891 at Baglan Street, Ystradyfodwg, near Treherbert to James Bowen and Leah (née Protheroe), the 7th of 8 children. Originally a collier, Bowen left the mines to become a boxer and was later trained to box by George Cundick, who had learnt his art as a physical training instructor with the British Army in India and who also had trained Leslie "Les" Williams, John Bowen's best friend. Dai Bowen won the Welsh lightweight title, and started boxing on the various British circuits.

== Fights ==
David John Bowen's professional fights were as follows:

1910
2 April - Young Roberts (Treherbert), Pontypridd Millfield AC
20 August – Jack Titt (Pentre)

1911
10 April – "Young" (Johnny) Walters (Pontypool), Pontypridd Millfield AC
14 October – Gus Venn (Pontypridd), Pontypridd Millfield AC
11 November – Batt McCarthy (Penarth), Hartlepool "Olympia"
rink
20 November – Gerry Delaney (Bradford), South Shields
25 November – Billy Grant (Stockton), Hartlepool "Olympia" rink

1912
5 March – "Young" Walters (Pontypool), Cardiff Park Hall (Dai's last fight)

== Voyage on Titanic and death ==
Cundick arranged for a series of boxing contests in the United States for both of his boxers including a fight with Packey McFarland, and they booked tickets with agents Dean and Dawson in Cardiff (ticket number 54636; 16 pounds, 2 shillings). Their ticket was a higher price than the regular steerage ticket as it allowed them access to the first class passengers' gym.

Dai and Les were originally due to sail for America on the Lusitania on Saturday 6 April 1912. They had to wait for Dai's new suit to arrive, which meant they found passage on the Titanic instead.

Boarding the Titanic at Southampton as third-class passengers, Bowen wrote a letter to his mother:

11th April 1912
My Dear Mother
I am just writing you a few lines before I go sick for I have been very good so far. This is a lovely boat, she is very near so big as Treherbert, she is like a floating palace, against you walk from one end of her to the other you are tired. We are landing in France the time I am writing you this, you don't know whether she is moving or not for she goes very steady. Dear Mother, I hope that you won't worry yourself about me, I can tell you that I am a lot better than I thought I would be, for we gets plenty of fun on board. We met two Swansea boys at the station, so you see that I get plenty of company. There is hundreds of foreigners on her of every nation. The food we get here is very good but not so good as dear old home. We have no boxing gloves with us, they would be no good if we did have some. Remember me to Martha Jane and Jack and Tommy Ostler, tell Morris and Stephen that if I will feel like I do now when I land in Yankee Land I shall be alright. I shan't give you no address now, not until I land for it won't be worth. I did not see David Rees in Southampton at all. Remember me to all I know, tell Stephen to tell all the boys that I am enjoying myself alright so far. If James tell you that I have not wrote to him, tell him that I can't do it very good now, you can show him this if you like, for it will be the same I shall have to say now for the time being as I am telling you. I hope you will excuse the pencil for I have no pen and ink, so cheer up now mother, for I am in the pink, so don't vex. I think I will draw to a close now in wishing you all my best love.
From your loving son,
David John

Both boxers died in the sinking, although Bowen's body was never recovered. The body of Williams was recovered by the CS Mackay-Bennett, and buried at sea on Monday 22 April 1912.

David John Bowen was 20 years old and single at his time of death. He lived at 42 Baglan Street, Treherbert with his widowed mother, remarried as Mrs Leah Owen and his youngest brother Stephen Bowen. Bowen's family paid for a grave site memorial in his honour to be erected in Treorchy Cemetery.

Stephen Bowen wrote the following poem as a tribute to the loss of his brother:

In loving memory of my dear
brother David John Bowen.
No more I'll see him in our midst
No more his voice I'll hear
For death has been and taken away
The one I loved so dear.
Twilight and evening bell
And after that the dark.
And may there be no sadness or farewell
When it embark.
Some day, some time my eyes shall see thy loving face
Never shall your memory fade.

== Notable relatives ==
Bowen is the great-great uncle of the cartoonist David Squires, most notable for his work for The Guardian newspaper.
