= Ashley Bowen =

American sailor & writer (1728–1813)

Ashley Bowen (1728–1813) was the first American sailor to write an autobiography. Although Bowen's career as a sailor was not particularly remarkable, his writings are of great value in understanding the life of an average sailor at that time. Bowen was a sailor from the age of 13 to the age of 35.

== Youth ==
Ashley Bowen was born on January 8, 1728. He grew up in the town of Marblehead, Massachusetts, until going to sea at age eleven. Bowen's mother died when he was twelve, and he suffered personal turmoil when his father remarried soon after. At the age of "13 year and three month" Bowen was apprenticed to Captain Peter Hall of Boston.

== Seafaring years ==
Bowen went to sea as a living from the age of 13 on, suffering cruelly under the harsh beatings of his master. Although repeated escape attempts failed, Bowen was finally able to escape Hall at the age of 17. Finally away from his master, Bowen spent the next eighteen years in the employment of several organizations, including the Royal Navy and British traders. During this time, Bowen made money transporting cargo, serving in the British navy, and trading goods. Bowen was also held prisoner during the Seven Years' War by the French.

== Family life and giving up the sea ==
In 1758, Bowen married Dorothea Chadwick, who bore him six children during their marriage. At the time, Bowen was 30 years old, and the fact that he had a wife on land made him think of retirement. Eventually, Bowen gave up seafaring at the age of 35, and set up a rigging business in Marblehead, Massachusetts. The business was a moderate success, providing enough income to get by, but never by much. Dorothea died in 1771; the same year, Bowen married Mary Shaw. Shaw died in 1781, and the next year Bowen married Hannah Graves. Bowen's final child was born in 1797. Although Bowen had amassed some wealth through his business and his adventures at sea, as he grew elderly, he was completely dependent upon his children for his upkeep. Bowen died in 1813.

== Impact of Bowen's life and autobiography ==
Although Bowen did not become a master of his own ship or have notable seafaring adventures for his time, his historical contribution is important. Because Bowen was the first American sailor to write an autobiography, his account gives historians valuable insight into life as an 18th-century sailor. Bowen's autobiography and journal had been an important archival source for scholars and in 1973 it was edited by Phillip Chadwick Foster Smith and published by the Colonial Society of Massachusetts. More recently, in 2006, The Autobiography of Ashley Bowen was published by itself by Broadview Editions, edited with an Introduction by Daniel Vickers.
