= Emanuel Bowen =

Welsh engraver (1694–1767)

- Born: 1694; Tal-y-Llychau, Wales,
- Died: 8 May 1767 (aged 72–73)
- Notable work: Britannia Depicta
- Children: 1 son

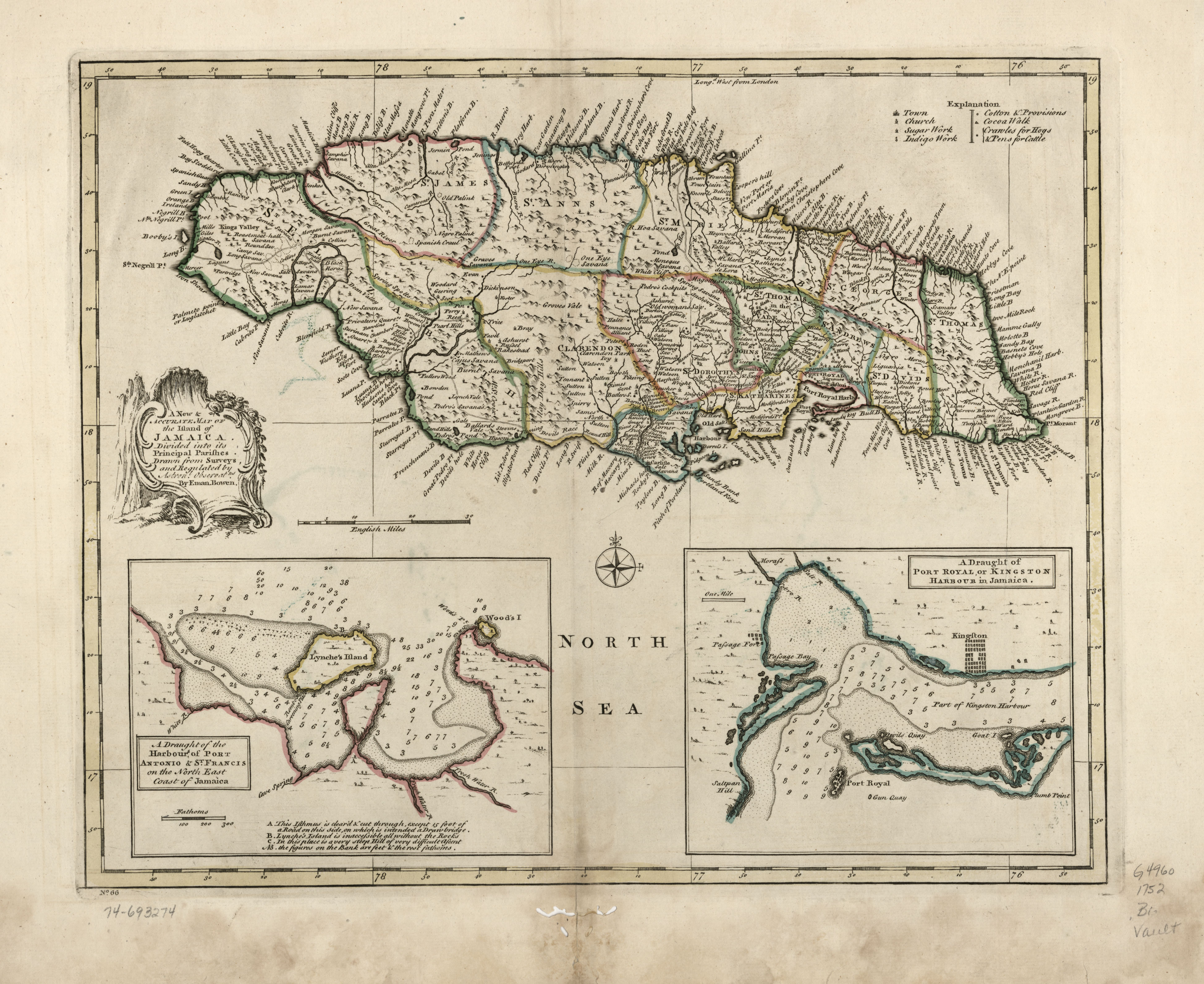
A New & Accurate Map of the Island of Jamaica. Divided into its Principal Parishes. Emanuel Bowen, 1752.

Emanuel Bowen (1694 – 8 May 1767) was a Welsh map engraver, who achieved the unique distinction of becoming Royal Mapmaker to both King George II of Great Britain and King Louis XV of France. Bowen was highly regarded by his contemporaries for producing some of the largest, most detailed and most accurate maps of his era. He worked with most prominent British cartographers of the period including John Owen and Herman Moll.

== Background ==
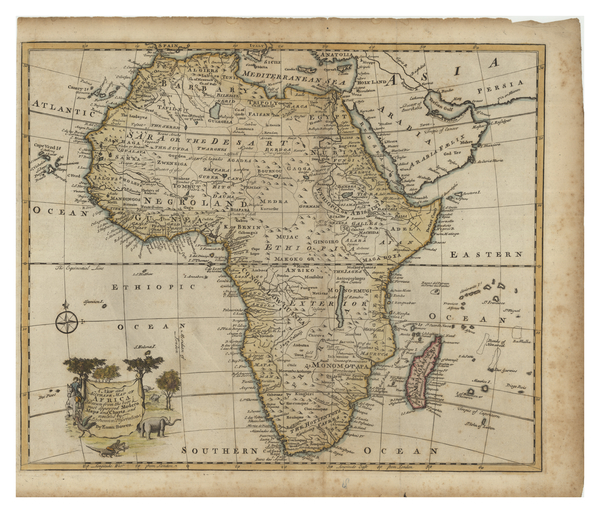
A New and Accurate Map of Africa. Drawn from the best & most approved Modern Maps and Charts and regulated by Astronomical Observations. (1760)

Bowen was born at Tal-y-Llychau (now Talley), Carmarthenshire, Wales. His father was Owen Bowen, a prominent member of the local gentry (i e. "a distinguished but not noble gentleman").

In 1709, Emanuel Bowen was apprenticed as a merchant tailor to Charles Price. Bowen worked in London from 1714 and was admitted to the Merchant Taylors Livery Company on 3 October 1716.

== Career ==
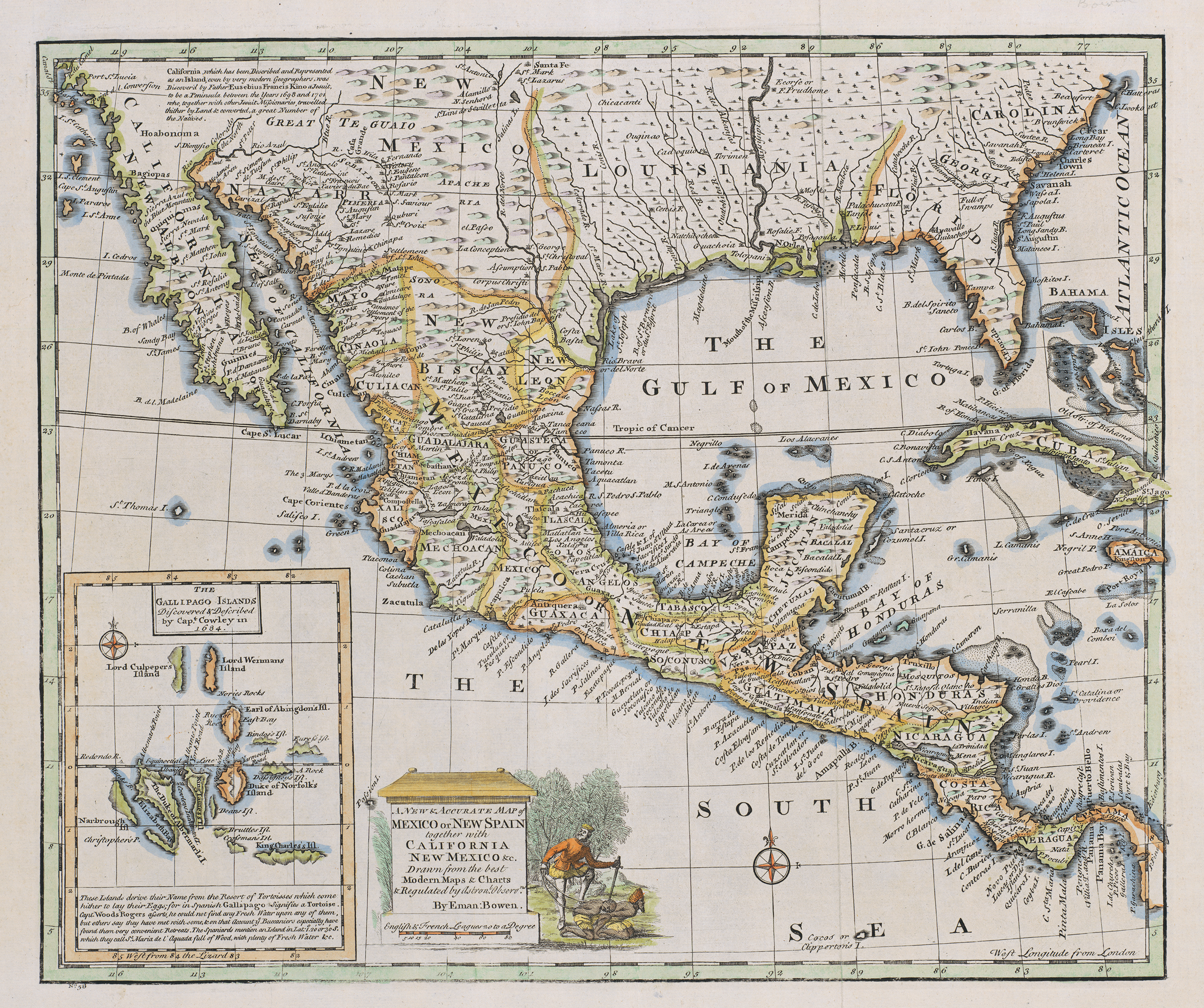
A New & Accurate Map of Mexico or New Spain together with California, New Mexico &c. Bowen, 1752

One of his earliest engraved works, Britannia Depicta, published in 1720, contained over two hundred road maps together with a miniature county map of each of the counties of England and Wales. It followed on John Ogilby's earlier work with updated style of historical and heraldic detail. It was an unusual feature of the atlas that the maps were engraved on both sides of each page, resulting in a handier-sized book.

By 1726, he was noted as one of the leading London engravers. Among his multiple apprentices, the most notable were Thomas Kitchin, Thomas Jeffreys, and John Lodge. Another apprentice, John Oakman who had an affair with and eventually married, Bowen's daughter. Other Bowen apprentices include Thomas Buss, John Pryer, Samuel Lyne, William Fowler and his own son Thomas Bowen.

He published "A Complete System of Geography, 1744–7; an 'English Atlas, with a new set of maps,' 1745(?); a 'Complete Atlas ... in sixty-eight Maps,' 1752; 'Atlas Minimus; or a new set of Pocket Maps,' 1758; and a series of separate maps of the English counties, of Germany, Asia Minor, and Persia, between 1736 and 1776.

A recurring feature of Bowen's work, evident even on the early road maps, was his habit of filling every corner and space of the map with jottings and footnotes, both historical and topographical.

== Death ==
In spite of his royal patronage and renown, Bowen like many cartographers of his day, would die in poverty. His son, Thomas Bowen (1733–1790) would carry on the business, but would ultimately suffer a similar fate, dying in a Clerkenwell workhouse in 1790.

== Complete map of the Southern Continent ==
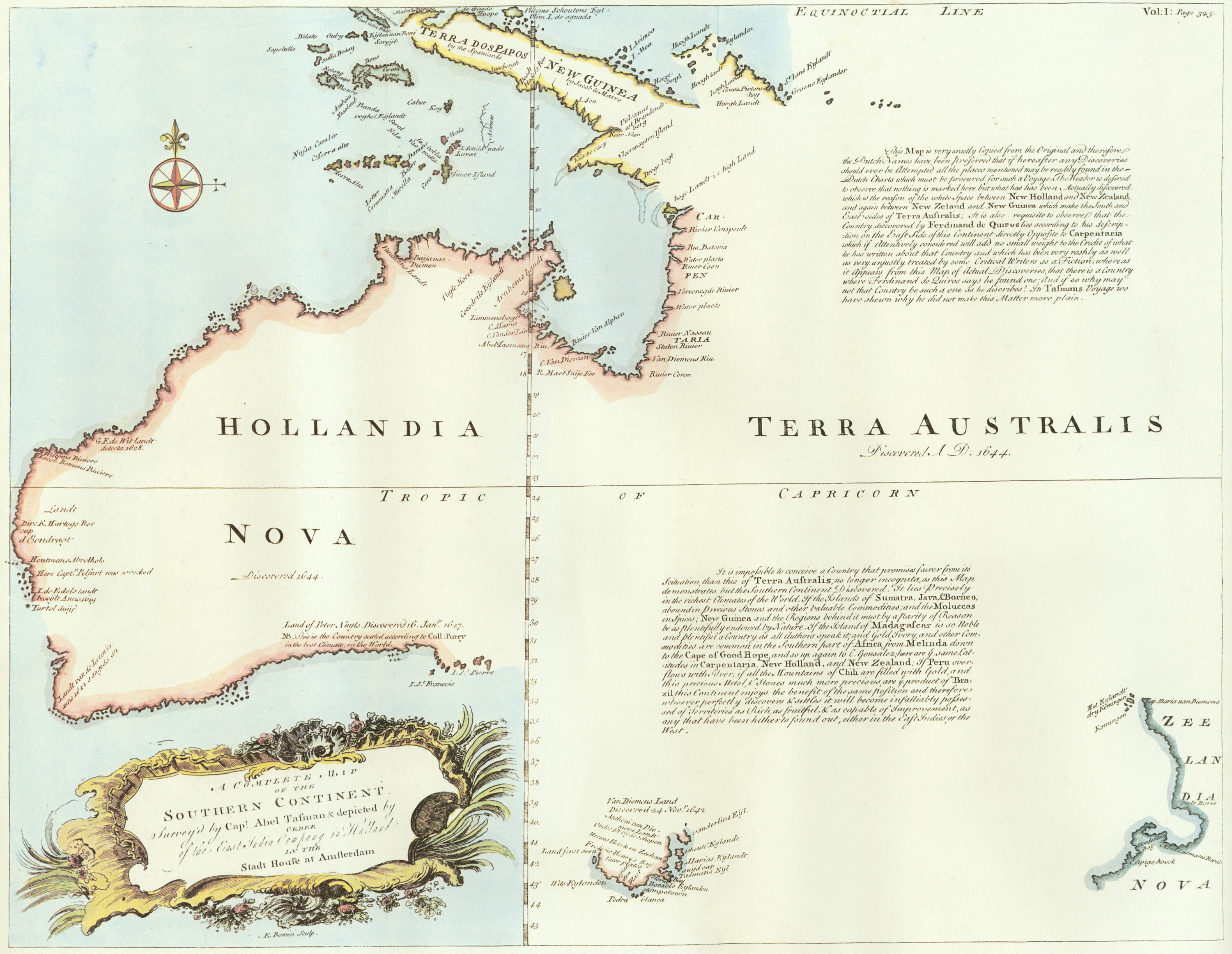
1744 chart of Hollandia Nova – Terra Australis, before Captain Cook had mapped its east coast

Bowen's map, A Complete Map of the Southern Continent survey'd by Capt. Abel Tasman & depicted by order of the East India Company in Holland in the Stadt House at Amsterdam, was essentially a copy of the map Melchisédech Thévenot had published in Relations de divers Voyages curieux (Paris, 1663, v.1).

Although Thévenot said that he had taken his chart from the one inlaid into the floor of the Amsterdam Town Hall, it appears to be an almost exact copy of that of Joan Blaeu in his Archipelagus Orientalis sive Asiaticus published in 1659 in the Kurfürsten Atlas (Atlas of the Great Elector).

The map of the world set into the floor of the great hall of the Amsterdam Town Hall was drawn from Blaeu's world map of 1648. Once Blaeu's map of the world appeared other mapmakers, such as Thévenot, copied his depiction of New Holland. Hollandia Nova in the Kurfürsten Atlas is shown as it appears in Blaeu's world map of 1648. It appears to have been Thévenot who introduced a differentiation between Hollandia Nova to the west and Terre Australe to the east of the meridian corresponding to 135° East of Greenwich, emphasised by the latitude staff running down that meridian, as there is no such division on Blaeu's map.

=== Legend ===
A legend on Bowen's map emphasised the separation between Hollandia Nova and Terra Australis that had been introduced either inadvertently or intentionally by Thévenot when he placed the two names on either side of the latitude staff running down the 135° East of Greenwich meridian. Bowen's map legend identified Terra Australis as the land described by Quirós by saying:

It is also requisite to observe that the Country discovered by Ferdinand de Quiros lies according to his description on the East Side of this Continent directly opposite to Carpentaria which if Attentively considered will add no small weight to the Credit of what he has written about that Country and which has been very rashly as well as very unjustly treated by some Critical Writers as a Fiction; Whereas it Appears from this Map of Actual Discoveries, that there is a Country where Ferdinand de Quiros says he found one: And if so why may not that Country be such a one as he describes?

Another legend added by Bowen to the map called for discovery and settlement of Terra Australis:

It is impossible to conceive a Country that promises fairer from its Scituation, than this of Terra Australis; no longer incognita, as this Map demonstrates, but the Southern Continent Discovered. It lies Precisely in the richest Climates of the World. If the Islands of Sumatra, Java, & Borneo, abound in Precious Stones and other valuable Commodities; and the Moluccas in Spices; New Guinea and the Regions behind it must by a parity of Reason be as plentifully endowed by Nature. If the Island of Madagascar is so Noble and plentiful a Country as all Authors speak it and Gold, Ivory, and other Commodities are common in the Southern part of Africa, from Melinda down to the Cape of Good Hope, and so up again to C. Gonsalez; here are ye same Latitudes in Carpentaria, New Holland, and New Zealand, If Peru overflows with Silver, if all the Mountains of Chili are filled with Gold, and this precious Metal & Stones much more precious are ye product of Brazil; this Continent enjoys the benefit of the same position and therefore whoever perfectly discovers & settles it will become infalliably possessed of Territories as Rich, as fruitful, & as capable of Improvement, as any that have been hitherto found out, either in the East Indies, or the West.

The territorial claim made by Britain when the colony of New South Wales was established in 1788 included all of Australia eastward of the meridian of 135° East dividing New Holland from Terra Australis, as shown on Bowen's map.

== Works ==
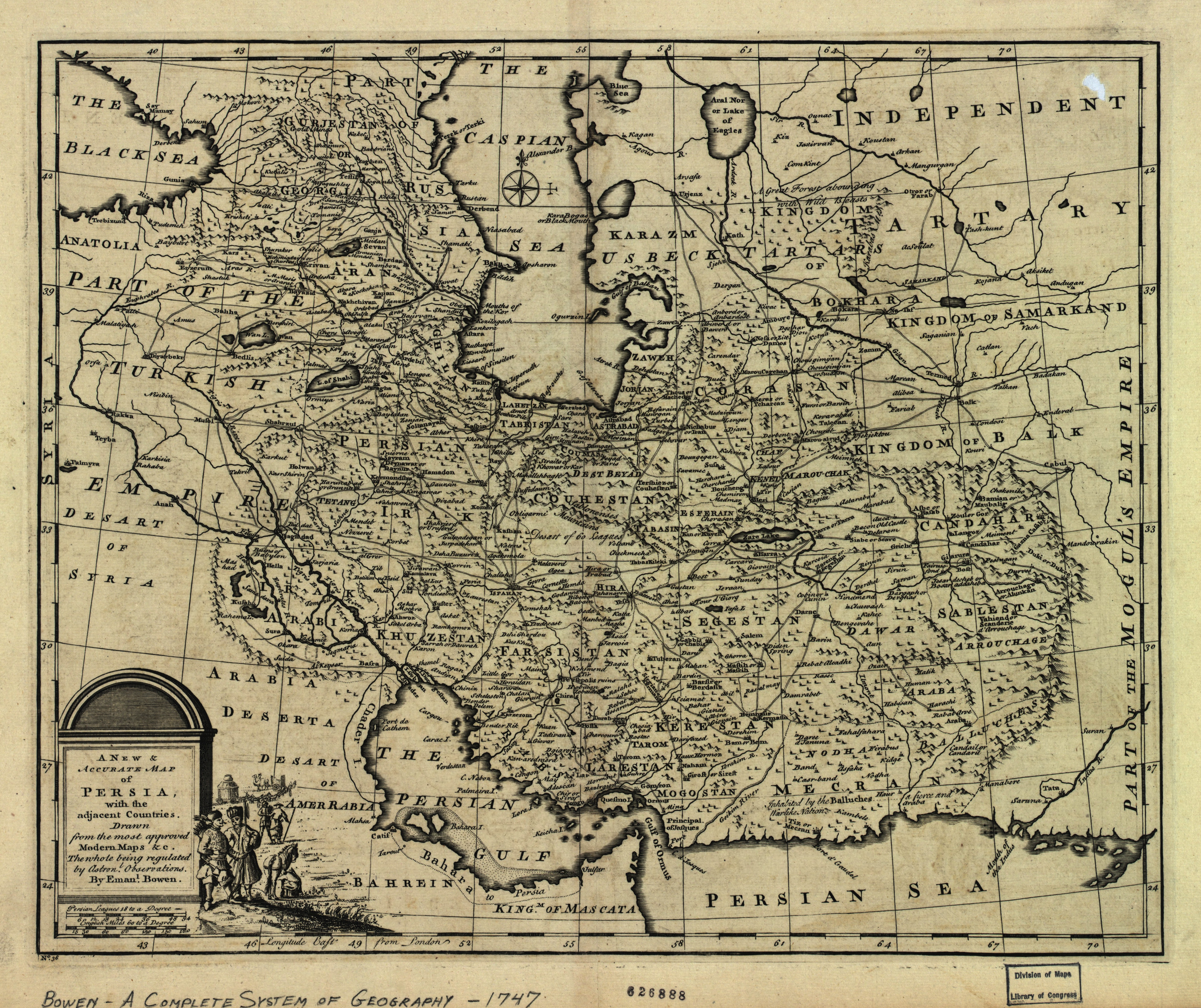
A New & Accurate Map of Persia drawn by Emanuel Bowen in 1747

- c. 1714 Maps of the Continents.
- 1720 (with John Owen) Britannia Depicta or Ogilby Improved.
- 1744–1747 A Complete System of Geography.
- 1744–1748 maps for Complete Collection of Voyages (Harris).
- 1752 Complete Atlas Distinct View of the Known World.
- 1758 (with John Gibson) Atlas Minimus (re-issued 1774 and 1792).
- 1755–1760 (with Thomas Kitchin) The Large English Atlas (1763/1767/1777/1785/1787 further editions and enlargements).
- 1762 (with Thomas Kitchin) The Royal English Atlas 1778/1780 re-issued (1794–1828 re-issued as the English Atlas).
- c. 1763 (with Benjamin Martin) The Natural History of England.
- 1766 Universal History of the World.
- 1767 (with Thomas Bowen) Atlas Anglicanus (re-issued 1777).
- c. 1777 (Thomas Bowen) The World showing the Discoveries of Captain Cook and other Circumnavigators.
- c. 1784 (Thomas Bowen) Maps in Rapkins's History of England.
- A Complete map of the Southern Continent survey'd by Capt. Abel Tasman & depicted by order of the East India Company in Holland in the Stadt House at Amsterdam; E. Bowen, Sculpt.
