= James Barton Bowen =

American politician

James Barton Bowen (c. 1815–1881) was Mayor of Madison, Wisconsin. He held the office from 1871 to 1872. He was also the first homeopathic physician in Dane County, and president of the Park Savings Bank.

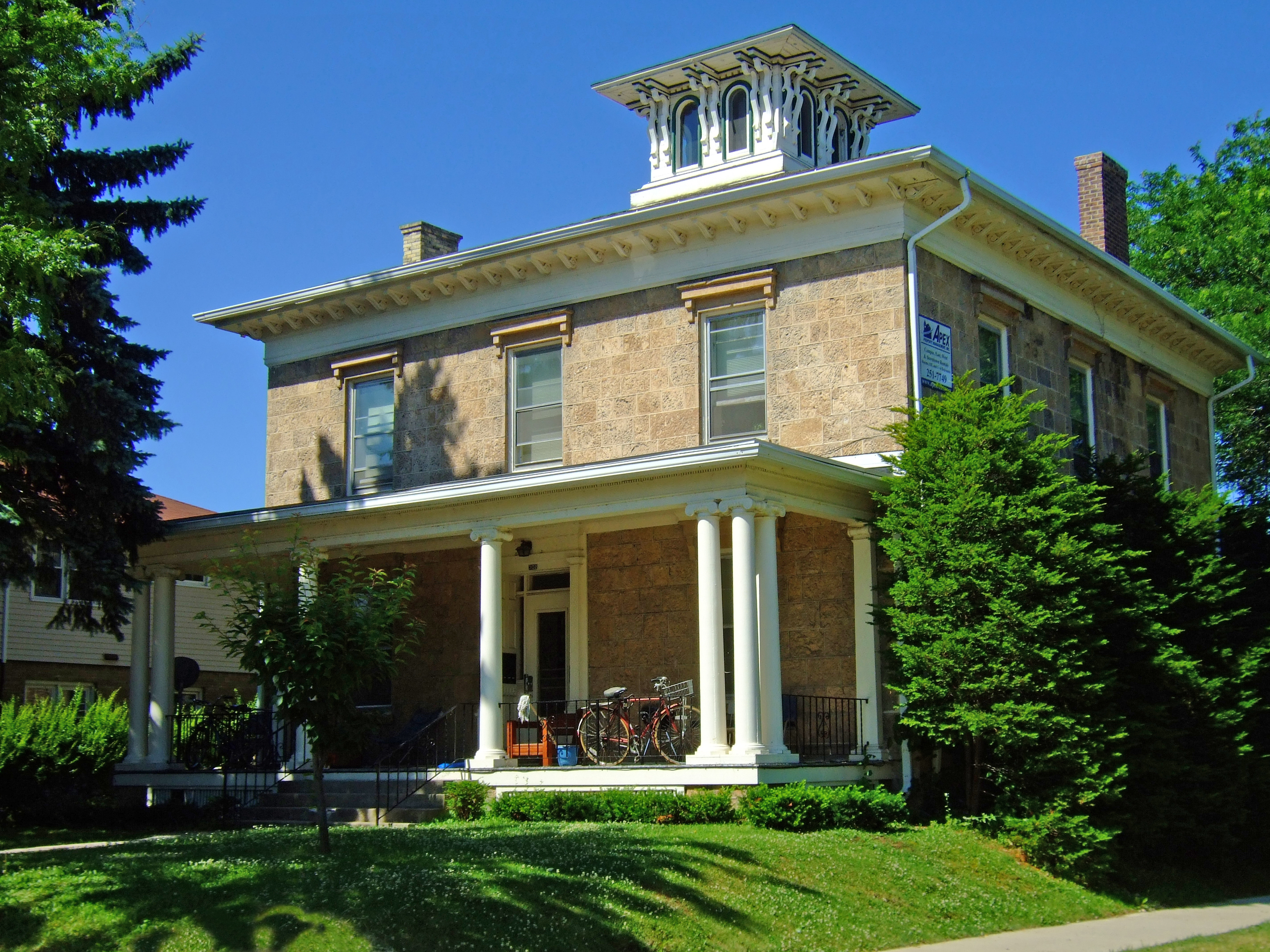
Bowen's home at 302 S. Mills St, just west of Meriter

His former home, now known as the James B. Bowen House, is listed on the National Register of Historic Places.
