= Trevor Bowen (rugby) =

Welsh rugby league footballer

Personal information
- Full name: Trevor Bowen
- Born: unknown
- Died: unknown

Playing information

Rugby union
Club
Years	Team	Pld	T	G	FG	P
	Penygraig RFC

Rugby league
- Position: Stand-off
Club
Years	Team	Pld	T	G	FG	P
1934	Salford
1937–46	Dewsbury
1939	→ Castleford (loan)	1
	Total	1	0	0	0	0

Trevor Bowen was a rugby union and professional rugby league footballer who played in the 1930s and 1940s. He played club level rugby union for Penygraig RFC, and club level rugby league for Salford, Dewsbury and Castleford, as a stand-off.

== Playing career ==
Trevor Bowen changed rugby football codes from rugby union to rugby league when he transferred from Penygraig RFC to Salford, he made his début for Salford during August 1934, he transferred from Salford to Dewsbury, he made his début for Dewsbury during November 1937, he transferred from Dewsbury to Castleford on loan during November 1939, he made his début for Castleford on Saturday 25 November 1939, he returned from loan at Castleford to Dewsbury, and he played his last match for Dewsbury during February 1946.
