= Tommy Bowen (footballer) =

English footballer

Personal information
- Full name: Thomas Bowen
- Date of birth: 9 November 1900
- Place of birth: Greets Green, England
- Date of death: 1954 (aged 53–54)
- Position: Inside forward

Senior career*
Years	Team	Apps	(Gls)
1919–1920	Bush Rangers		
1920–1921	Birmingham	0	(0)
1921–1924	Walsall	74	(17)
1924–1928	Wolverhampton Wanderers	86	(24)
1928–1930	Coventry City	11	(3)
1930	Kidderminster Harriers		
Total		171	(41)
- * Club domestic league appearances and goals

Thomas Bowen (9 November 1900 – 1954) was an English footballer who played in the Football League for Coventry City, Walsall and Wolverhampton Wanderers.
