= Thomas H. Bowen =

Surveyor, architect and land agent in South Australia

Thomas Hopkins Bowen (1850 – 28 April 1896) was a surveyor, architect and land agent in the early days of the Colony of South Australia.

== History ==
Mary Ann Bowen (c. 1827 – 11 August 1888) and Robert George Bowen ( – 17 November 1869), emigrated to South Australia from Britain with their small family aboard the ship Hooghly, arriving in June 1839. He was a builder and contractor in the early days of Adelaide, responsible for the South Australia Company's flour mill at Hackney, the Bank of South Australia on North Terrace and the Supreme Courthouse on Victoria Square. His business was taken over by English & Brown. He then founded a grain store in Waymouth Street, which in 1867 was taken over by John Darling, the foundation of the great J. Darling & Son grain and flour business.

Bowen was born in Adelaide and educated at J. L. Young's Adelaide Educational Institution. On leaving school he found employment as a draughtsman in the Survey Office, where he worked for several years, a demanding job which entailed much surveying work in isolated pastoral areas and finally affected his health, and he resigned from the public service. He spent some time in Britain before returning, and in 1880 joined the partnership of Beresford, Bowen & Black, (Note: Arthur George de la Poer Beresford (1853–1924) and A. Barham Black (1858–1933)) architects, surveyors, and land agents, with offices in the New Exchange. The partnership was dissolved in 1884 Bowen had been appointed attorney to handle (his father-in-law) Walter Duffield's extensive pastoral and business interests, and on the old man's death Bowen, D. Walter Duffield (1851–1922, his only son and another AEI student), and Lieutenant-Colonel Makin (D. W. Duffield's son-in-law) acted as trustees and managers of the estate.

Bowen's wife died, and on 2 February 1892 in England he married again, to Esther Eliza Perry, the elder daughter of Rev. Charles Stuart Perry, at one time rector of St. Jude's Church, Carlton, Victoria.

== Other interests ==
Bowen was

- secretary of the Samaritan Fund, a charity connected with the Adelaide Hospital.
- a regular church-goer, one of the churchwardens of Christ Church, North Adelaide.
- an enthusiastic painter; a member of the Adelaide Easel Club
- secretary of the Adelaide Philharmonic Society.
- a member of the council of the Royal Geographical Society of Australasia

He died at his residence, "Glena", Mill Terrace, North Adelaide, after a cerebral haemorrhage. and was buried at the North Road Cemetery.

== Family ==
Bowen married (Emily) Martha Duffield (1849 – 23 July 1890) on 2 July 1873

He married again, to Esther Eliza Perry ( – ) in Oxford, England, on 2 February 1892. Esther was the eldest daughter of Rev. Charles Stuart Perry of St. Jude's Vicarage, Melbourne. They had two children:

- Esther Gwendolyn Bowen (16 May 1893 – 1970) married James George Calley in 1921
- Thomas Stuart Perry Bowen (1897–1959) was born after the death of his father. He married Mary Gladys "Mollie" Clampett on 14 August 1920

Bowen had one brother, Henry Bowen, and three sisters: Harriett Bowen married Frederick W. Bullock on 23 September 1873; Amelia Bowen (c. 1855 – 15 July 1922) married Robert Kyffin Thomas on 6 January 1876; and Ada Alice Bowen married George Sutherland on 25 September 1882.
