= David Bowen (pathologist) =

Welsh pathologist

Professor David Bowen FRCP FRCPE FRCPath

Professor of Forensic Medicine, University of London
- In office 1977–1989

Personal details
- Born: David Aubrey Llewellyn Bowen; 31 January 1924
- Died: 31 March 2011 (aged 87)

David Aubrey Llewellyn Bowen (31 January 1924 – 31 March 2011) was a Welsh pathologist. He studied medicine at Corpus Christi College, Cambridge. He was involved in the Dennis Nilsen case, and also that of John Duffy and David Mulcahy, the murder of PC Keith Blakelock and the death of the financier Roberto Calvi.

== In popular culture ==
Bowen was portrayed by Jonathan Coy in Des, a 2020 docudrama focusing on Dennis Nilsen.
