= John W. Bowen (U.S. Army general) =

U.S. Army general

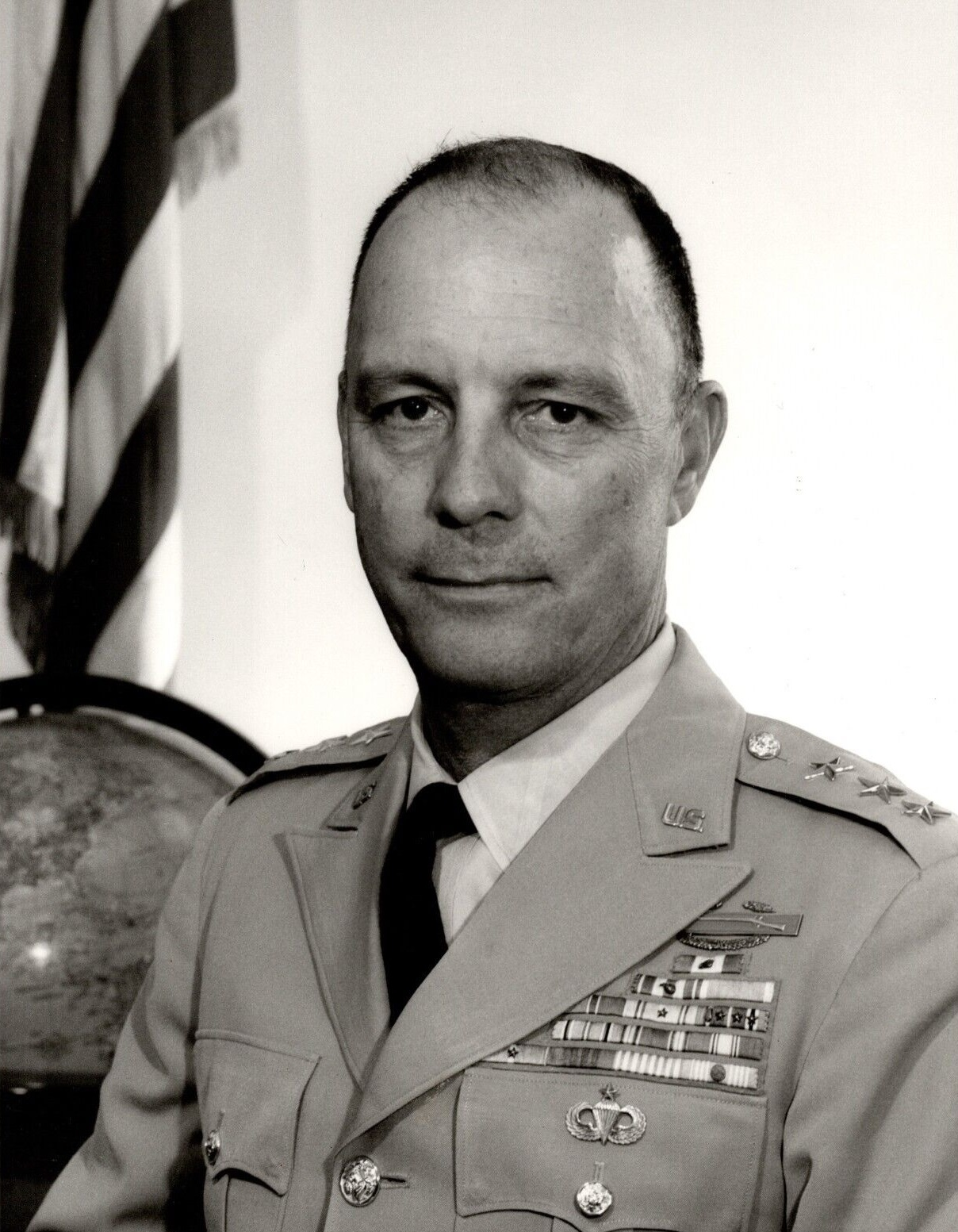
- Bowen as a lieutenant general, probably while commanding XVIII Airborne Corps in 1964
- Born: July 3, 1910; Pettit Barracks, Zamboanga City, Philippines
- Died: August 18, 1977 (aged 67); San Francisco, California, U.S.
- Burial place: San Francisco National Cemetery
- Education: Georgia Military Academy; United States Military Academy; National War College
- Spouse(s): Elizabeth Whitthorne Judd (m. 1933–1960) Renée Victoria de Marguenat (m. 1961–1977)
- Children: 2
- Military career
- Service: Organized Reserve Corps; United States Army
- Service years: 1927–1928 (Reserve); 1932–1968 (Army)
- Rank: Lieutenant General
- Service number: O18904
- Unit: U.S. Army Infantry Branch
- Commands: Company I, 25th Infantry Regiment; Company A, 27th Infantry Regiment; Company A, 26th Infantry Regiment; 3rd Battalion, 26th Infantry Regiment; 26th Infantry Regiment; 82nd Airborne Division; Third United States Army; XVIII Airborne Corps
- Wars: World War II; Korean War
- Awards: Army Distinguished Service Medal (4); Silver Star (2); Legion of Merit; Bronze Star Medal; Croix de Guerre (France); Order of Military Merit (South Korea); Republic of Korea Presidential Unit Citation; Combat Infantryman Badge; Senior Parachutist Badge
- Other work: Chief of Administrative Services, Golden Gate Regional Center

John W. Bowen (July 3, 1910 – August 18, 1977) was a career officer in the United States Army. A veteran of World War II and the Korean War, he served in the Organized Reserve Corps from 1927 to 1928, and in the army from 1932 to 1968, and he attained the rank of lieutenant general. His commands included the 26th Infantry Regiment (1943), 82nd Airborne Division (1956–1957), Third United States Army (1964), and XVIII Airborne Corps (1964–1965). Among his awards and decorations were four awards of the Army Distinguished Service Medal, Silver Star (2), Legion of Merit, Bronze Star Medal, Croix de Guerre (France), Order of Military Merit (South Korea), Republic of Korea Presidential Unit Citation, Combat Infantryman Badge, and Senior Parachutist Badge.

== Early life ==
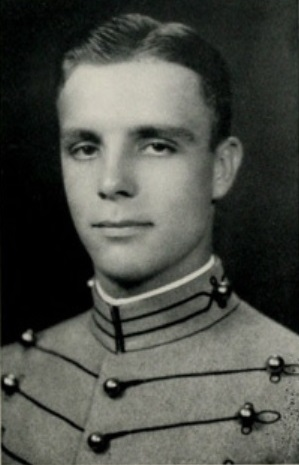
Bowen's senior class photo from the 1932 West Point yearbook

John William Bowen was born at Pettit Barracks in Zamboanga City, Philippines on July 3, 1910, the son of Colonel Burton E. Bowen and Edith (Moore) Bowen. He was educated at various military posts as his family traveled for his father's career, including Oak Park, Illinois, and he graduated from Georgia Military Academy (later known as Woodward Academy) as valedictorian in 1928. Bowen joined the Organized Reserve Corps as a private in 1927, and served until beginning attendance at the United States Military Academy (West Point).

Bowen's status as a military preparatory school honor graduate enabled him to obtain a 1928 at-large appointment to West Point, and he graduated in 1932 ranked 253 of 262. He received his commission as a second lieutenant and was assigned to the Infantry Branch.

== Start of career ==
After receiving his commission, Bowen was assigned to the 20th Infantry Regiment at Fort Francis E. Warren, Wyoming. He was promoted to first lieutenant in 1935, and served at Fort Warren until 1936. From August 1936 to June 1937, he attended the Infantry Officers Course, after which he was assigned to command Company I, 25th Infantry Regiment at Fort Huachuca, Arizona.

From September to November 1937, Bowen served on temporary duty at Fort Sam Houston, Texas as commander of a truck company in the motorized quartermaster battalion of the experimental 2nd Infantry Division as it developed doctrine for mechanized units configured as triangular divisions. In January 1939, Bowen departed for Schofield Barracks, Hawaii, where he commanded Company A, 27th Infantry Regiment. He was promoted to captain in September 1940.

== Continued career ==
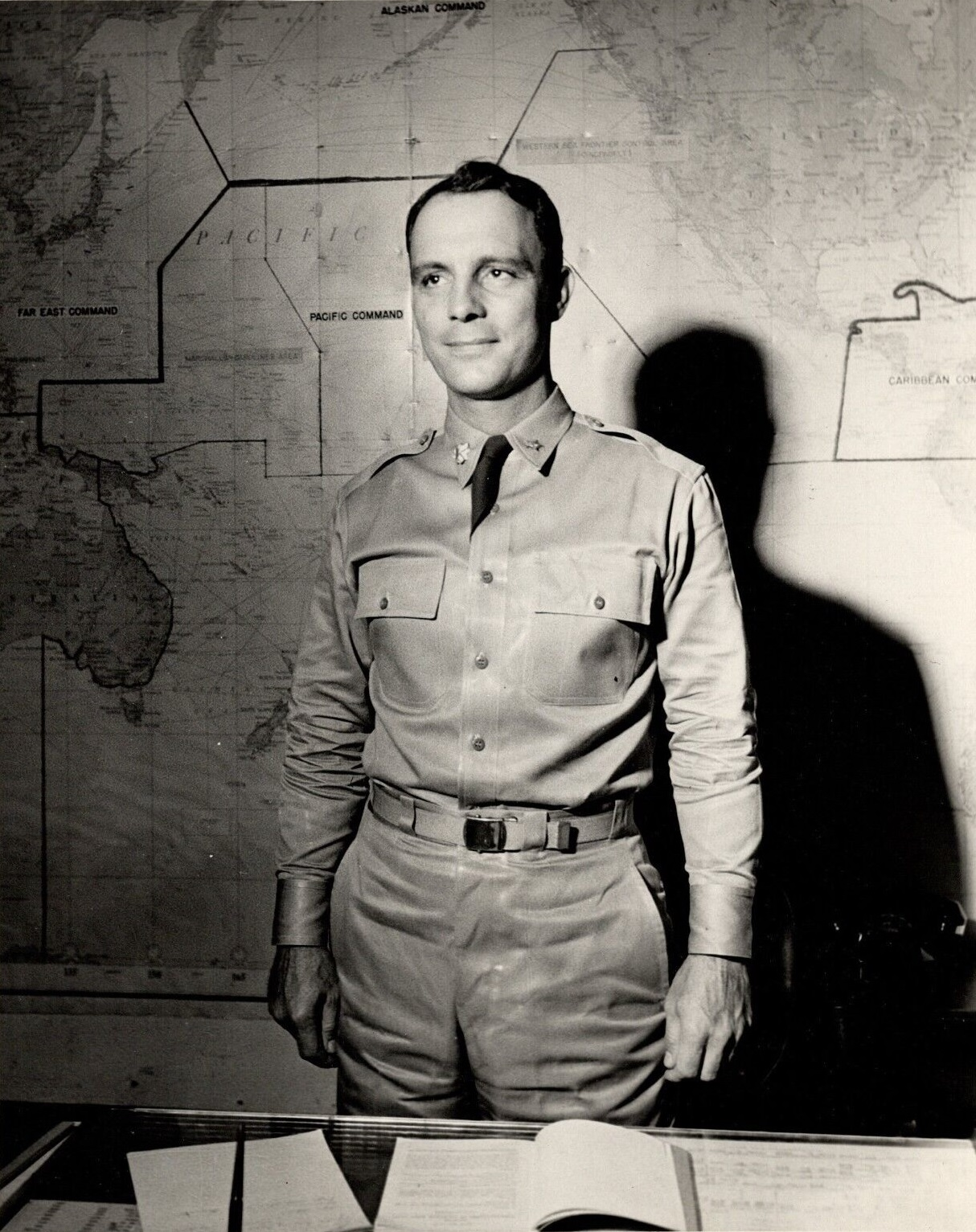
Bowen as a lieutenant colonel, probably while serving as Secretary of the Army General Staff in 1948

Bowen was in command of his company when the United States entered World War II, and he was promoted to major on February 1, 1942. He served as executive officer of 3rd Battalion, 26th Infantry Regiment until September, when he was promoted to lieutenant colonel and assigned to command the battalion. He was in command during Operation Torch in late 1942, when his battalion was part of the U.S. force that attacked Oran, Algeria, then occupied by Vichy France and Nazi Germany. In March 1943, he assumed command of the 26th Infantry Regiment, and in April he was promoted to colonel. Bowen led the regiment during the Tunisian campaign and Allied invasion of Sicily, then moved to England, where the regiment reorganized and retrained in anticipation of taking part in the June 1944 Normandy landings.

Bowen became ill while in England, which required a sustained period of convalescence, so in December 1943 he returned to the United States, where he was hospitalized until May 1944. After recovering, he joined the Operations section of the general staff at the War Department, where he served until May 1945, when he was assigned to the Office of the Military Aide to the President. In November 1945, Bowen was assigned as Secretary of the Army General Staff. In July 1948, he reverted to his permanent rank of lieutenant colonel.

As a result of his wartime service, Bowen received equivalent credit for completion of the United States Army Command and General Staff College and Armed Forces Staff College. In August 1948, he began attendance at the National War College, from which he graduated in June 1949. Bowen was then assigned as Plans and Operations staff officer for United States Caribbean Command, where he served from 1948 to 1951. He was promoted to permanent colonel in September 1950. From 1951 to 1953, Bowen was an instructor at the National War College.

== Later career ==
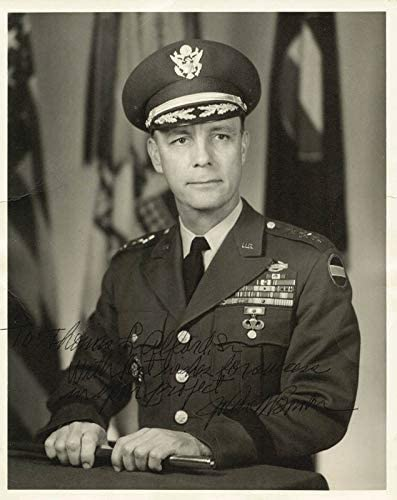
Autographed photo of Bowen as deputy commander of Continental Army Command, circa 1963

In 1953, Bowen was assigned to Korean War duty as deputy chief of staff for administration (G-1) for Eighth United States Army in South Korea, and he was promoted to brigadier general in October 1953. From 1955 to 1956 he served as assistant chief of staff (J-3) for the U.S. Far East Command. In 1956, he served as assistant division commander of the 101st Airborne Division.

In September 1956, Bowen was assigned as commander of the 82nd Airborne Division, and he was promoted to major general in December. In October 1957, Bowen was assigned to the army staff as assistant chief of staff for Reserve Components. In 1961, he was appointed director of the Military Assistance Division at United States European Command in Paris.

In 1963, Bowen was promoted to lieutenant general and appointed deputy commander of Continental Army Command. He acted as commander of Third United States Army in 1964, and from 1964 to 1965 he commanded XVIII Airborne Corps. From 1965 until his 1968 retirement, Bowen was chief of staff for U.S. European Command.

== Retirement and death ==
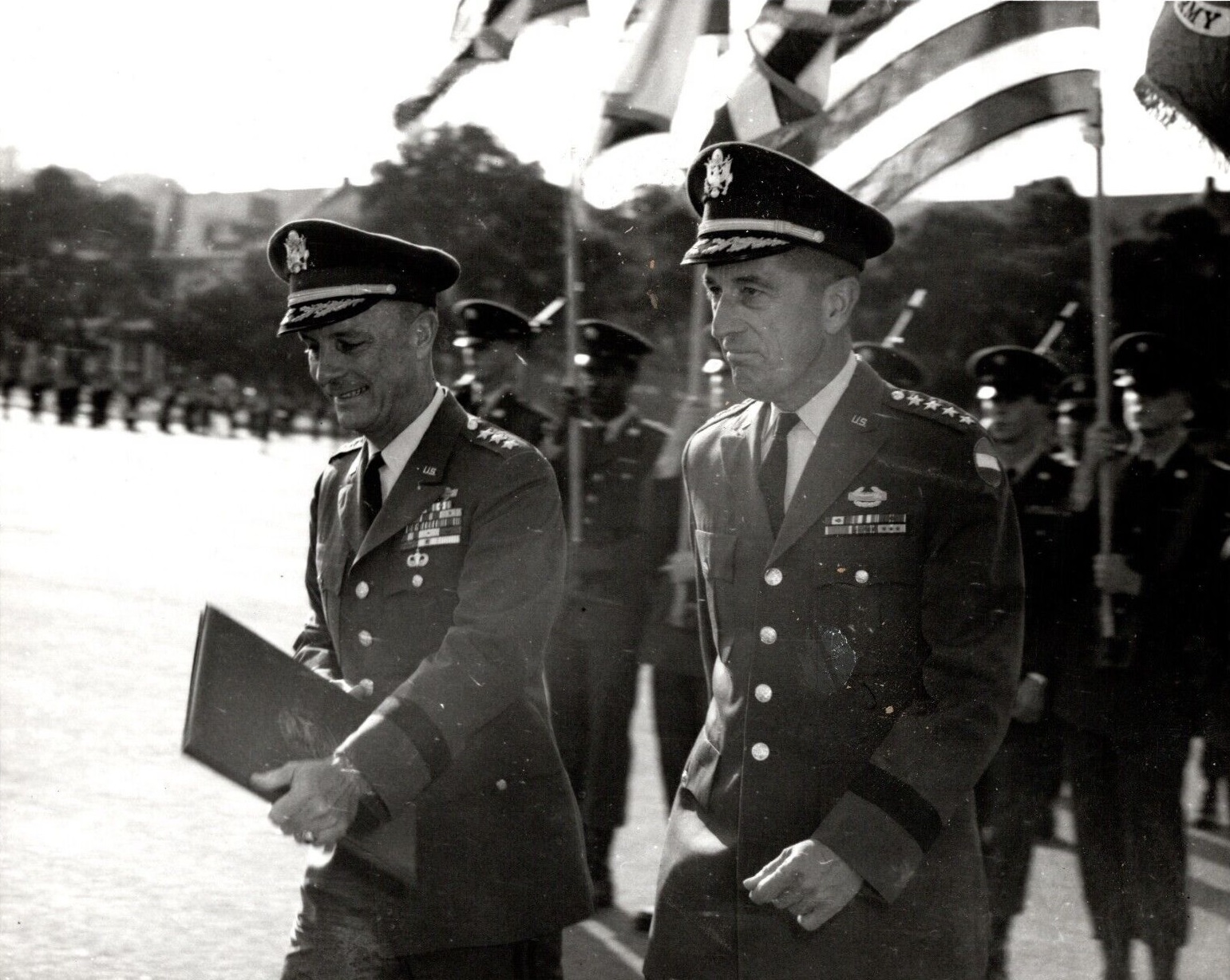
Bowen (left) at his 1968 retirement ceremony, escorted by General James K. Woolnough

In retirement, Bowen was a resident of San Francisco, and later of Tiburon, California, and was the longtime head of administrative services for Golden Gate Regional Center, a San Francisco social services agency. He died in San Francisco on August 18, 1977. Bowen was buried at San Francisco National Cemetery.

== Awards and decorations ==
=== Military awards ===
Bowen's awards and decorations included: Army Distinguished Service Medal with three oak leaf clusters; Silver Star with oak leaf cluster; Legion of Merit; Bronze Star Medal; Croix de Guerre (France); Order of Military Merit (South Korea); Republic of Korea Presidential Unit Citation; Combat Infantryman Badge; and Senior Parachutist Badge.

=== Civilian awards ===
In 1967, Bowen received Woodward Academy's Outstanding Alumni of the Year award.

== Family ==
In 1933, Bowen married Elizabeth Whitthorne Judd (d. 2001), who was a well-known landscape painter. They were the parents of two daughters, Elizabeth and Evelyn. John and Elizabeth Bowen divorced around 1960, (Note: Sources from the late 1950s indicated that John and Elizabeth Bowen were still married. John Bowen remarried in 1961, which places his divorce from his first wife in the 1958 to 1960 timeframe.) and in 1961, he married Renée Victoria de Marguenat, who survived him.
