= John Eliot Bowen =

American author

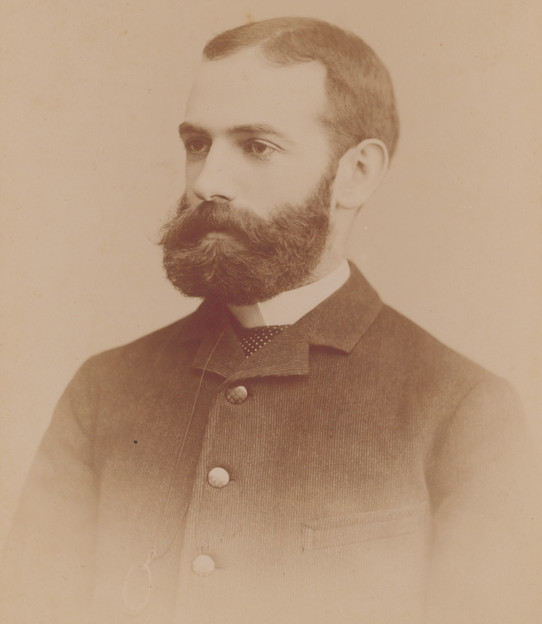
- Born: June 8, 1858; Brooklyn, New York
- Died: January 3, 1890 (aged 31); Brooklyn, New York
- Resting place: Green-Wood Cemetery
- Education: Yale University (1881); Columbia College (1886)
- Occupation: Author
- Parent(s): Henry Chandler Bowen; Lucy Maria Tappan

John Eliot Bowen (June 8, 1858 – January 3, 1890) was an American writer.

== Early life ==
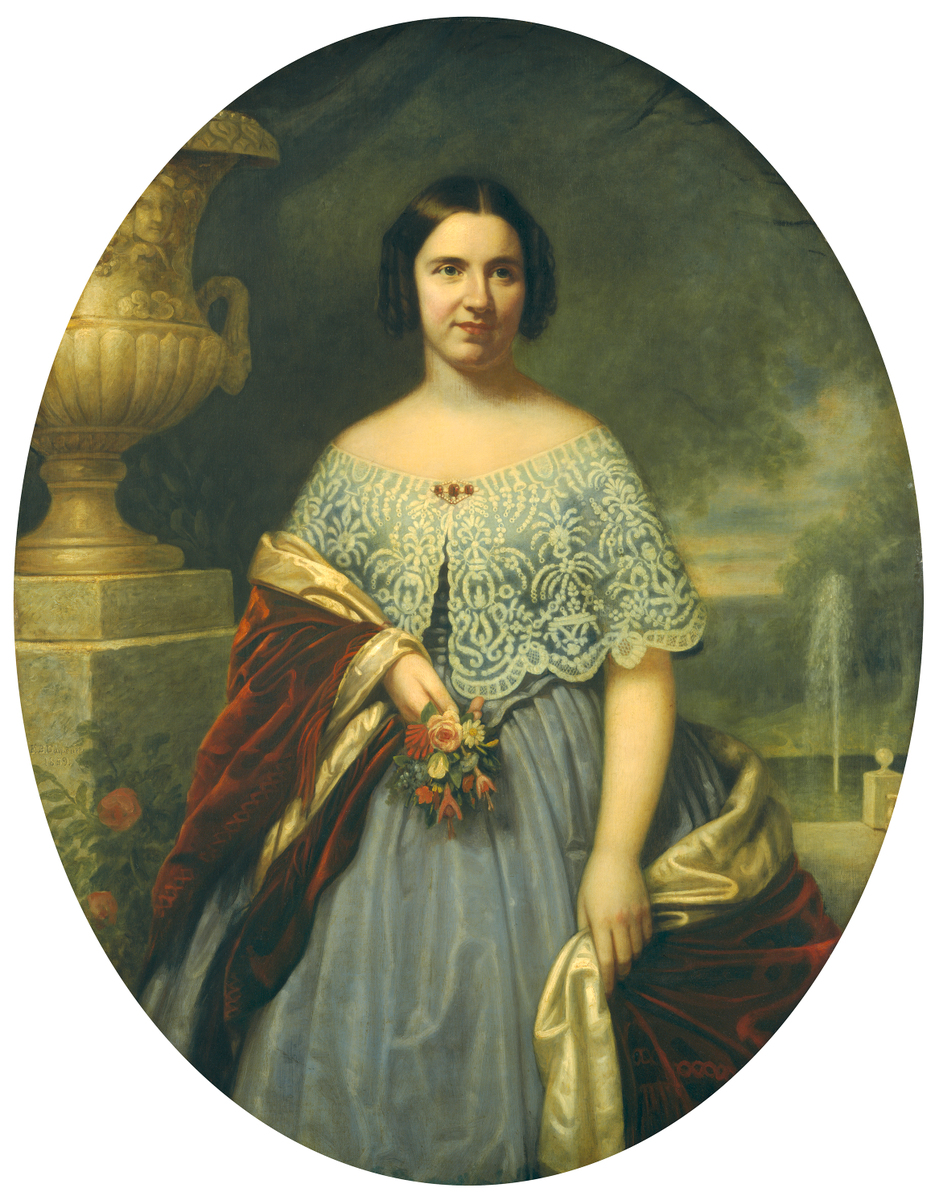
Portrait of his mother, Lucy Tappan Bowen, by Francis Bicknell Carpenter, 1859, at the National Gallery of Art

John Elliot Bowen was born on June 8, 1858, in Brooklyn, N. Y. He was the fifth of seven sons born to Henry Chandler Bowen (1813–1896) and Lucy Maria Tappan (1825–1863). He was a direct descendant, on his father's side, from the Apostle Eliot, whose name he bore. On his mother's side, he was a great-grandnephew of Benjamin Franklin.

His elder brother was Clarence Winthrop Bowen (1852–1935).

Bowen graduated from Yale College in 1881.

== Career ==
On July 16, 1881, he sailed with his brother Herbert Wolcott Bowen (1856–1927) on the SS City of Chester for a year of travel in Europe, and other countries, including Egypt, going up the Nile into Nubia, Palestine, Syria and Constantinople. He then studied for a few months in Germany.

After his return to America became a member of the editorial staff of The Independent, in special charge of its literary correspondence and enterprise. At the same time he pursued a course of study in political science in Columbia College, where he received the degree of Doctor of Philosophy in 1886, presenting a thesis on "The Conflict between the East and West in Egypt," which was published afterwards.

In 1888, he also published a volume of poetical translations of Carmen Sylva's Songs of Toil.

In 1888, Bowen visited Washington, D.C., with his father, mother, sister Grace Aspinwall Bowen (1850–1940), his fiancé Ethel, and cousin Fanny Lincoln to watch the inauguration of Benjamin Harrison as President of the United States. After the inauguration, there was a small informal reception at the White House that Bowen attended. Purportedly, the families of the Cabinet officers did not know each another and because Bowen did know most of them, he acted the part of introducer for the officers as well as for the President and his wife.

== Personal life ==
On January 3, 1890, in his 32rd year of life, he died in Brooklyn, after six weeks' illness, of typhoid fever. His death was particularly sad, as the previous evening had been fixed as the date of his marriage to Ethel.
