= David Bowen (cricketer) =

English cricketer

Personal information
- Full name: David Michael Bowen
- Born: 3 October 1971 (age 55); Enfield, London, England
- Batting: Right-handed

Domestic team information
- Years: Team
- 1999–2000: Middlesex Cricket Board

Career statistics
Competition	LA
Matches	3
Runs scored	63
Batting average	21.00
100s/50s	–/–
Top score	29
Catches/stumpings	–/–
- Source: Cricinfo, 20 November 2010

David Michael Bowen (born 3 October 1971) is a former English cricketer. Bowen was a right-handed batsman. He was born in Edmonton, London.

Bowen represented the Middlesex Cricket Board in 3 List A matches. These came against Cumberland in the 1999 NatWest Trophy and Wiltshire and Sussex in the 2000 NatWest Trophy. In his 3 List A matches, he scored 63 runs at a batting average of 21.00, with a high score of 29.
