= John Templeton Bowen =

American dermatologist

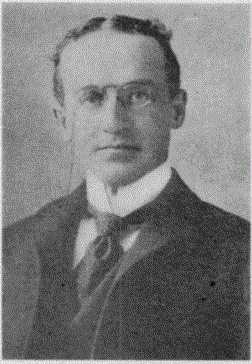
- Born: July 8, 1857
- Died: December 3, 1940 (aged 83)
- Education: Harvard University
- Medical career
- Profession: physician and professor
- Institutions: Massachusetts General Hospital (1887–1927); Harvard Medical School (1896–1911)
- Sub-specialties: dermatology

John Templeton Bowen (July 8, 1857 – December 3, 1940) was an American dermatologist. He was a professor of dermatology at Massachusetts General Hospital.

Bowen obtained his doctoral degree in medical sciences from the Harvard University in 1884. From 1884 to 1887, he pursued postgraduate studies in Berlin, Munich, and Vienna. He joined Massachusetts General Hospital in 1889 as an assistant in the skin diseases department.

In 1907 he became a professor of dermatology at Harvard Medical School. During his time at Harvard, he was elected president of the American Society of Dermatology.

Bowen's disease and bowenoid papulosis are named after him.
