= Dave Bowen (Australian footballer) =

Australian rules footballer

Personal information
- Full name: Dave Bowen
- Born: 14 March 1886
- Died: 2 August 1946 (aged 60)
- Original team: Goldfields Association

Playing career^{1}
Years	Club	Games (Goals)
1908	South Melbourne	1 (0)
- ^{1} Playing statistics correct to the end of 1908.

Dave Bowen (14 March 1886 – 2 August 1946) was an Australian rules footballer who played with South Melbourne in the Victorian Football League (VFL).

Bowen was granted a permit from Subiaco in Western Australia to South Melbourne at the start of the 1908 VFL season but only made a single appearance before returning to Western Australia.
