= John J. Bowen Jr. =

American businessman (born 1955)

- Born: 1955 (age 70–71)
- Occupation: Businessman
- Title: Founder & CEO of CEG Worldwide, LLC; Former CEO of Assante Capital; Former CEO of Reinhardt Woba Bowen Advisory Services (For 8 years); Co-founder of AESNATION.COM

John J. Bowen Jr. (born 1955) is an American businessman and the founder and CEO of CEG Worldwide. He is known for his financial services publications to the public including, The Prudent Investor's Guide to Beating Wall Street at Its Own Game (with Dan Goldie), and Breaking Through: Building a World-Class Wealth Management Business.

== Early career ==
Bowen then began his career in wealth management, working as a financial advisor. With partners, he launched Reinhardt Werba Bowen Advisory Services where Bowen served as CEO for eight years. Bowen then became CEO of Assante Capital.

== Schwab and independent financial advisors ==
In 1991, the Charles Schwab Corporation began working with independent financial advisors, partnering with them to use Schwab as the place to implement their clients’ investment transactions. The initiative was launched with a national advertising campaign. The following year, Schwab rolled out a new "fund-of-funds" marketplace and began giving advice to clients. This was seen to be a violation of the unwritten agreement Schwab had with the independent financial advisors. Reinhardt Werba Bowen, was one of Schwab's biggest financial advisor clients at that time with more than $1 Billion under management. Working with Harold Evensky, who was head of Schwab's institutional advisory board and council, Bowen led the discussions with David Pottruck. Schwab ultimately made amends by creating a facilitated referral service for their customers that matched them to preselected independent financial advisors.

== CEG Worldwide ==
Bowen founded CEG Worldwide, LLC in 2000. It is a financial advisor coaching, research and consulting firm based in San Martin, CA. Bowen's mission was to build on his knowledge of the financial services industry for the benefit of financial advisors and the institutions that work with advisors. One of his priorities was high-quality empirical data and the company is noted for its research and analysis reports. Bowen provided financial advisors with services that included access to pragmatic business experience that "helped them focus on the cutting edge of best practices, now increasingly known as wealth management."

== AES Nation ==
Bowen is the co-founder of AESNATION.com, an online community of entrepreneurs balancing success with making a difference in the world. There, he hosts the recurring podcast, "Accelerating Entrepreneurial Success." Bowen is also founder of Financial Advisor Select, an organization that matches customers with vetted financial advisors in their communities.

== Publications ==
- · The Prudent Investor's Guide to Beating the Market, (1995) [null John J. Bowen], Alan Werba and Carl H. Reinhardt Irwin Professional Publishing, Burr Ridge, Illinois. ISBN 0786303654
- · Creating Equity: How to Build a Hugely Successful Asset Management Business, (1997) John J. Bowen; SDP Publications, East Bridgewater, Massachusetts. ISBN 0914470884
- · The Prudent Investor's Guide to Beating Wall Street at Its Own Game, (2nd edition, 1998) John J. Bowen, Dan Goldie; McGraw-Hill, New York. ISBN 0070527601
- · Realizing the Opportunity: Your Roadmap to Incorporating Investment and Insurance Services Into Your CPA Practice, (2002) John J. Bowen, Douglas D. Wright, Russ Alan Prince; Volume 193 of Journal of Accountancy.
- · Building Powerful Strategic Alliances, (2010) John J. Bowen, Paul Brunswick, Jonathan J. Powell; CEG Publications, California. ISBN 9781626756922
- · Breaking Through: Building a World-Class Wealth Management Business, (2nd edition, 2013) John J. Bowen, Paul Brunswick, Jonathan J. Powell; CEG Publications, California. ISBN 0984853766
- · The Wealth Management Edge: Unlocking the Wealth-Building Secrets of America's Most Successful Affluent Families, (2013) John J. Bowen; TKO Associates, New York. ISBN 098485374X
