= Sir Albert Bowen, 1st Baronet =

British businessman (1858–1924)

Sir Albert Bowen Bt
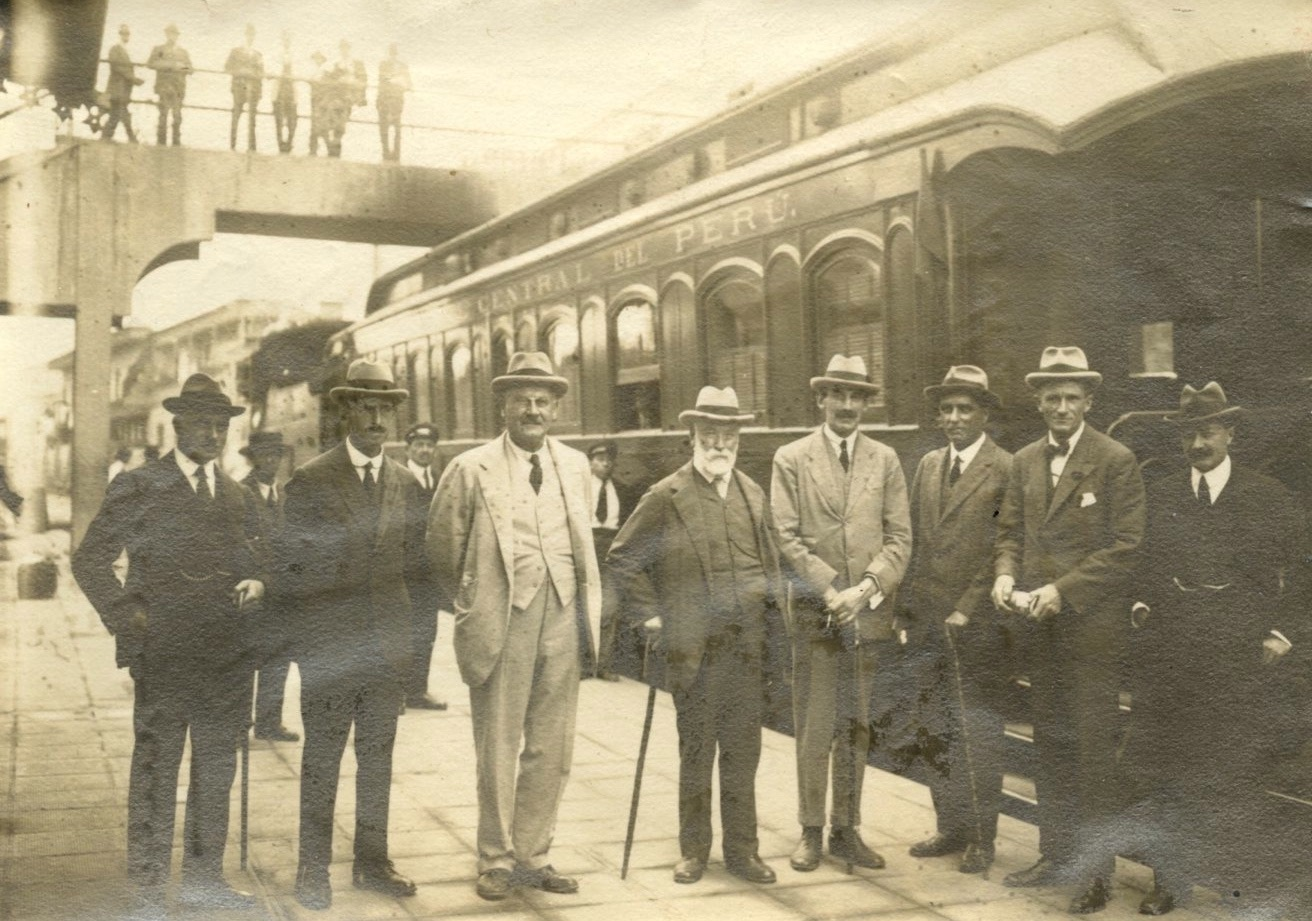
- Sir Albert Bowen (in white suit) at the railway terminus in Lima, Peru, 1923

Chairman of the Buenos Aires Great Southern Railway
- In office 1916 – 19 September 1924

Personal details
- Born: Albert Edward Bowen; November 1858 Hanley, Staffordshire, England
- Died: 19 September 1924 (aged 65)
- Spouse: Alice Anita Crowther
- Children: Winifred Ada Bowen, Gertrude Dorothy Bowen, Evelyn Constance Bowen, Major Sir Edward Crowther Bowen, 2nd Baronet, and Harold Cedric Bowen

Sir Albert Edward Bowen, 1st Baronet (November 1858 – 19 September 1924) was an English businessman who spent much of his life in Argentina.

== Early life ==
Bowen was born in Hanley, Staffordshire. His family emigrated to British North America when he was a boy and he was educated at Upper Canada College in Toronto.

== Career ==
At the age of twenty-one, he moved to Buenos Aires, Argentina, and entered business, rapidly becoming successful and wealthy.

In 1895, he returned to England, intending to retire and enjoy his fortune. However, he soon returned to work, joining the board of Wilson, Sons & Co, coal merchants. He took more directorships, until he sat on the board of eight companies, most of them associated with Argentina, including the Buenos Aires Great Southern Railway and the Buenos Aires Western Railway. He joined the board of the Buenos Aires Great Southern Railway in 1908 and became chairman in 1916, holding the post until his death. He continued to pay periodical visits to Argentina, where his great knowledge of the country and fluency in Spanish were great assets to his companies. He was attributed with the construction of the Buenos Aires/Chile railway line over the Andes.

He was high sheriff of Bedfordshire in 1910–1911. During the First World War he served on many government committees.

For his many services to his country and to business, Bowen was created a baronet in the 1921 New Year Honours.

== Personal life ==
On 24 April 1884, Bowen married Alice Anita Crowther. They had five children: Winifred Ada Bowen, Gertrude Dorothy Bowen, Evelyn Constance Bowen, Major Sir Edward Crowther Bowen, 2nd Baronet, and Harold Cedric Bowen. Their eldest daughter, Winifred, married Alexander Cobbe, an officer in the Indian Army and a recipient of the Victoria Cross. Their second daughter, Gertrude, married the diplomat Sir Kinahan Cornwallis.

== See also ==
- Bowen baronets

== Footnotes ==
Baronetage of the United Kingdom
New creation	Baronet (of Colworth); 1921–1924	Succeeded by Edward Bowen
