= Thomas Bowen (Independent minister) =

Welsh clergyman (1756 -1827)

Thomas Bowen (1756–1827) was a Welsh Independent minister. He began work as a farm worker at an early age, but also attended lessons given by John Griffiths (1731–1811) of Glandŵr, which enabled him in 1777 to join Abergavenny Academy. His call to move to Maes-yr-Onnen in 1781 livened up the local church considerably. He then began extending his influence, preaching and establishing new churches in the Llansantffraid area. After moving to Maes-yr-Haf chapel, Neath, in 1795 he also established new churches in Melin-Cwrt and Aberavon.

He died 27 February 1827.
