= Thomas Bowen (engraver) =

Thomas Bowen (died 1790) was a Welsh engraver of charts. He was the son of Emanuel Bowen (1693/4–1767), map engraver to George II and Louis XV.

He died in Clerkenwell workhouse early in 1790.

== Works ==
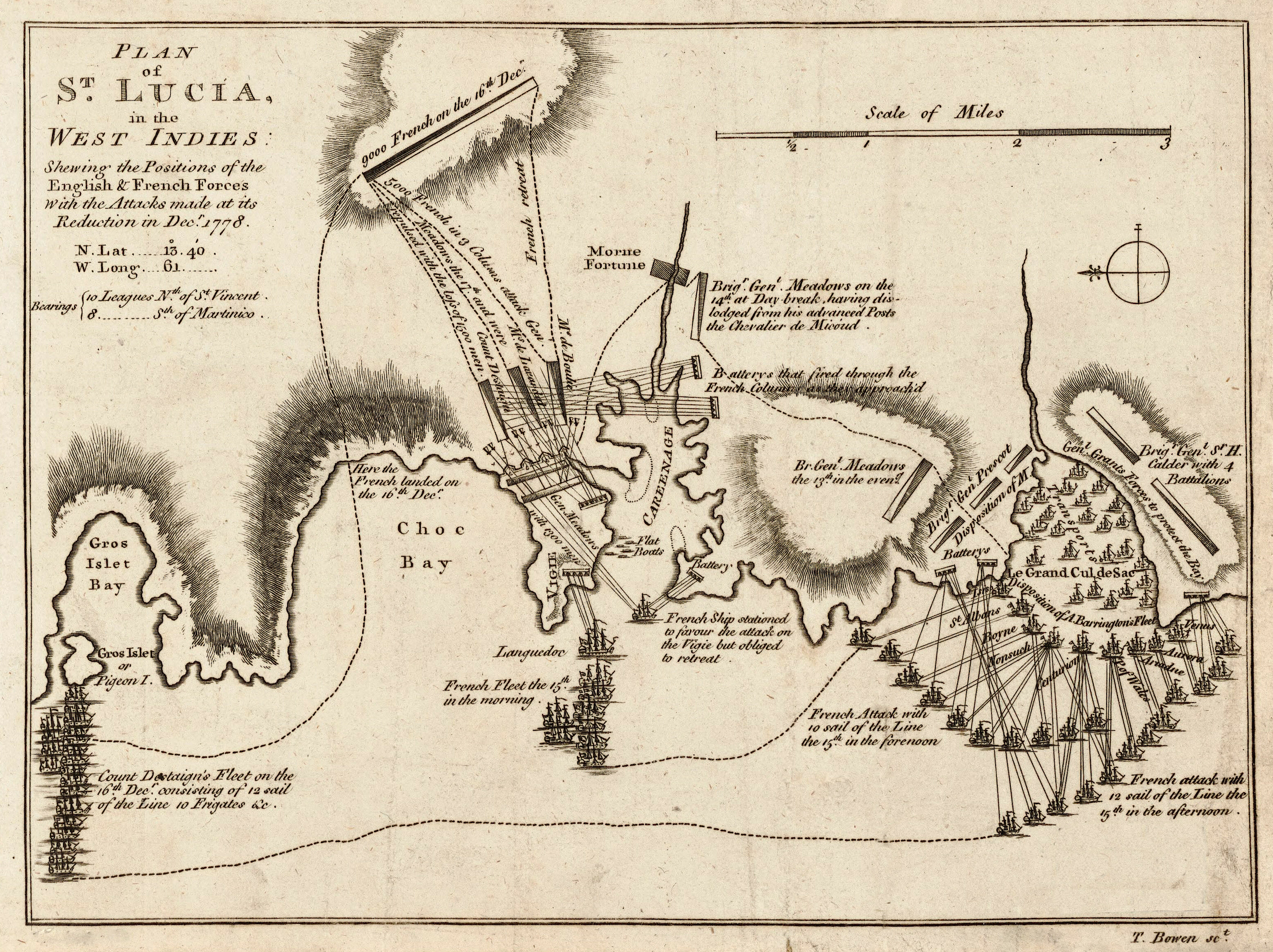
Bowen's engraving of the Battle of St Lucia in December 1778

He engraved:

- the maps and charts of the West Indies, published by the direction of the government from the surveys of Captain James Speer;
- maps of the country twenty miles round London and of the road between London and St. David's, about 1750;
- a 'New Projection of the Eastern and Western Hemispheres of the Earth,' 1776; and
- an 'Accurate Map of the Russian Empire in Europe and Asia,' 1778.
- "A New & Accurate Map Of Europe From The Latest Improvements And Regulated By Astronomical Observations", engraved for Mountague's History of England.
- An 'English map of Persia and the Garden of Eden,' 1780

He contributed to George Taylor and Andrew Skinner's Survey and Maps of the Roads of North Britain in 1776.
