= David Squires (cartoonist) =

Australian cartoonist

- Born: 4 November 1974 (age 52); Swindon, Wiltshire, England
- Occupations: Cartoonist; Illustrator

David Squires is a British-Australian cartoonist, whose work appears in The Guardian, L'Équipe and other publications.

== Work ==
Squires's first published work was in the Swindon Town fanzine, The 69er, as a teenager, about Duncan Shearer's departure from Swindon Town to Blackburn Rovers in 1992.

During his time in England, Squires was commissioned to design Rockin' Robin, Swindon Town's mascot. He also designed Herbie the Hammer, a West Ham United mascot.

His book The Illustrated History of Football was published by Penguin in 2016. In May 2017, Squires began a weekly strip covering the UK general election for The Guardian. In the German football magazine 11 Freunde he has a monthly comic strip about the shenanigans of today's pro football.

== Personal life ==
Squires relocated from London, England, to Sydney, Australia, in 2009. He announced in November 2022 that he had become an Australian citizen.

== Books ==
- The Illustrated History of Football (2016)
- The Illustrated History of Football: Hall of Fame (2017)
