= John S. Bowen (executive) =

American businessman

John (Jack) S. Bowen (born c. 1927) is an American advertising executive and Advertising Hall of Fame inductee. He was CEO of D'Arcy Masius Benton & Bowles. He oversaw the merger of Benton & Bowles and D'Arcy MacManus Masius, then ushered in their drive toward globalization. He was inducted into the hall of fame following his retirement.
