= Tom Bowen (athletic director) =

American sports executive (born 1961)

Biographical details
- Born: May 27, 1961 (age 65); Denver, Colorado, U.S.
- Education: University of Notre Dame

Administrative career (AD unless noted)
- 1987–1995: De La Salle HS (CA)
- 1997–2000: Saint Mary's (associate AD)
- 2000: Saint Mary's (interim AD)
- 2000–2002: California (associate AD)
- 2004–2012: San Jose State
- 2012–2019: Memphis
- 2021–2022: Arkansas State

Thomas Michael Bowen (born May 27, 1961) is an American athletics administrator. He served as the athletic director at San Jose State University from 2004 to 2012, the University of Memphis from 2012 to 2019, and Arkansas State University from 2021 to 2022. He previously worked in the front office for the San Francisco 49ers of the National Football League (NFL).

== Early life and education ==
Bowen was born in Denver, Colorado and spent his childhood and Stone Mountain, Georgia and San Francisco, California. He played one year of college football at the University of San Diego, before transferring to the University of Notre Dame and studying for the Catholic priesthood.

== Career ==
Bowen began his career as a high school football coach in Colorado Springs, Colorado. In 1987, he moved to Concord, California to become athletic director at De La Salle High School, a Catholic secondary school. After eight years at De La Salle, Bowen became director of foundations and corporate relations at nearby Saint Mary's College of California in May 1995. At the beginning of 1997, Bowen moved to the Saint Mary's athletic department to become an associate athletic director overseeing budget, sponsorship, and student-athlete affairs. Bowen held that position until April 2000. Briefly in 2000, Bowen was also interim athletic director at Saint Mary's.

From July 2000 to September 2002, Bowen was associate athletic director for fundraising at the University of California, Berkeley.

In 2002, Bowen became director of community affairs in the front office of the NFL's San Francisco 49ers, later becoming the executive director of the 49ers Foundation. After three years with the 49ers, and with the endorsement of the 49ers' former head coach and general manager, Bill Walsh, Bowen accepted the athletic director job at San Jose State University on December 20, 2004, overseeing the San Jose State Spartans intercollegiate sports program for eight years, until 2012. Bowen was credited with the improved performance of the San Jose State Spartans sports teams and for the improvement of the San Jose State athletic facilities.

In 2012, he became the athletic director for the University of Memphis, where he oversaw the transition of the Memphis Tigers sports program from Conference USA to the new American Athletic Conference. He was also inducted into Omicron Delta Kappa at Memphis in 2014. In 2015, his Memphis contract was extended through June 2019, after he had been rumored to be a sought-after candidate for other NCAA Division I athletic director positions. At the time of his extension, Bowen was praised for leading the $40 million capital upgrade campaign of Memphis' athletic facilities and for the improved academic performance of Memphis Tigers athletes during his tenure.

On May 14, 2019, Bowen resigned from Memphis to pursue another career opening.
