= David James Bowen =

Welsh scholar and expert

David James Bowen (1925 – 3 August 2017) was a Welsh scholar and expert on the work of Welsh poets of the nobility.

He was born in Pembrokeshire, and attended grammar school in Fishguard, where he was influenced by David John Williams, one of his teachers. He attended the University of Wales, Aberystwyth, where he became a member of the Welsh Department, and was chair in 1980.

He has contributed many learned articles on late medieval Welsh poetry, including the work of Dafydd ap Gwilym, although his main interest was the life and work of poet Gruffudd Hiraethog (d. 1564). Bowen published a study of Hiraethog's life and work in 1990. It is typical of his work, where he often deals with historical and social backgrounds.

Bowen died on 3 August 2017, at Bronglais Hospital, Aberystwyth, aged 92.

== Selected Biographies ==
- Bowen, D. J. (1956), Barddoniaeth yr Uchelwyr, Gwasg Prifysgol Cymru
- Bowen, D. J. (1958), Gruffudd Hiraethog a'i Oes, Gwasg Prifysgol Cymru
- Bowen, D. J. (ed.) (1990), Gwaith Gruffudd Hiraethog, Gwasg Prifysgol Cymru
