= Mark Bowen (cricketer) =

English cricketer (born 1967)

Mark Nicholas Bowen (born 6 December 1967) is a former English cricketer active from 1991 to 2000, playing for Northamptonshire.

Bowen was born in Redcar, Yorkshire. He appeared in 67 first-class matches as a right arm fast medium bowler who was a righthanded batsman. He is regularly regarded as the second best bowler to have played cricket for Redcar CC, only to Mick McCabe. Bowen took 183 first-class wickets with a best performance of seven for 73 and scored 817 runs with a highest score of 32.

Bowen now plays Hockey for Keswick HC, He regularly appears for the 1st xl playing central midfield.
