= George Bowen (missionary) =

American missionary in India

- Born: April 30, 1816; Middlebury, Vermont
- Died: February 5, 1888 (aged 71); Bombay, India

George H. Bowen (30 April 1816 – 5 February 1888) was an American missionary, newspaper man, linguist, and translator in India. He was known as "The White Saint of India" for his resemblance in manner and dress to the Hindu holy men.

== Biography ==
Like many New Englanders of his generation Bowen was a skeptic, especially after reading the works of Edward Gibbon; however at the age of 28, in 1844, he grew into an acceptance of the Christian God upon reading William Paley's Natural Theology. Bowen subsequently enrolled in the Union Theological Seminary in New York and graduated from there in 1847.

Bowen went to India the next year as a missionary under the auspices of the American Board of Commissioners for Foreign Missions. He became assistant editor in 1851 and edited and published the Bombay Guardian from 1854 until his death in 1888. He was among the one of Christian missionaries who participated in famous religious polemics with Vishnubuva Brahmachari - an ascetic defender of the Hindu dharma. These meetings were held at Mumbai sea shore from 15 January 1857 to 28 May 1857 on every Thursday evening. Bowen had published a book viz. Discussions by the Sea Side giving brief report of these meetings. He was also the director of the Bombay Tract and Book Society. In the beginning of 1871, Bowen worked with American Methodist William Taylor administering to the needs of the offspring of Indian and European unions. In 1873 he joined the Methodist church. Bowen Memorial Methodist Church of Mumbai was established in his memory in 1889.
