= Bowen technique =

Alternative type of physical manipulation

The Bowen technique (or Bowen therapy) is an alternative type of physical manipulation named after Australian Thomas Ambrose Bowen (Tom Bowen) (1916–1982).

There is no clear evidence that the technique is a useful medical intervention.

== History ==
Bowen had no formal medical training and described his approach as a "gift from God". He referred to himself as an osteopath and tried to join the Australian register of osteopaths in 1981 but did not qualify for the title. He died as an unlicensed practitioner of manual therapy. In 1973 Bowen himself had referred to his ability to "average 65 patients per day", yet the technique as it is commonly practiced today is unlikely to achieve that volume.

Bowen did not document his technique, so its practice after his death has followed one or other differing interpretation of his work. It was not until some years after his death that the term "Bowen Technique" was coined. The technique goes by a wide variety of other names, including Smart Bowen, Fascial Kinetics, Integrated Bowen Therapy, Neurostructural Integration Technique (NST), Fascial Bowen, and Bowenwork. The technique has been popularized by some of the six men who observed him at work, including Oswald Rentsch, an osteopath whose interpretation has become the dominant, but not unchallenged, form. Learning this technique requires 120 hours of instruction, or as little as a weekend workshop.

== Method ==
Recipients are generally fully clothed. Each session typically involves gentle rolling motions across the muscles, tendons, and fascia. The therapy's distinctive features are the minimal nature of the physical intervention and pauses incorporated in the treatment. Proponents claim these pauses allow the body to "reset" itself.

== Effectiveness ==
In 2015, the Australian Government's Department of Health published the results of a review of alternative therapies that sought to determine if any were suitable for being covered by health insurance; Bowen Technique was one of 17 therapies evaluated for which no clear evidence of effectiveness was found. Quackwatch includes "Neuro-Structural Integration Technique (Bowen Therapy)" in its list of "questionable treatments."
