= Bowen baronets =

Baronetcy in the Baronetage of the United Kingdom

The Bowen Baronetcy, of Colworth in the County of Bedford, is a title in the Baronetage of the United Kingdom. It was created on 10 January 1921 for Albert Bowen. He was President of the Buenos Aires Great South Railway Company and a justice of the peace and high sheriff for Bedfordshire. The title descended from father to son until the early death of his grandson, the third Baronet, in 1939. The late Baronet was succeeded by his younger brother, the fourth Baronet. As of 2014 the baronetcy was held by the latter's grandson, the sixth Baronet, who succeeded in that year.

== Bowen baronets, of Colworth (1921) ==
- Sir Albert Edward Bowen, 1st Baronet (1858–1924)
- Sir Edward Crowther Bowen, 2nd Baronet (1885–1937)
- Sir John Edward Mortimer Bowen, 3rd Baronet (1918–1939)
- Sir Thomas Frederic Charles Bowen, 4th Baronet (1921–1989)
- Sir Mark Edward Mortimer Bowen, 5th Baronet (1958–2014)
- Sir George Edward Michael Bowen, 6th Baronet (born 1987)

The heir presumptive is the present holder's cousin Michael Edward Bowen (born 1944).
