= Owen (name) =

Owen is usually an anglicised variant of the Welsh personal name Owain. Originally a patronymic, Owen became a fixed surname in Wales beginning with the reign of Henry VIII. Etymologists consider it to originate from Eugene, meaning 'noble-born'. According to T. J. Morgan and Prys Morgan in Welsh Surnames: "the name is a derivation of the Latin Eugenis > OW Ou[u]ein, Eug[u]ein ... variously written in MW as Ewein, Owein, Ywein. LL gives the names Euguen, Iguein, Yuein, Ouein. The corresponding form in Irish is Eoghan." Morgan and Morgan note that there are less likely alternative explanations, and agree with Rachel Bromwich that Welsh Owein "is normally latinised as Eugenius", and that both the Welsh and Irish forms are Latin derivatives.

The Welsh name is a cognate and near-homonym of the Irish name Eógan (pronounced [ˈoːəun], partially anglicised as Eoghan, as noted by Morgan and Morgan, among other spellings). As such, the given name Owney is usually regarded as a diminutive of either Owen or Eoghan. However, another Irish name, Uaithne (pronounced [ˈuənʲə], meaning 'wood', 'work', 'pillar', or 'harmony') has also sometimes been anglicised as Owney.

Owen can also be an anglicised form of the French name Ouen, as in the case of Ouen of Rouen, metropolitan bishop of Rouen, known in Latin as Audoenus, from Germanic Audwin and Aldwin with French variant form Audoin. The anglicisation of the French digraph ou to ow is common in words such as couard > coward, and Old French poueir > power, tour > tower, etc. Welsh Owain has sometimes been Latinised as Audoenus in certain parish registers, through a folk etymology process, because both Owain and Ouen/Audwin have a typical anglicised form of Owen.

A relatively uncommon English surname, Owin, has also sometimes been spelt Owen.

The following notable people have Owen as a surname or first name.

== Surname ==
- Alfred Owen (1908–1975), English businessman
- Amanda Owen (born 1974), English writer
- Beverley Owen (1937–2019), American actress
- Brad Owen (born 1950), American politician
- Brooklyn Owen (born 2000), American LGBTQ activist
- Cliff Owen (1919–1993), English filmmaker
- Clive Owen (born 1964), English actor
- Coleman Owen (born 2001), American football player
- Dale Owen (1924–1997), Welsh architect
- Daniel Owen (1836–1895), Welsh novelist
- Daniel Owen (judge) (1732–1812), lieutenant governor of Rhode Island and Chief Justice of the Rhode Island Supreme Court
- Dicky Owen (1876–1932), Welsh rugby union player
- Duane Owen (1961–2023), American convicted murderer
- Edmund Owen (1847–1915), English surgeon
- Eleanor Owen (1921–2022), American actress, journalist, playwright, professor, and costume designer
- Evelyn Owen (1915–1949), Australian soldier and inventor
- George Owen (disambiguation)
- Gilberto Owen (1904–1952), Mexican poet
- Gordon Owen (born 1959), English soccer player
- Gwilym Ellis Lane Owen (1922–1982), Welsh philosopher
- Henry Owen (1716–1795), Welsh theologian
- Ian Owen (born 1948), Australian rules football player
- Sir Isambard Owen (1850–1927), British academic and physician
- Jack Owen (born 1967), American death metal guitarist
- Jake Owen (born 1981), American musician, singer, and songwriter
- Jane Owen (born 1963), English diplomat and politician
- Jimmy Owen (1864–??), English soccer player
- Joshua T. Owen (1821–1887), Welsh–American military officer
- Judith Owen (born 1969), Welsh singer-songwriter
- Kai Owen (born 1975), Welsh actor
- Kenneth Owen (1918–2001), American farmer and politician
- Larry Owen (1955–2018), American baseball player
- Leah Owen (1953–2024), Welsh singer
- Lloyd Owen (born 1966), English actor
- Louise Owen (1895–1973), American actress in silent films
- Lucy Owen (born 1971), Welsh newsreader
- Maria Tallant Owen (1825–1913), American botanist
- Mark Owen (born 1972), English musician
- Marv Owen (1906–1991), American baseball player, manager, and scout
- May Owen (1892–1988), American physician
- Michael Owen (born 1979), English soccer player
- Nancy Owen (born 1943), American volleyball player
- Nick Owen (born 1947), English television presenter and newsreader
- Nora Owen (born 1945), Irish politician
- Orville Ward Owen (1854–1924), American physician
- Priscilla Owen (born 1954), American judge
- Rachel Owen (1968–2016), Welsh lecturer, photographer, and printmaker
- Randy Owen (born 1949), American musician
- Reginald Owen (1887–1972), English actor
- Richard Owen (1804–1892), English biologist
- Robert Owen (1771-1858), Welsh social reformer
- Russell Owen (1889–1952), American journalist
- Ruth Bryan Owen (1885–1954), American diplomat and politician
- Sarah Owen (born 1983), English politician
- Scott Owen (born 1975), Australian musician
- Sid Owen (born 1972), English actor
- Sidney Owen (cricketer) (born 1942), English cricketer
- Siobhan Owen (born 1993), Australian harpist
- Sri Owen (1935–2025), Indonesian cook and food writer
- Steve Owen (disambiguation), several people
- Susan Owen (born 1959), American operatic soprano and voice teacher
- Syd Owen (1927–1999), English footballer
- Tanner Owen (born 1996), American football player
- Wilfred Owen (1893–1918), English poet and soldier
- William Fitzwilliam Owen (1774–1857), English naval officer, explorer, and hydrographer

== First name ==
- Owen Aldis (1926–2001), American psychologist
- Owen A. Allred (1914–2005), American Mormon priest
- Owen Ansah (born 2000), German sprinter
- Owen Antoniuk (born 2002), Canadian soccer player
- Owen Arthur (1949–2020), Barbadian politician
- Owen Ashmore (1920–1995), English archaeologist
- Owen Aspinall (1927–1997), American attorney and politician
- Owen Astrachan (born 1956), American computer scientist and professor
- Owen J. Baggett (1920–2006), American military pilot
- Owen Bailey (born 1999), English soccer player
- Owen Baldwin (1893–1942), English flying ace
- Owen Barfield (1898–1997), English author, philosopher, and poet
- Owen Bates (born 2002), English darts player
- Owen Beasley (1877–1960), English judge and lawyer
- Owen Beattie (born 1949), Canadian anthropologist and professor
- Owen M. Begley (1906–1981), American politician
- Owen Bell (born 1999), Scottish soccer player
- Owen Bennett (born 1985), British journalist
- Owen Bevan (born 2003), English–Welsh soccer player
- Owen Bieber (1929–2020), American labor union activist
- Owen Blundell (born 1986), Australian singer
- Owen Bonnici (born 1980), Maltese politician
- Owen Boxall, English weightlifter
- Owen Bradley (1915–1998), American music producer
- Owen Brannigan (1908–1973), English operatic bass
- Owen Brenman (born 1956), English actor
- Owen Brewster (1888–1961), American politician
- Owen Bridle (1910–1983), Australian rugby union player
- Owen Buckley (born 1998), English rugby league football player
- Owen Bugeja (born 1990), Maltese soccer player
- Owen Burrows (1903–1984), Australian cricketer
- Owen Bush (1921–2001), American actor
- Owen Caissie (born 2002), Canadian baseball player
- Owen Carron (born 1953), Irish activist, politician, and teacher
- Owen Casey (born 1969), Irish tennis player
- Owen Chadwick (1916–2015), English Anglican priest, academic, historian, and writer
- Owen Chamberlain (1920–2006), American physicist
- Owen Chase (1797–1969), American author and sailor
- Owen Cheung (born 1987), Hong Kong actor
- Owen Chirombe (born 1973), Zimbabwean cricket umpire
- Owen Chomanika, Malawian politician
- Owen Chow (born 1997), Hong Kong political activist
- Owen Churchill (1896–1985), American sailor
- Owen Cleary (1900–1961), American politician
- Owen Cole (born 2004), American cyclist
- Owen Coll (born 1976), Irish soccer player
- Owen Cooper (born 2009), English actor
- Owen Cooper (boxer) (born 2000), English boxer
- Owen Corrie (1882–1965), British judge
- Owen Cowley (1868–1922), Australian cricketer
- Owen Cox (1866–1932), Welsh–born Australian businessman and politician
- Owen Coyle (born 1966), Irish football manager and player
- Owen Craigie (born 1978), Australian rugby league football player
- Owen Cravens (born 2003), American paratriathlete
- Owen Crowe (born 1982), Canadian poker player
- Owen Crump (1903–1998), American actor, filmmaker, and film producer
- Owen Cummins (1874–1953), Australian drover, stockman, and horse breeder
- Owen Cunningham (born 1967), Australian rugby league football player
- Owen Da Gama (born 1961), South African football manager
- Owen Dale (born 1998), English soccer player
- Owen Damm (born 2003), American soccer player
- Owen Danoff (born 1989), American singer and songwriter
- Owen Davidson (1943–2023), Australian tennis player
- Owen Davis (1874–1956), American playwright
- Owen Dawkins (born 1978), English cricketer
- Owen Dennis, American animator, filmmaker, and voice actor
- Owen J. Dever (1884–1953), Scottish–born American politician and library director
- Owen Devonport (born 2004), English soccer player
- Owen Dippie, New Zealand street artist
- Owen Dixon (1886–1972), Australian diplomat and judge
- Owen Dodgson (born 2003), English soccer player
- Owen Dodson (1914–1983), American novelist, playwright, and poet
- Owen Dolan (1928–2025), New Zealand Catholic bishop
- Owen Donohoe (1945–2026), American politician
- Owen Drake (1936–2011), American politician and military pilot
- Owen Dunell (1856–1929), South African cricketer
- Owen Eames (born 2006), English footballer
- Owen Elding (born 2006), English soccer player
- Owen Farrell (born 1991), English rugby union player
- Owen M. Fiss (born 1938), American legal scholar
- Owen Franks (born 1987), New Zealand rugby union player
- Owen Ford (born 1988), Canadian baseball player
- Owen Foxwell (born 2003), Australian basketballer
- Owen Freeman (born 2004), American basketball player
- Owen A. Gallagher (1902–1977), American politician
- Owen A. Galvin (1852–1897), American attorney and politician
- Owen Garriott (1930–2019), American astronaut
- Owen Garvan (born 1988), Irish soccer player
- Owen Hale (born 1948), American drummer
- Owen Hannaway (1939–2006), Scottish science historian
- Owen Hargreaves (born 1981), English soccer player
- Owen Harries (1930–2020), Welsh–Australian magazine editor, academic, and writer
- Owen Hart (1965–1999), Canadian wrestler
- Owen Hatherley (born 1981), English writer and journalist
- Owen Heard (born 2001), English athlete
- Owen Heary (born 1976), Irish soccer manager and player
- Owen Hegarty, Australian mining engineer
- Owen Heinecke (born 2003), American football player
- Owen Henry (born 1959), American politician
- Owen Hesketh (born 2002), Welsh soccer player
- Owen Hill (born 1982), American politician
- Owen Hindle (born 1940), English chess player
- Owen A. Hoban (1875–1952), American attorney and politician
- Owen Holohan, Irish hurler
- Owen Hubert (born 2000), Canadian–American football player
- Owen Hulland (born 1999), Australian basketball player
- Owen Hurcum (born 1997), English politician
- Owen Husney (born 1947), American music manager and record executive
- Owen Ivins (born 1991), South African–born New Zealand cricketer
- Owen James (born 2000), English soccer player
- Owen Joyner (born 2000), American actor
- Owen Kahn (1903–1981), American baseball player
- Owen Kaposa (born 1983), Zambian soccer player
- Owen Kelly (born 1977), Australian racing driver
- Owen Kember (1943–2004), English cricketer
- Owen Kildare (1864–1911), American writer
- Owen Kinsella, Irish soccer player
- Owen M. Kiernan (1867–1940), American politician
- Owen Kirby (born 1999), Canadian lawn bowler
- Owen Klassen (born 1991), Canadian basketball player
- Owen Kline (born 1991), American actor and filmmaker
- Owen Kouassi (born 2003), French soccer player
- Owen Kydd (born 1975), Canadian artist and photographer
- Owen Lambe (born 2000), American soccer player
- Owen Lattimore (1900–1989), American Orientalist and writer
- Owen Laukkanen (born 1983), Canadian author and writer
- Owen Leeming (born 1930), New Zealand playwright, poet, radio presenter, and television producer
- Owen Lentz (born 1980), South African–born American rugby union player
- Owen Livesey (born 1991), English judoka, submission wrestler, and mixed martial artist
- Owen Lovejoy (1811–1864), American lawyer and politician
- Owen Luder (1928–2021), English architect
- Owen Lynch (1931–2013), American anthropologist
- Owen P. Lyons (1849–1933), American politician
- Owen Maddock (1925–2000), English engineer
- Owen Magee (1925–2007), Australian military officer
- Owen Marecic (born 1988), American football player
- Owen Marks (1899–1960), English film editor
- Owen Maynard (1924–2000), Canadian spacecraft engineer
- Owen McAleer (1858–1944), American businessman and politician
- Owen McAuley (born 1973), Northern Irish racing driver
- Owen McBride (born 1941), Irish singer
- Owen McCafferty (born 1961), Northern Irish playwright
- Owen McCarron (1929–2005), Canadian comics artist and publisher
- Owen McCarthy (1882–1940), Australian rugby league football player
- Owen McCarty, American biomedical engineer
- Owen McCourt (1884–1907), Canadian ice hockey player
- Owen McCown (born 2003), American football player
- Owen McDonnell (born 1974), Irish actor
- Owen McGee (born 1970), English soccer player
- Owen McNally (1906–1973), Scottish soccer player
- Owen Mead (1892–1942), New Zealand military officer
- Owen Medlock (1938–2021), English soccer player
- Owen Meighan (born 1944), Belizean athlete
- Owen Merrett (born 2004), English hammer thrower
- Owen Merton (1887–1931), New Zealand–born British painter
- Owen Michaels (born 2002), American ice hockey player
- Owen Mitchell (born 1940), Jamaican cricketer
- Owen Moffat (born 2002), Scottish soccer player
- Owen Money (born 1947), Welsh actor, comedian, musician, and radio presenter
- Owen Moore (1886–1939), Irish–born American actor
- Owen Moran (1884–1949), English boxer
- Owen Morris, Welsh record producer
- Owen Morrison (born 1981), Northern Irish soccer player
- Owen Morshead (1893–1977), English military officer and librarian
- Owen Moxon (born 1998), English soccer player
- Owen Mulligan (born 1981), Irish Gaelic football player
- Owen Murray (born 1948), Scottish accordionist and professor
- Owen Murtagh (1887–1937), Australian rules football player
- Owen Muzondo (born 1998), Zimbabwean cricketer
- Owen Nacker (1883–1959), American automotive engineer
- Owen Nares (1888–1943), English actor
- Owen Ncube, Zimbabwean politician
- Owen Nkumane (born 1975), South African rugby union player
- Owen Nolan (born 1972), Northern Irish ice hockey player
- Owen Nuttridge, New Zealand soccer player
- Owen Orford, American booking agent and concert tour promoter
- Owen Oseni (born 2003), Irish soccer player
- Owen Otasowie (born 2001), American soccer player
- Owen Oyston (born 1934), English businessman
- Owen Painter (born 1997), American actor best known for his role as Isaac Night/Slurp in the Netflix series Wednesday
- Owen Pallett (born 1979), Canadian arranger, composer, musician
- Owen M. Panner (1924–2018), American attorney and judge
- Owen Pappoe (born 2000), American football player
- Owen Parkin (born 1972), English cricketer
- Owen Pattie (born 2004), Australian rugby league football player
- Owen Paul (born 1962), Scottish musician, singer, and songwriter
- Owen Paulsen, New Zealand judge
- Owen Pick (born 1991), English para snowboarder
- Owen Pickard (born 1969), English soccer manager and player
- Owen Pickering (born 2004), Canadian ice hockey player
- Owen B. Pickett (1930–2010), American lawyer and politician
- Owen Pilgrim (1893–1972), Barbadian cricketer
- Owen Pinnell (born 1947), New Zealand–Canadian bobsledder
- Owen Pochman (born 1977), American football player
- Owen Power (born 2002), Canadian ice hockey player
- Owen Purcell (born 2000), Canadian curler
- Owen Reidy (born 1972), Irish trade unionist
- Owen Reilly (born 1937), Scottish boxer
- Owen Renfroe, American filmmaker
- Owen Reynolds (1900–1984), American football player
- Owen Richardson (1879–1959), English physicist
- Owen Riegling (born 1998), Canadian singer and songwriter
- Owen Rinehart, American polo player
- Owen Rogers (born 1958), South African judge
- Owen Roizman (1936–2023), American cinematographer
- Owen Ronald (born 1993), Scottish soccer player
- Owen Ruffhead (1723–1769), Welsh writer
- Owen Rutter (1889–1944), English historian, novelist, and travel writer
- Owen Samuels, American football coach
- Owen Saunders (1904–1993), English mathematician and university administrator
- Owen Scheetz (1913–1994), American baseball player
- Owen Schmitt (born 1985), American football player
- Owen Scholte (1896–1918), English flying ace
- Owen Sexton (born 1975), Irish Gaelic football player
- Owen Shannon (1879–1918), American baseball player
- Owen Sheers (born 1974), Fijian–born Welsh author, playwright, and poet
- Owen Shroyer (born 1989), American media presenter
- Owen Sillinger (born 1997), Canadian ice hockey player
- Owen Simonin (born 1997), French entrepreneur and influencer
- Owen Simpson (born 1943), English soccer player
- Owen Sinclair (1862–1927), Australian politician
- Owen Ray Skelton (1886–1969), American automotive engineer
- Owen Smaulding (1896–1961), American baseball player
- Owen Southwell (1892–1961), American architect
- Owen Stable (1923–2019), British judge
- Owen Strachan, American Calvinist theologian
- Owen Tangavelou (born 2005), French–born Vietnamese racing driver
- Owen Taylor (born 2001), Welsh soccer player
- Owen Teague, American actor
- Owen Teale (born 1961), Welsh actor
- Owen Temple (born 1976), American musician, singer, and songwriter
- Owen Thiele, American actor, podcaster, and singer
- Owen Thuerk (1918–1985), American football player and coach
- Owen Tippett (born 1999), Canadian ice hockey player
- Owen Toon (born 1947), American physicist and professor
- Owen Torrey (1925–2001), American sailor
- Owen Tracey (1915–1941), New Zealand flying ace
- Owen Trainor (1894–1956), Canadian Physician and politician
- Owen Tromans, English musician, singer, and songwriter
- Owen Trout (born 1999), English rugby league football player
- Owen Tuohy (1921–2007), Irish fencer
- Owen Underhill (born 1954), Canadian composer, conductor, flutist, and professor
- Owen Von Richter (born 1975), Canadian medley swimmer
- Owen Wait (1926–1981), English cricketer
- Owen Wall (born 1999), Irish hurler
- Owen Walter (born 1979), Canadian ice hockey player
- Owen Walz (born 2004), American soccer player
- Owen Warner (born 1999), English actor
- Owen Watkin (born 1996), Welsh rugby union player
- Owen Webster (1929–2018), American chemist
- Owen Weingott (1922–2002), Australian actor, filmmaker, and drama teacher
- Owen A. Wells (1844–1935), Irish–American lawyer and politician
- Owen Wijndal (born 1999), Dutch soccer player
- Owen Wilkes (1940–2005), New Zealand peace campaigner
- Owen Wilson (born 1968), American actor
- Owen Windsor (born 2001), English soccer player
- Owen Wister (1860–1938), American writer
- Owen Witte (born 1949), American physician, professor, and scientist
- Owen Wolff (born 2004), American soccer player
- Owen Woodhouse (1916–2014), New Zealand judge
- Owen Yalandja (born 1961), Aboriginal Australian carver, painter, and singer
- Owen D. Young (1874–1962), American businessman, diplomat, and lawyer
- Owen Zidar (born 1985), American academic and economist
- Owen Zinko (1945–1996), Australian rules football player

== Fictional characters ==
- Owen (Black Clover), a character in the manga series Black Clover
- Owen, a character from the animated reality series Total Drama
- Owen Grady, protagonist of Jurassic World
- Owen Green, a character in the podcast The Bright Sessions
- Owen Harper, protagonist in the television series Torchwood
- Owen Hunt in Grey's Anatomy
- Owen Lars, a Star Wars character, step-uncle of Luke Skywalker
- Owen Lawton, a character in Karen McManus's novel One of Us Is Next
- Owen Lift, son of Momma Lift in Throw Momma from the Train
- Owen Manning, a character in Chicago Med
- Owen Marshall, protagonist defense attorney in the television series Owen Marshall, Counselor at Law
- Owen Meany, title character in John Irving's novel A Prayer For Owen Meany
- Owen Mercer, the second Captain Boomerang in DC Comics
- Owen Milgrim, a main character in the miniseries Maniac
- Owen Milligan from the Degrassi series
- Owen Moore from the action-adventure video game, The Last of Us Part II
- Owen Paris from the Star Trek franchise
- Owen Quine, a character in J. K. Rowling's novel The Silkworm
- Owen Tillerman, a main character in the TV series Central Park
- Owen Underhill in King's novel Dreamcatcher
- Owen Wells in Gabrielle Zevin's novel Elsewhere
- Owen the Incline Engine, a character from the children's television series Thomas and Friends
- Owen Kaios, a character in the anime and game Little Battlers Experience W
- Owen in I Saw The TV Glow

== See also ==
- Several Owen baronetcies
- Ab Owain
- Ab Owen
- Bowen (surname)
- Bowens (surname)
- Bown
- Bowne
- Bownes
- Owens (surname)
