= Horder =

Horder may refer to:

- Horder (sculptor), 12th-century Danish stonemason and sculptor
- William Horder (1929-2004), Australian rugby league footballer
- Chris Horder (born 1976), Australian contemporary artist
- Clarrie Horder (1890-1960), Australian pioneer rugby league player
- Gwyneth Horder-Payton (born 1962), American television director
- Harold Horder (1894–1978), Australian rugby league player, great-uncle of Wade
- Jeremy Horder (born 1962), Professor of Criminal Law at LSE
- John Horder (1919-2012), English general practitioner
- Maurene Horder (born 1950), Australian politician
- Max Horder (1923–1965), Australian rules footballer
- Mervyn Horder, (1910–1997), composer and publisher
- Percy Richard Morley Horder (1870-1944), English architect
- Thomas Horder, 1st Baron Horder (1871–1955)
- Wade Horder (born 1975), Australian rugby league player, great-nephew of Harold
