= Owens (surname) =

Owens is a surname representing two separate Celtic ethnicities: the Welsh from ab Owain meaning "son of Owen" (Owen meaning 'noble') with English patronymic-s, and the Irish by the Gaelic surname Mac Eoghain.

This is a list of notable people born with the last name Owens and people who married into the Owens family.

- Becky Owens, American politician
- Betty Jean Owens (born 1940), African American kidnapping victim
- Bill Owens (Colorado politician) (born 1950), 40th Governor of Colorado
- Bill Owens (Massachusetts politician) (1937–2022), African-American Massachusetts businessman and politician
- Bill Owens (New York politician) (born 1949), Representative for New York
- Bill Owens (photographer), American author of Suburbia
- Billy Owens (born 1969), American basketball player
- Billy Owens (American football) (born 1965), American football player
- Bob Owens (businessman) (1921–1999), New Zealand businessman and mayor
- Bob Owens (born c. 1935), American football coach
- Bob Owens (American football, born 1946), American football coach
- Brick Owens (1885–1949), American baseball umpire
- Brig Owens (1943–2022), American football player
- Buck Owens (1929–2006), American country music singer
- Candace Owens (born 1990), African-American political commentator
- Casey Owens (c. 1981–2014), United States Marine
- Casey Owens (basketball), American professional basketball coach
- Craig Owens, American musician
- Craig Owens (author), American historian, author, fine art photographer, and television personality
- Craig Owens (critic) (1950–1990), American post-modernist art critic, gay activist and feminist
- Commodore Perry Owens (1852–1919), American lawman and gunfighter of the Old West
- Damian Owens (born 1976), American basketball player
- Queen Latifah (born Dana Elaine Owens in 1970), African-American rapper/singer and actress
- Darryl Owens (1937–2022), African-American politician
- Delia Owens (born 1949), American author and zoologist
- Ed Owens (1950–1971), American basketball player
- Evelyn Owens (1931–2010), Irish Labour Party politician and trade union activist
- Gary Owens (1936–2015), American radio and TV announcer
- Gervarrius Owens (born 1999), American football player
- Ginny Owens (born 1975), American contemporary Christian music and pop singer/songwriter, author and blogger
- Graeme Owens (born 1988), English footballer
- Greg Owens (born 1981), Australian football player
- Hailey Owens (2003–2014), American murder victim
- Horace Owens (born 1961), American basketball player
- Ike Owens (1918–1998), GB & Wales international rugby league & union footballer
- Isaac Owens, English footballer
- Isaiah "Ikey" Owens (1974–2014), African-American keyboardist formerly of The Mars Volta
- Jack Owens (singer-songwriter), American singer/songwriter
- Jacob Owens (born 1984), American af2 defensive lineman
- Jay Owens (musician) (1947–2005), African-American blues guitarist, singer and songwriter
- Jerry Owens (born 1981), American baseball player
- Jesse Owens (1913–1980), American Olympic athlete
- John Owens (merchant) (1790–1846), English merchant
- John Owens (Australian politician) (1809–1866), doctor and politician in Victoria, Australia
- John E. Owens (1824–1886), English-American comedian
- John G. Owens (1865–1893), American archaeologist
- John W. Owens (1884–1968), editorial writer on the Baltimore Sun
- John Reginald Owens (1890–1944), English footballer also known as Reg Owens
- John Sidney Owens (1893–1965), American pursuit pilot and World War I flying ace
- John Owens (Gaelic footballer) (born 1966), Irish Gaelic footballer
- John B. Owens (born 1971), American lawyer and federal appellate judge
- Johnny Owens (born 1977), Canadian drummer
- John Owens (American football) (born 1980), American football tight end
- Jonathan Owens (born 1995), American football player and husband of American gymnast, Simone Biles
- Joseph Owens (Jesuit), priest, Caribbean social worker and author
- Joseph Owens (Redemptorist) (1908–2005), Canadian priest and scholar in medieval philosophy
- Josh Owens (born 1988), American basketball player for Hapoel Tel Aviv of the Israeli Basketball Premier League
- Julie Owens (born 1958), Australian politician
- Keith Owens (born 1969), American basketball player
- Ken Owens (born 1987), Welsh rugby union player
- Ken Owens (basketball) (born 1959), American basketball player and coach
- Lamar S. Owens Jr., American coach and United States Naval Academy quarterback
- Lilliana Owens (1898–1992), American nun, historian and writer
- Lynne Owens (born 1969), British law enforcement officer
- Mary Ann Aspinwall Owens (1928–2005), philatelist of New York
- Mathew Owens (born 1977), Welsh space physicist
- Michael Owens (politician), African-American politician
- Nancy Fulda (née Owens), American science fiction writer, editor, and computer scientist
- Natasha Owens (born 1976), American Christian musician
- Nigel Owens (born 1971), Welsh international rugby referee
- O'dell Owens (1947–2022), African-American physician
- Pat Owens (born 1941), mayor of Grand Forks, North Dakota from 1996 to 2000
- Patricia Owens (1925–2000), Canadian-born actress in Hollywood films
- Randy Owens (1959–2015), American basketball player
- Rashod Owens (born 2001), American football player
- Rick Owens (born 1962), American fashion designer
- Robert Owens (composer) (1925–2017), African-American composer, pianist, and actor
- Robert Owens (musician) (born 1961), vocalist on Chicago house records in the 1980s
- Robert A. Owens (1920–1942), United States marine hero of the World War II landing at Bougainville; posthumously awarded the Medal of Honor
- Robert Bowie Owens (1870–1940), American electric engineer who discovered alpha rays
- Robert G. Owens Jr. (1917–2007), United States marine general
- Robyn Owens, Australian applied mathematician and computer scientist
- Sam Owens, American musician and artist
- Samuel Owens (1856–1921), American politician
- Sandra Tayler (née Owens) (born 1973), American short story and children's book writer and blogger
- Steve Owens (American football) (born 1947), American football player and winner of the Heisman Trophy
- Steve Owens (baseball) (born 1965), American college baseball coach
- Susan Owens (1949–2025), associate justice of the Washington Supreme Court
- Susie Owens (born 1956), American model and perfumer
- Susan Owens (academic) (born 1954), British professor of Environment and Policy
- Susan O. Hickey (née Owens) (born 1955), Chief United States District Judge of the United States District Court for the Western District of Arkansas
- Terique Owens (born 1999), American football player
- Terrell Owens (born 1973), American football player
- Tim "Ripper" Owens (born 1967), American heavy metal singer
- Tinker Owens (born 1954), American football player
- Tyler Owens (born 2001), American football player
- Will Owens (1901–1999), African-American Negro League baseball player
- William Owens (admiral) (born 1940), American naval commander, former Vice Chairman, Joint Chiefs of Staff, also former CEO of Nortel
- William Owens (Canadian politician) (1840–1917), Legislative Assembly of Quebec for Argenteuil and Senator for Inkerman, Quebec
- William Owens (Navy SEAL) (1980–2017), United States Navy SEALs senior chief petty officer
- William A. Owens (1905–1990), American author
- William C. Owens Jr. (born 1947), Democratic member of the North Carolina General Assembly
- William Claiborne Owens (1849–1925), United States House of Representatives for Kentucky
- Zonita Jeffreys Owens (1908–1981), American educator

== See also ==
- Ab Owain
- Ab Owen
- Bowen (surname)
- Bowens (surname)
- Bown
- Bowne
- Bownes
- Owen (name), given name and surname
