= 1924 NSWRFL season =

Rugby league competition

1924 New South Wales Rugby Football League
- Teams: 9
- Premiers: Balmain (6th title)
- Minor premiers: Balmain (6th title)
- Matches played: 37
- Points scored: 917
- Top points scorer: Jack Courtney (42)
- Wooden spoon: Newtown (1st spoon)
- Top try-scorer: Tommy Kennedy (10)

The 1924 New South Wales Rugby Football League premiership was the seventeenth season of Sydney’s top-level rugby league club competition, Australia’s first. Nine teams from across the city contested during the season which culminated in Balmain’s victory over South Sydney in the premiership final. The 1924 season was the last in the NSWRFL for future Australian Rugby League Hall of Fame inductee, Harold Horder.

== Teams ==
- Balmain, formed on 23 January 1908 at Balmain Town Hall
- Eastern Suburbs, formed on 24 January 1908 at Paddington Town Hall
- Glebe, formed on 9 January 1908
- Newtown, formed on 14 January 1908
- North Sydney, formed on 7 February 1908
- South Sydney, formed on 17 January 1908 at Redfern Town Hall
- St. George, formed on 8 November 1920 at Kogarah School of Arts
- Western Suburbs, formed on 4 February 1908
- University, formed in 1919 at Sydney University

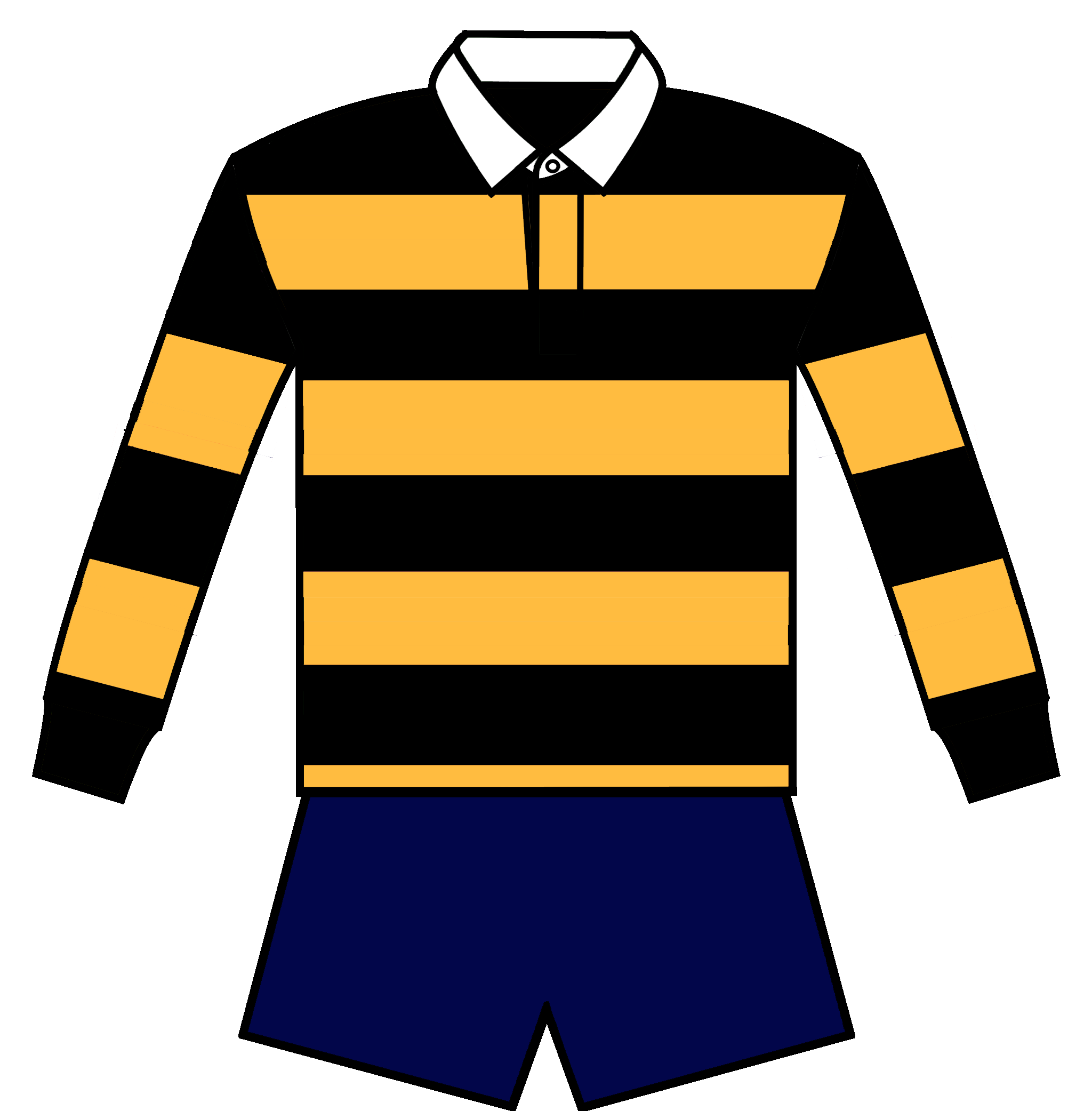
Balmain 17th season Ground: Birchgrove Oval; Captain-Coach: Charles Fraser

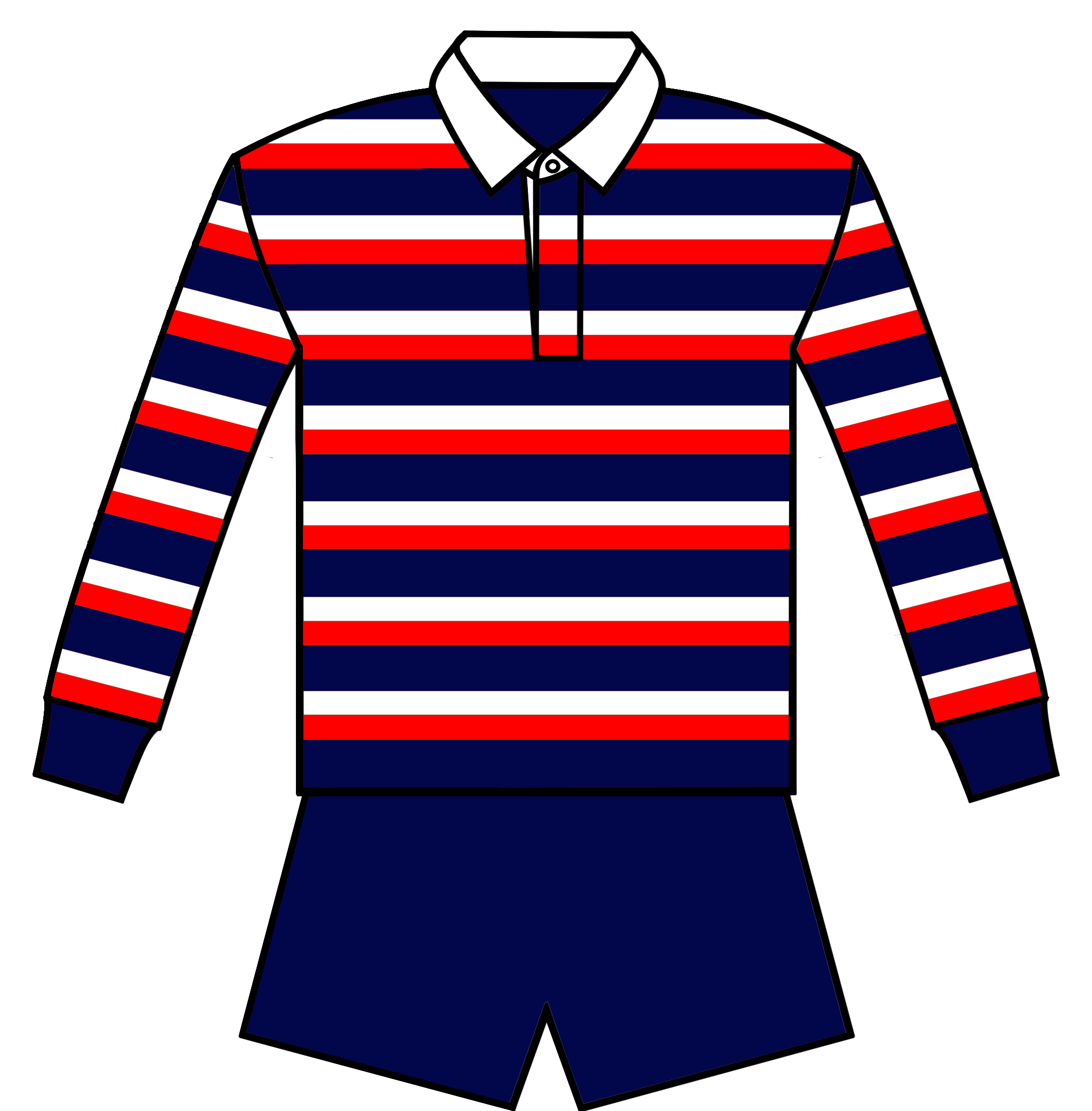
Eastern Suburbs 17th season Ground: Sydney Sports Ground; Coach: Captains: Arthur Oxford, Jack Watkins

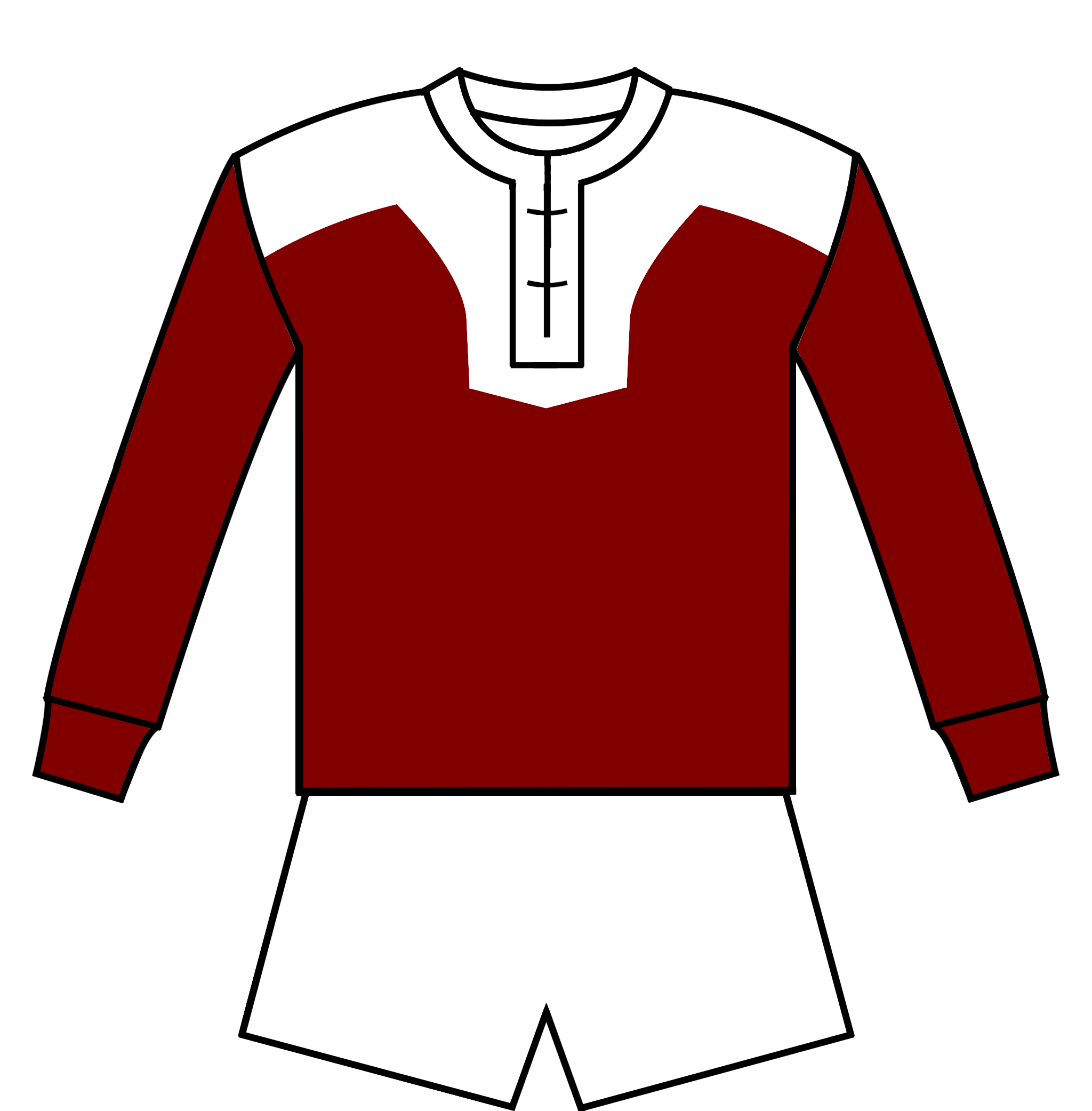
Glebe 17th season Ground: Birchgrove Oval; Coach: Jack Hickey; Captain: Bill Benson

Newtown 17th season Ground: Marrickville Oval; Coach: Bill Farnsworth; Captain: Tom Ellis

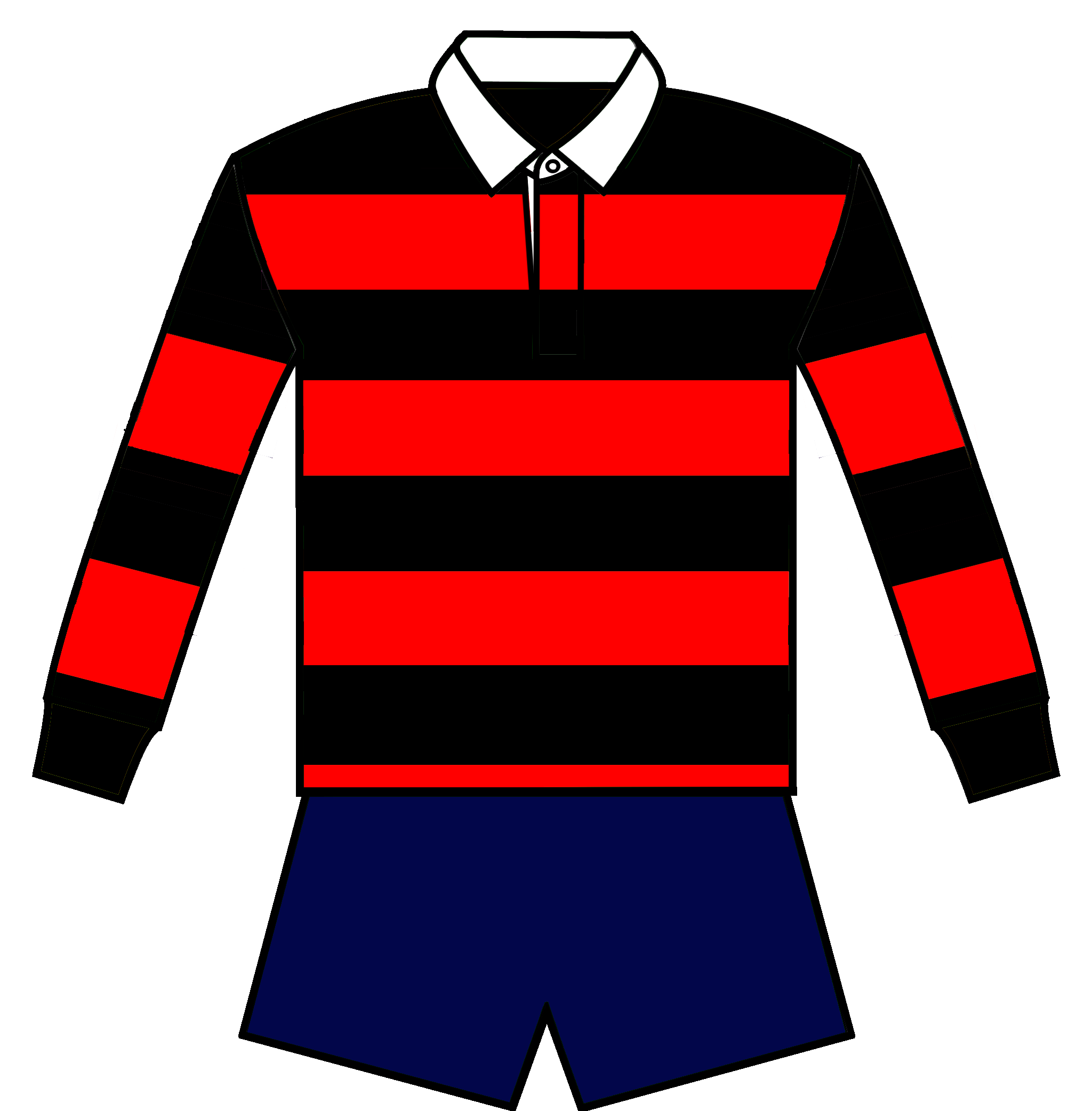
North Sydney 17th season Ground: North Sydney Oval; Coach: Jim Devereux; Captain: Clarrie Ives

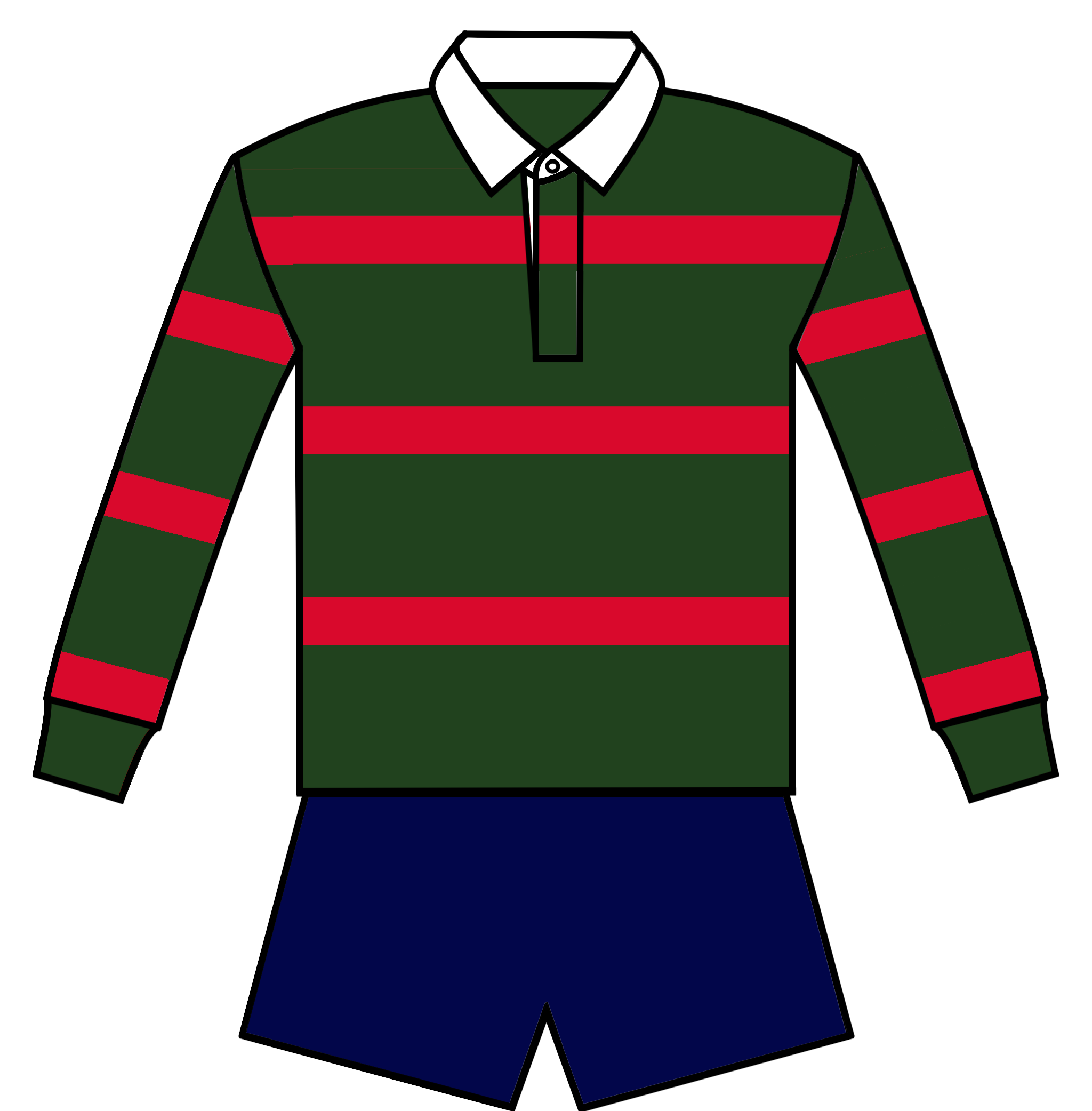
South Sydney 17th season Ground: Sydney Cricket Ground; Coach: Owen McCarthy; Captain: Harold Horder

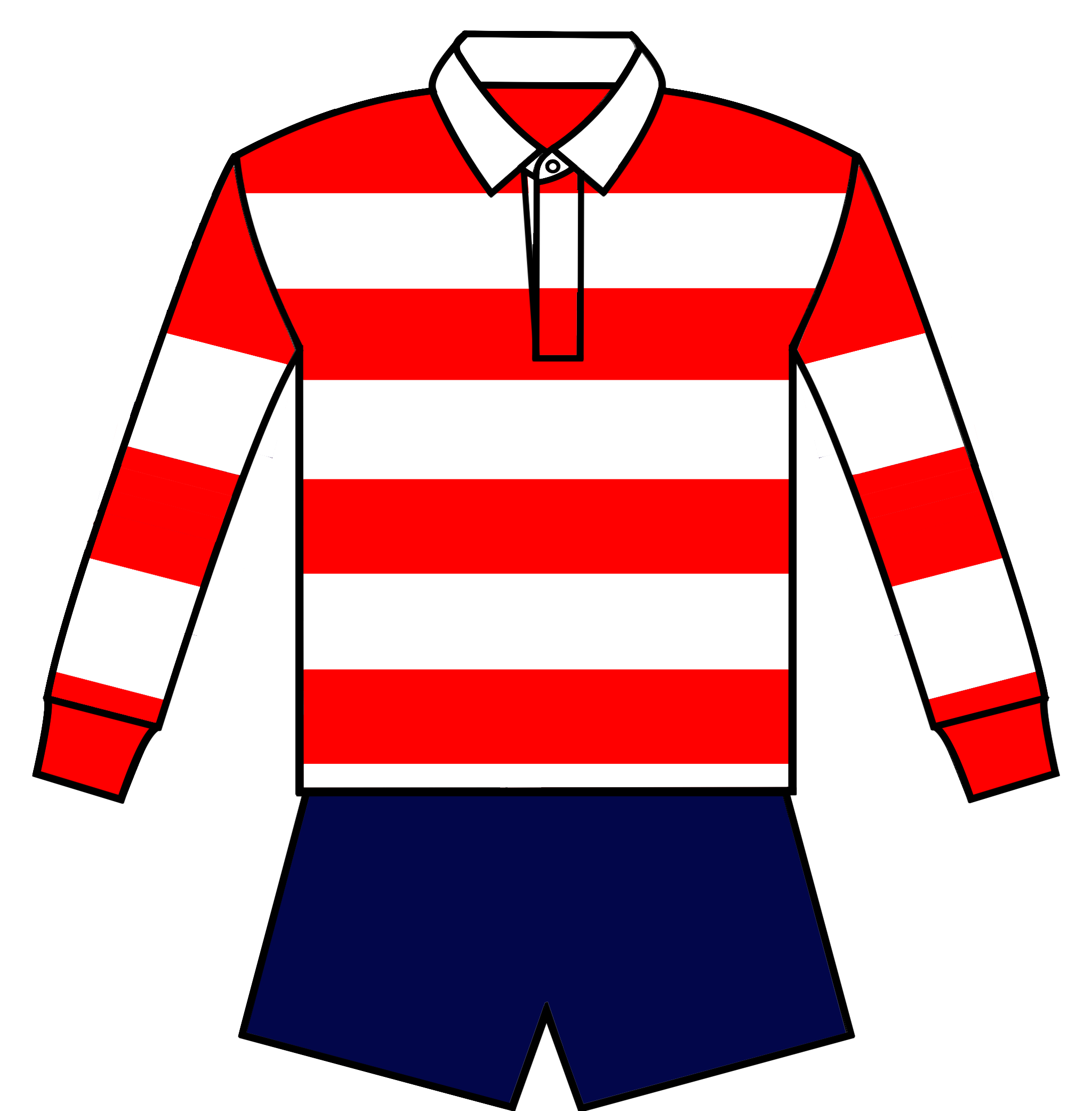
St. George 4th season Ground: Earl Park; Coach: Herb Gilbert; Captain: Arnold Traynor, George Carstairs

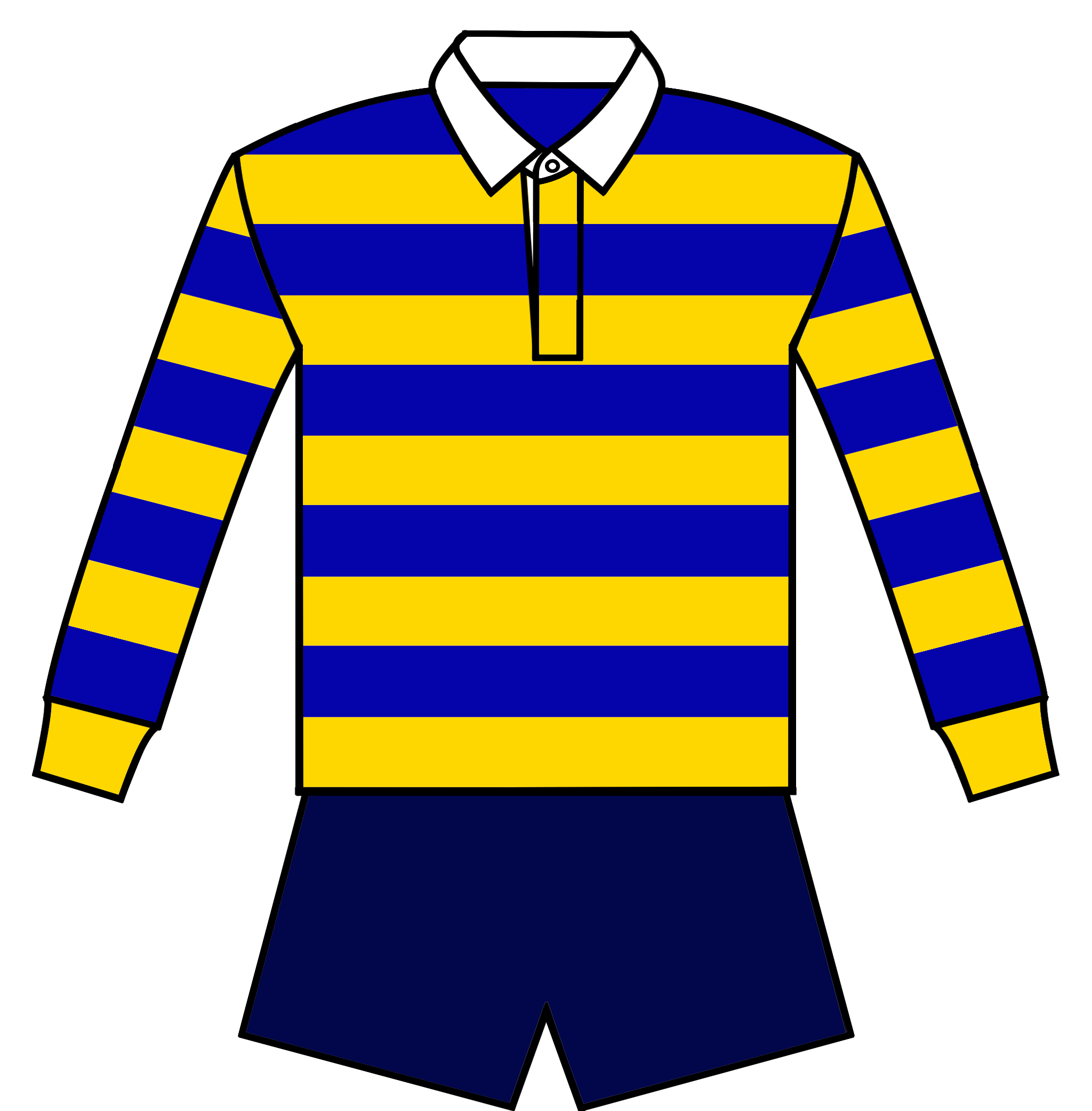
University 5th season Coach: Bill Kelly; Captain: Hubert Finn, Alby Lane

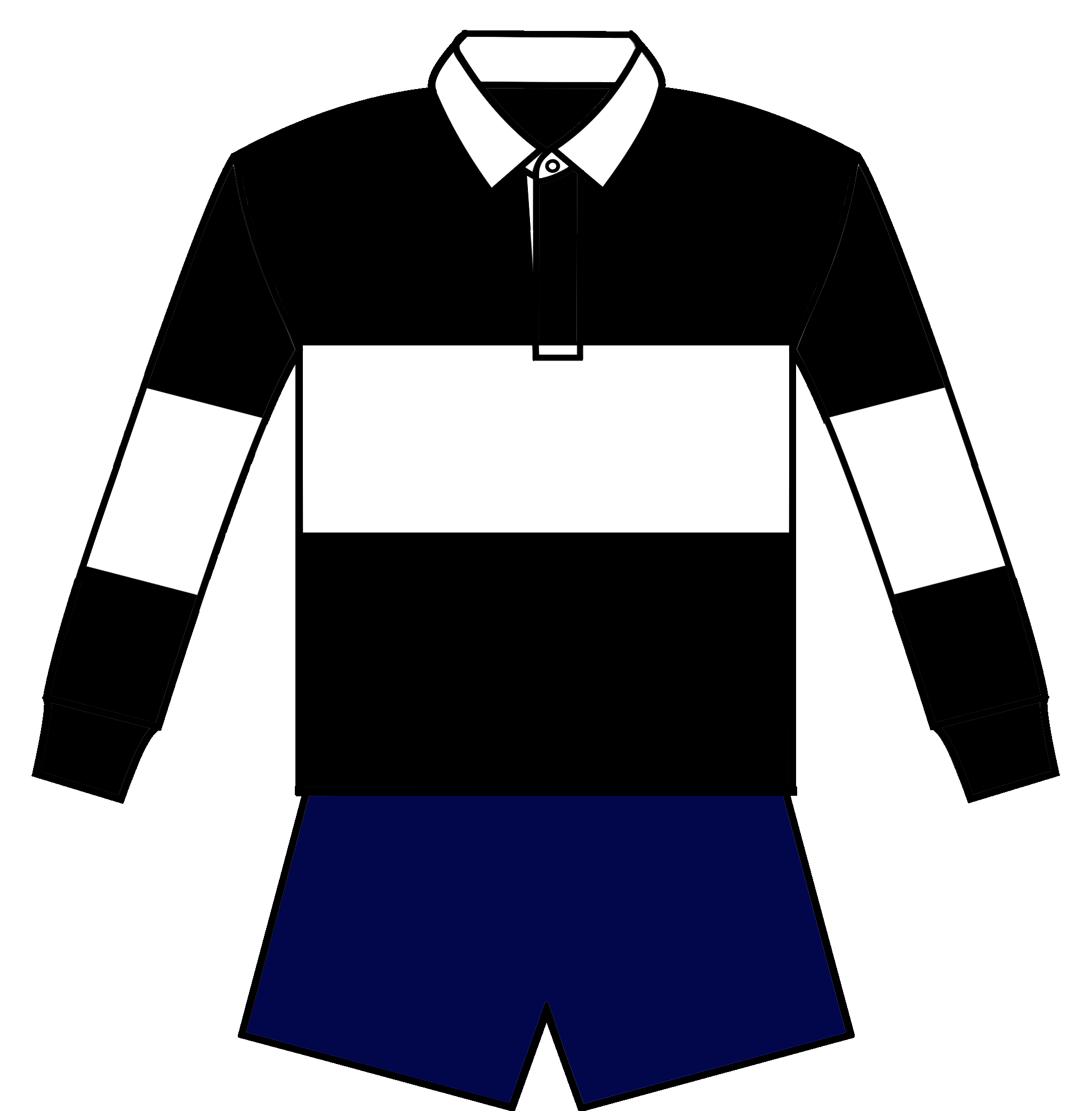
Western Suburbs 17th season Ground: Pratten Park; Coach: Albert "Ricketty" Johnston; Captains: Tedda Courtney, Clarrie Prentice

== Ladder ==
Because of the British Lions tour of Australia, and interstate matches, the 1924 season was shortened to a single round of eight matches. No club fixtures were played on the weekends of 31 May, 7 June, 21 June nor 28 June.

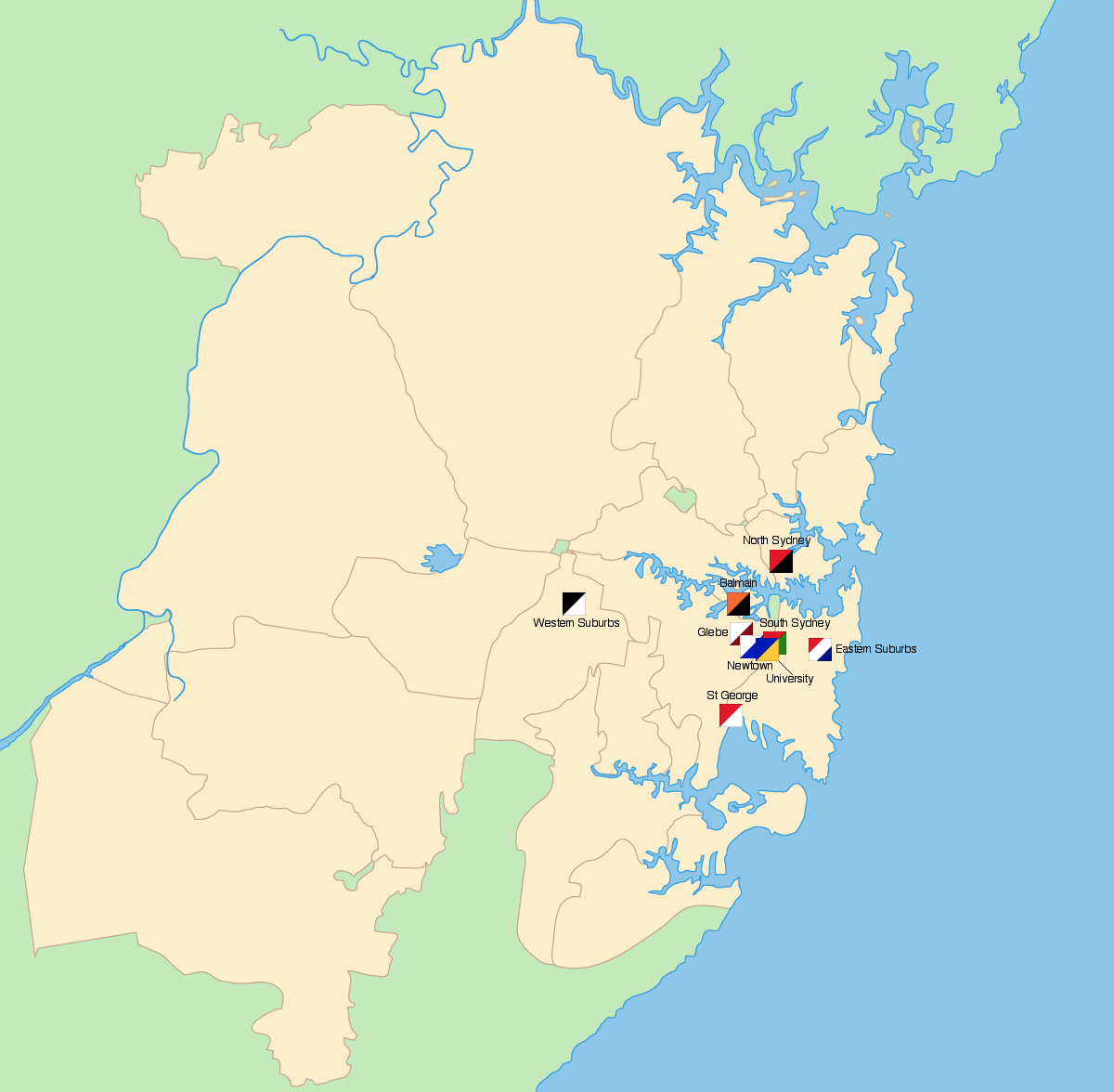
The geographical locations of the teams that contested the 1924 premiership across Sydney.

	Team	Pld	W	D	L	B	PF	PA	PD	Pts
1	Balmain	8	6	1	1	1	124	53	+71	15
2	South Sydney	8	6	1	1	1	104	60	+44	15
3	Western Suburbs	8	4	0	4	1	130	103	+27	10
4	Glebe	8	4	0	4	1	87	95	-8	10
5	St. George	8	3	2	3	1	94	125	-31	10
6	North Sydney	8	3	0	5	1	107	128	-21	8
7	Eastern Suburbs	8	3	0	5	1	85	106	-21	8
8	Sydney University	8	2	1	5	1	85	115	-30	7
9	Newtown	8	2	1	5	1	98	129	-31	7

== Premiership Final ==
Balmain	Position	South Sydney
19. Des Ponchard	FB	18. Howard Hallett
6. Jim Love	WG	14. Benny Wearing
2. Dud Millard	CE	2. Harold Horder
5. Billy Craig	CE	15. Oscar Quinlivan
16. Tommy Kennedy	WG	5. Cec Blinkhorn
1. Charles Fraser (Ca./Co.)	FE	6. Alf Blair
24. Norman Robinson	HB	32. Frank Brogan
10. Bill Schultz	PR	22. David Watson
9. Horrie Watt	HK	9. Ern Wilmot
12. Alf Fraser	PR	13. Jack Lawrence
15. Roy Liston	SR	11. Edward Root
8. Les Hayes	SR	37. Pat Murphy
14. Reg Latta	LK	21. Alby Carr
	Coach	Owen McCarthy

Balmain and South Sydney finished equal at the top of the ladder, having dropped just one game each. The teams had earlier met in Round 5, with a 10–10 draw being the result at the Sydney Cricket Ground in front of a crowd of around 16,000.

The Final was played before a crowd of around 15,000 at the Sydney Cricket Ground on 29 July 1924 and refereed by former Rabbitoh premiership winner Webby Neill. Balmain led 3–0 at half-time and both sides failed to score in the second half. The Tigers thus claimed their sixth premiership within ten years. At the time it was the lowest-scoring Final since the start of the NSWRFL premiership and the first time a team had been held scoreless in a Final.

The Final was also the first rugby league match broadcast on radio with commentary by Balmain secretary Bob Savage.

Balmain 3 (Try: Latta)

defeated

South Sydney 0

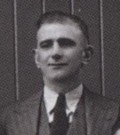
Latchem Robinson

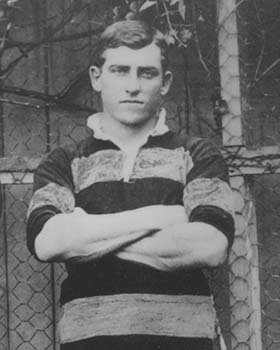
Chook Fraser

Howard Hallett

Harold Horder
