= 1914 South Sydney season =

South Sydney Rabbitohs season

- NSWRFL rank: 1st (out of 8)
- Play-off result: Premiers
- City Cup: Runners up
- 1914 record: Wins: 11; draws: 1; losses: 2
- Points scored: For: 166; against: 79

Team information
- Captain: Arthur Butler
- Stadium: Royal Agricultural Society Showground

Top scorers
- Tries: Harold Horder (22)
- Goals: Harold Horder (20)
- Points: Harold Horder (106)
← 1913	1915 →

The 1914 South Sydney Rabbitohs season was the 7th in the club's history. The club competed in the New South Wales Rugby Football League Premiership (NSWRFL), finishing the season as minor premiers, and thus, were that season's premiers. In the knock-out competition, the City Cup, South Sydney advanced to the grand final, however, they lost to Eastern Suburbs 5 – 6

== Ladder ==
	Team	Pld	W	D	L	PF	PA	PD	Pts
1	South Sydney	14	11	1	2	166	79	+87	23
2	Newtown	14	11	0	3	185	111	+74	22
3	Eastern Suburbs	14	8	0	6	164	122	+42	16
4	Balmain	14	6	4	4	132	111	+21	16
5	Glebe	14	7	1	6	187	140	+47	15
6	North Sydney	14	5	1	8	158	165	-7	11
7	Western Suburbs	14	3	0	11	104	231	-127	6
8	Annandale	14	1	1	12	106	243	-137	3

== Fixtures ==
=== Regular season ===
Round	Opponent	Result	Score	Date	Venue	Crowd	Ref
1	Balmain	Win	14 – 0	Saturday 2 May	Sydney Cricket Ground	11,000	
2	Glebe	Win	9 – 2	Saturday 9 May	Sydney Cricket Ground	25,000	
3	Western Suburbs	Win	17 – 9	Saturday 16 May	Pratten Park	1,500	
4	Eastern Suburbs	Loss	4 – 10	Saturday 23 May	Sydney Cricket Ground	26,100	
5	Newtown	Win	11 – 9	Saturday 30 May	Royal Agricultural Society Showground	12,000	
6	North Sydney	Win	19 – 6	Saturday 13 June	Sydney Cricket Ground	12,000	
7	Annandale	Win	13 – 8	Saturday 20 June	Royal Agricultural Society Showground	1,500	
8	Balmain	Draw	2 – 2	Saturday 11 July	Wentworth Oval	10,000	
9	Glebe	Win	6 – 5	Saturday 18 July	Sydney Cricket Ground	13,000	
10	Western Suburbs	Win	20 – 3	Saturday 25 July	Royal Agricultural Society Showground		
11	Eastern Suburbs	Win	10 – 5	Saturday 1 August	Sydney Cricket Ground	22,300	
12	Newtown	Loss	8 – 12	Saturday 8 August	Royal Agricultural Society Showground	18,000	
13	North Sydney	Win	19 – 3	Saturday 15 August	North Sydney Oval	5,000	
14	Annandale	Win	14 – 5	Saturday 22 August	Royal Agricultural Society Showground	8,000	

=== City Cup ===
Round	Opponent	Result	Score	Date	Venue	Crowd	Ref
Elimination	Balmain	Win	8 – 3	Saturday 29 August	Sydney Cricket Ground	10,000	
Semi-Final	North Sydney	Win	22 – 10	Saturday 5 September	Royal Agricultural Society Showground	4,000	
Grand Final	Eastern Suburbs	Loss	5 – 6	Saturday 12 September	Sydney Cricket Ground	10,000	

== Statistics ==
Name	App	T	G	FG	Pts
Harry Almond	11	1	0	0	3
Os Brown	14	4	0	0	12
Arthur Butler	17	0	0	0	0
Harry Butler	17	0	0	0	0
Bill Cann	11	3	0	0	9
Walter Davis	16	2	0	0	6
Walter Dymant	5	0	0	0	0
George Hallett	13	2	2	0	10
Eddie Hilliard	16	0	1	0	2
Harold Horder	16	22	20	0	106
Arthur McCabe	17	8	1	0	26
Eugene "Owen" McCarthy	16	0	0	0	0
Harry Nicholls	3	0	0	0	0
Hugh Norman	15	3	1	0	11
George Reynolds	8	1	2	0	7
William Spence	13	0	0	0	0
Harry Thompson	2	0	0	0	0
Hash Thompson	11	3	0	0	9
