= Ab Owen =

Ab Owen may refer to:

- David ab Owen (died 1512), Welsh abbot, and bishop of St Asaph
- Dafydd ap Ieuan ab Owen, 16th-century Welsh poet
- Thomas ab Owen, 16th-century member of parliament for Haverfordwest
- Lewis ab Owen (died 1555), member of parliament for Merioneth
- Lewis ab Owen ap Meurig (died 1590), member of parliament for Anglesey
- Ifan ab Owen Edwards (1895–1970), founder of Urdd Gobaith Cymru
- Rhys ab Owen, member of the Senedd for the South Wales Central region

== See also ==
- Ab Owain
- Bowen (surname)
- Bowens (surname)
- Bown
- Bowne
- Bownes
- Owen (name)
- Owens (surname)
