= Ab Owain =

ab Owain
Origin
- Region of origin: Wales

Other names
- Variant forms: Bohan, Bowan, Bowane, Bowen, Bowene, Bowens, Bowin, Bown, Bowne, Eugene, Ewen, (Eoghan), Owen (Owain), Owens

Ab Owain is a Celtic surname from the Welsh ab Owain meaning "son of Owen" (Owen meaning 'noble')

== List of people surnamed ab Owain ==
- Cadwgan ab Owain (died 951), joint king of Glywysing in Wales, brother of Gruffydd
- Einion ab Owain (died c. 984), prince of the House of Dinefwr, in Wales
- Gruffydd ab Owain (died 935), joint king of Glywysing in Wales, brother of Cadwgan
- Gwenwynwyn ab Owain (died c. 1216), king in central Wales
- Hywel ab Owain (died 1043), king of a part of Glywysing in Wales
- Ieuan Ddu ab Dafydd ab Owain (fl. 1440–1480), Welsh poet
- Maredudd ab Owain (died 999), 10th-century king in Wales
- Morgan Hen ab Owain (died 974), king of Gwent, Wales
- Rhys ab Owain (died 1078), king of Deheubarth in southern Wales
- Robin Llwyd ab Owain (born 1959), Welsh poet and author

== See also ==
- Ab Owen
- Bowen (surname)
- Bowens (surname)
- Bown
- Bowne
- Bownes
- Owen (name)
- Owens (surname)
