= 1912 South Sydney season =

Rugby league team season

- NSWRFL rank: 4th (out of 8)
- Play-off result: Did not qualify
- City Cup: Winners
- 1912 record: Wins: 8; draws: 0; losses: 6
- Points scored: For: 207; against: 137

Team information
- Captain: Arthur Butler
- Stadium: Sydney Sports Ground

Top scorers
- Tries: Arthur McCabe (11)
- Goals: Stephen Darmody (21)
- Points: Stephen Darmody (57)
← 1911	1913 →

The 1912 South Sydney season was the 5th in the club's history. The club competed in the New South Wales Rugby Football League Premiership (NSWRFL), finishing the season 4th and missing the finals for the first time in club history. Souths also competed in the inaugural season of the post season tournament, the City Cup. The competition culminated with Souths defeating Glebe in the final.

== Ladder ==
	Team	Pld	W	D	L	PF	PA	PD	Pts
1	Eastern Suburbs	14	13	0	1	230	86	+144	26
2	Glebe	14	11	0	3	199	83	+116	22
3	Newtown	14	9	0	5	178	132	+46	18
4	South Sydney	14	8	0	6	207	137	+70	16
5	Balmain	14	6	0	8	138	168	-30	12
6	North Sydney	14	6	0	8	124	197	-73	12
7	Annandale	14	2	0	12	86	134	-48	4
8	Western Suburbs	14	1	0	13	100	325	-225	2

== Fixtures ==
=== Regular season (NSWRFL) ===
Round	Opponent	Result	Score	Date	Venue	Crowd	Ref
1	North Sydney	Win	16 – 3	Saturday 4 May	North Sydney Oval	5,000	
2	Newtown	Win	12 – 6	Saturday 11 May	Sports Ground	15,000	
3	Eastern Suburbs	Loss	8 – 9	Saturday 18 May	Royal Agricultural Society Showground	18,000	
4	Balmain	Win	29 – 5	Saturday 25 May	Birchgrove Oval	6,000	
5	Western Suburbs	Win	26 – 10	Saturday 8 June	Sports Ground	400	
6	Annandale	Win	12 – 5	Saturday 15 June	Sports Ground	6,000	
7	Glebe	Loss	5 – 6	Saturday 29 June	Sports Ground	15,000	
8	North Sydney	Loss	7 – 18	Saturday 6 July	Sports Ground	4,500	
9	Newtown	Win	20 – 13	Saturday 20 July	Sports Ground	10,000	
10	Eastern Suburbs	Loss	10 – 7	Saturday 27 July	Sports Ground	14,000	
11	Balmain	Loss	5 – 14	Saturday 3 August	Birchgrove Oval	1,200	
12	Western Suburbs	Win	33 – 12	Saturday 10 August	Sports Ground	400	
13	Annandale	Win	11 – 7	Saturday 17 August	Sports Ground	4,000	
14	Glebe	Loss	16 – 19	Saturday 24 August	Wentworth Park	4,000	

=== City Cup ===
Round	Opponent	Result	Score	Date	Venue	Crowd	Ref
Preliminary Final	Eastern Suburbs	Win	21 – 10	Saturday 31 August	Sports Ground	11,000	
Semi Final	North Sydney	Win	16 – 11	Saturday 7 September	Sports Ground	10,000	
Final	Glebe	Win	30 – 5	Saturday 14 September	Royal Agricultural Society Showground	13,000	

== Statistics ==
Name	App	T	G	FG	Pts
Harry Almond	4	0	0	0	0
Os Brown	9	2	0	0	6
Arthur Butler	17	2	2	0	10
Harold Butler	17	0	0	0	0
William "Billy" Cann	9	3	0	0	9
Charlie Collier	13	10	0	0	30
Stephen Darmody	7	5	21	0	57
Walter Davis	9	2	0	0	6
Herbert "Herb" Gilbert	7	2	0	0	6
Dick Green	6	0	0	0	0
Bill Groves	2	2	0	0	6
Perce Hale	5	0	0	0	0
George Hallett	9	0	0	0	0
Eddie Hilliard	13	0	0	0	0
Clarence Horder	1	1	0	0	3
Harold Horder	4	5	12	0	39
Ernie Hucker	9	2	0	0	6
John Leveson	5	0	0	0	0
Arthur McCabe	16	11	0	0	33
Tom McCann	1	0	0	0	0
Eugene McCarthy	8	0	0	0	0
George Maidment	6	1	12	0	27
Harry Nicholls	12	5	0	0	15
Edward Rigney	1	0	0	0	0
A. Smith	3	1	0	0	3
William Spence	14	3	0	0	9
Hash Thompson	14	3	0	0	9
Total	221	60	47	0	274
