= 1911 South Sydney season =

- NSWRFL rank: 3rd (out of 8)
- Play-off result: Lost Elimination Final
- 1911 record: Wins: 9; draws: 2; losses: 3
- Points scored: For: 188; against: 117

Team information
- Captain: William Cann
- Stadium: Royal Agricultural Society Showground Sydney Sports Ground

Top scorers
- Tries: Arthur McCabe (11)
- Goals: Walter Dymant (5)
- Points: Arthur McCabe (35)
← 1910	1912 →

The 1911 South Sydney Rabbitohs season was the 4th in the club's history. The club competed in the New South Wales Rugby Football League Premiership (NSWRFL), finishing the season 3rd. The top two teams were to play each other for the grand final, however South Sydney and Eastern Suburbs both finished second on the ladder with 20 points. An addition playoff game was put in place to decide who would play Glebe in the final. Souths lost 23–10.

== Ladder ==
	Team	Pld	W	D	L	PF	PA	PD	Pts
1	Glebe	14	11	0	3	244	88	+156	22
2	Eastern Suburbs	14	9	2	3	208	129	+79	20
3	South Sydney	14	9	2	3	188	117	+71	20
4	Newtown	14	6	3	5	154	120	+34	15
5	Annandale	14	5	1	8	113	184	-71	11
6	North Sydney	14	4	1	9	138	209	-71	9
7	Western Suburbs	14	4	1	9	116	189	-73	9
8	Balmain	14	3	0	11	130	255	-125	6

== Fixtures ==
=== Regular season ===
Round	Opponent	Result	Score	Date	Venue	Crowd	Ref
1	North Sydney	Win	25 – 5	Saturday 29 April	Sports Ground	5,000	
2	Glebe	Win	11 – 7	Saturday 6 May	Wentworth Park	10,000	
3	Newtown	Draw	7 – 7	Saturday 13 May	Royal Agricultural Society Showground	15,000	
4	Annandale	Win	30 – 14	Saturday 20 May	Wentworth Park	3,000	
5	Western Suburbs	Win	13 – 8	Saturday 27 May	Metters Stadium	1,000	
6	Balmain	Win	24 – 10	Saturday 17 June	Royal Agricultural Society Showground	5,000	
7	Eastern Suburbs	Win	12 – 8	Saturday 1 July	Sports Ground	10,000	
8	Newtown	Draw	3 – 3	Saturday 8 July	Royal Agricultural Society Showground	18,000	
9	Annanadale	Win	8 – 0	Saturday 22 July	Sports Ground	3,000	
10	Glebe	Loss	5 – 9	Saturday 29 July	Sports Ground	16,000	
11	Eastern Suburbs	Loss	11 – 24	Saturday 5 August	Sports Ground	15,000	
12	North Sydney	Win	13 – 8	Saturday 12 August	North Sydney Oval	2,500	
13	Western Suburbs	Win	20 – 7	Saturday 19 August	Sports Ground	2,500	
14	Balmain	Loss	3 – 9	Saturday 26 August	Birchgrove Oval	1,000	

=== Finals ===
Eastern Suburbs 23 (Tries: Dally Messenger 2, Eddie White; Goals: Dally Messenger 7)

defeated

South Sydney 10 (Tries: Eddie Hilliard, Arthur McCabe; Goals: Wally Dymant 2)
