= Walter Owen (disambiguation) =

Walter Owen (1884–1963) was a Scottish translator, known for his work in Argentina.

Walter Owen may also refer to

- Walter C. Owen (1868–1934), American jurist and politician
- Walter Richard Owen (1880–1959), British politician
- Walter Stewart Owen (1904–1981), Canadian lieutenant governor

== See also ==
- Walter Owens, Negro league baseball player
- Owen Walter, Canadian ice hockey player
