= Ywain (disambiguation) =

Ywain, also called Owain, Yvain, Ewain or Uwain, is a Knight of the Round Table in the Arthurian legend.

Ywain may also refer to:

- Owain mab Urien, historical figure
- Ywain the Bastard, another Knight of the Round Table
- Yvain, the Knight of the Lion, a 12th-century romance by Chrétien de Troyes
- Owain, or the Lady of the Fountain, a Welsh adaptation of Chrétien's Yvain
- 9501 Ywain, minor planet
- Yvaine, a fictional character in Stardust

== See also ==
- Owain, name
