= Bowens (surname) =

Bowens is a surname of Welsh origin, it is an alteration of Bowen with English patronymic-s. Modified spelling of Dutch Bouwens, an alteration of Bauwens.

- Chauncey Bowens (born 2006), American football player
- David Bowens (born 1977), American football player
- Tom Bowens (born 1940), American basketball player

== See also ==
- Ab Owen
- Ab Owain
- Bowen (surname)
- Bown
- Bowne
- Owen (name), given name and surname
- Owens (surname)
