= 1913 South Sydney season =

- NSWRFL rank: 3rd (out of 8)
- Play-off result: Did not qualify
- City Cup: Lost semi-final
- 1913 record: Wins: 8; draws: 0; losses: 6
- Points scored: For: 200; against: 132

Team information
- Coach: John Rosewell
- Captain: Arthur Butler
- Stadium: Sydney Sports Ground

Top scorers
- Tries: Harold Horder (13)
- Goals: George Hallett & Harold Horder (12)
- Points: Harold Horder (65)
← 1912	1914 →

The 1913 South Sydney season was the 6th in the club's history. The club competed in the New South Wales Rugby Football League Premiership (NSWRFL), finishing the season 3rd. In the knock-out competition, the City Cup, South Sydney lost the semi-final 19-10 to the eventual runner-ups of the competition - North Sydney.

== Ladder ==
	Team	Pld	W	D	L	PF	PA	PD	Pts
1	Eastern Suburbs	14	12	0	2	227	118	+109	24
2	Newtown	14	10	1	3	203	135	+68	21
3	South Sydney	14	9	0	5	200	132	+68	18
4	Glebe	14	8	0	6	198	161	+37	16
5	North Sydney	14	5	2	7	199	193	+6	12
6	Balmain	14	4	1	9	83	135	-52	9
7	Annandale	14	3	0	11	119	219	-100	6
8	Western Suburbs	14	3	0	11	115	251	-136	6

== Fixtures ==
Round	Opponent	Result	Score	Date	Venue	Crowd	Ref
1	Western Suburbs	Win	33 – 11	Saturday 3 May	Pratten Park	2,000	
2	Annandale	Win	10 – 4	Saturday 10 May	Sports Ground	7,000	
3	Balmain	Win	16 – 10	Saturday 17 May	Sydney Cricket Ground	25,000	
4	Newtown	Loss	13 – 16	Saturday 24 May	Sydney Cricket Ground	11,000	
5	Glebe	Win	9 – 16	Saturday 31 June	Sydney Cricket Ground	27,000	
6	Eastern Suburbs	Loss	0 – 12	Saturday 14 June	Sydney Cricket Ground	23,000	
7	North Sydney	Win	8 – 5	Saturday 28 June	Sports Ground	4,000	
8	Western Suburbs	Win	29 – 5	Saturday 5 July	Sports Ground	1,500	
9	Annandale	Win	31 – 7	Saturday 12 July	Sports Ground	6,000	
10	Balmain	Loss	6 – 14	Saturday 19 July	Birchgrove Oval	6,000	
11	Newtown	Win	14 – 5	Saturday 26 July	Sydney Cricket Ground	20,000	
12	Glebe	Win	15 – 6	Saturday 2 August	Wentworth Oval	8,000	
13	Eastern Suburbs	Loss	7 – 14	Saturday 9 August	Sports Ground	25,000	
14	North Sydney	Loss	9 – 17	Saturday 16 August	North Sydney Oval	5,000	
