= 1915 South Sydney season =

South Sydney Rabbitohs season

- NSWRFL rank: 4th (out of 8)
- Play-off result: Did not qualify
- City Cup: Lost Qualifying Final
- 1915 record: Wins: 8; draws: 1; losses: 5
- Points scored: For: 157; against: 94

Team information
- Captain: Arthur Butler
- Stadium: Royal Agricultural Society Showground
- Avg. attendance: 9,000

Top scorers
- Tries: Harold Horder (9)
- Goals: Harold Horder (23)
- Points: Harold Horder (73)
← 1914	1916 →

The 1915 South Sydney Rabbitohs season was the 8th in the club's history. The club competed in the New South Wales Rugby Football League Premiership (NSWRFL), finishing the season 4th.

== Ladder ==
	Team	Pld	W	D	L	PF	PA	PD	Pts
1	Balmain	14	12	2	0	232	71	+161	26
2	Glebe	14	12	0	2	268	106	+162	24
3	Newtown	14	9	1	4	208	119	+89	19
4	South Sydney	14	8	1	5	157	94	+63	17
5	Eastern Suburbs	14	6	0	8	180	109	+71	12
6	Annandale	14	3	0	11	113	256	-143	6
7	Western Suburbs	14	2	0	12	67	200	-133	4
8	North Sydney	14	2	0	12	83	353	-270	4

== Fixtures ==
=== Regular season ===
Round	Opponent	Result	Score	Date	Venue	Crowd	Ref
1	Glebe	Loss	7 – 17	Saturday 8 May	Sydney Cricket Ground	12,850	
2	Newtown	Win	8 – 7	Saturday 15 May	Sydney Cricket Ground	15,000	
3	Annandale	Win	14 – 5	Saturday 22 May	Wentworth Oval	2,000	
4	Western Suburbs	Win	30 – 3	Saturday 29 May	Erskineville Oval	4,000	
5	North Sydney	Win	19 – 5	Saturday 12 June	North Sydney Oval	3,000	
6	Eastern Suburbs	Win	10 – 7	Saturday 19 June	Royal Agricultural Society Showground	12,000	
7	Balmain	Draw	10 – 10	Saturday 26 June	Royal Agricultural Society Showground	28,000	
8	Glebe	Loss	3 – 14	Saturday 3 July	Sydney Cricket Ground	15,000	
9	Newtown	Loss	5 – 7	Saturday 10 July	Royal Agricultural Society Showground	13,500	
10	Annandale	Loss	2 – 3	Saturday 17 July	Erskineville Oval	2,000	
11	Western Suburbs	Win	11 – 3	Saturday 31 July	St. Luke's Park	200	
12	North Sydney	Win	29 – 3	Saturday 7 August	North Sydney Oval	1,000	
13	Eastern Suburbs	Win	5 – 3	Saturday 14 August	Royal Agricultural Society Showground	6,000	
14	Balmain	Loss	4 – 7	Saturday 21 August	Royal Agricultural Society Showground	15,000	

=== City Cup ===
Round	Opponent	Result	Score	Date	Venue	Crowd	Ref
Qualifying Final	Eastern Suburbs	Loss	3 – 6	Saturday 28 August	Royal Agricultural Society Showground	6,000	
