= Dud Millard =

Australian rugby league footballer (1901–1954)

Personal information
- Full name: Dudley Stewart Hamilton Millard
- Born: 18 April 1901 Taree, New South Wales, Australia
- Died: 5 October 1954 (aged 53) Five Dock, New South Wales, Australia

Playing information
- Position: Wing, Centre
Club
Years	Team	Pld	T	G	FG	P
1922–26	Balmain	48	13	1	0	41
Representative
Years	Team	Pld	T	G	FG	P
1924	New South Wales	3	0	0	0	0
1925	Metropolis	1	0	0	0	0
- Source: As of 17 June 2019

Dudley Stewart Hamilton 'Dud' Millard (April 18, 1901 - October 5, 1954) was an Australian premiership winning rugby league footballer who played in the 1920s.

== Background ==
Millard was born at Taree, New South Wales to parents Alfred and Mary Millard in 1901.

== Playing career ==
The family moved to Balmain and Millard came through the junior ranks to be graded with the Balmain club in 1920. Millard played five seasons of first grade league with Balmain between 1922 and 1926, and played centre in the side that won the 1924 Grand Final defeating South Sydney 3–0. As of the 2019 NRL season, this is the lowest score in a grand final.

His only representative appearances came in 1924 and 1925, when he was selected to play three games for New South Wales and once in 1925 for Metropolis.

== Death ==
Millard died on 5 October 1954, aged 53, late of Five Dock, New South Wales.
