= Owain Jones =

Owain Jones may refer to:

- Owain Jones (geographer) (born 1957), professor of environmental humanities
- Owain Jones (footballer, born 1996), Welsh footballer
- Owain Tudur Jones (born 1984), Welsh footballer
- Owain Jones (priest) (1921–1995), Welsh Anglican priest
- Owain Jones (cricketer) (born 1992), English cricketer
