= Roy Liston =

Australian rugby league footballer

Personal information
- Full name: Reginald Roy Liston
- Born: 25 July 1896 Newtown, New South Wales
- Died: 13 August 1977 (aged 81) Concord, New South Wales

Playing information
- Position: Front row
Club
Years	Team	Pld	T	G	FG	P
1920	Annandale	12	1	2	0	7
1921–22	Balmain	12	2	6	0	18
1923	Glebe	5	1	2	0	7
1924	Balmain	8	0	2	0	4
1926–27	Western Suburbs	10	0	8	0	16
	Total	47	4	20	0	52

Reginald Roy Liston (1896–1977) was an Australian rugby league footballer who played in the 1910s and 1920s.

== Playing career ==
Liston's rugby league career began after returning from the Western Front in World War I. In 1920, Roy Liston turned our for Annandale in the club's final year in 1920. He then transferred to Balmain Tigers for two years between 1921 and 1922. He switched to Glebe in 1923, before returning to Balmain the following year and won the premiership with them in the 1924 Grand Final. He lastly joined Western Suburbs Magpies for three seasons between 1926 and 1928.

Liston died on 13 August 1977, aged 81.
