= No One but You (EP) =

EP by Natasha Owens
- Released: August 28, 2015
- Genre: Worship, CCM
- Length: 22:02
- Label: MaHarlow
- Producer: Ed Cash

Natasha Owens chronology
| I Made it Through (2013) | No One but You (2015) |

No One but You is the first extended play from Natasha Owens. MaHarlow Records released the EP on August 28, 2015. She worked with Ed Cash, in the production of this extended play.

== Critical reception ==
Professional ratings
Review scores
| Source | Rating |
|---|---|
| 365 Days of Inspiring Media | 4/5 stars |
| CCM Magazine | 3.5/5 stars |
| New Release Today | 4/5 stars |

Awarding the EP three and a half stars for CCM Magazine, Andy Argyrakis states, "With a radiant voice and clean contemporary pop arrangements...Natasha Owens makes significant strides on her second national release." Caitlin Lassiter, giving the EP four stars at New Release Today, writes, "Natasha's strong and soaring voice carries each song beautifully with conviction behind each word she sings, and produces a promising album." Reviewing the extended play from Soul-Audio, Andrew Greenhalgh says, "No One But You showcases an artist who truly has all the goods." Sarah Baylor, indicating in a 3.6 out of five review by The Christian Beat, describes, "No One But You, is uplifting and worshipful". Rating the EP four stars at 365 Days of Inspiring Media, says, "such a compelling and heartfelt EP."

== Track listing ==
No One but You track listing
| No. | Title | Length |
|---|---|---|
| 1. | "No One but You" | 4:33 |
| 2. | "We Will Rise" | 4:41 |
| 3. | "Wings" | 4:15 |
| 4. | "Move Me On" | 3:49 |
| 5. | "One Name" | 4:44 |
| Total length: | | 22:02 |
