= Dafydd ap Ieuan ab Owen =

Dafydd ap Ieuan ab Owen was a 16th-century Welsh poet.

He wrote cywyddau and englynion, some of which associate him with the Harlech area. A number of examples of his work are held by the National Library of Wales.
