= Billy Craig (rugby league) =

Australian rugby league footballer

Personal information
- Full name: William Henry Craig
- Born: 30 November 1898 Balmain, New South Wales, Australia
- Died: 26 November 1980 (aged 81)

Playing information
- Position: Centre, Wing, Fullback
Club
Years	Team	Pld	T	G	FG	P
1922–25	Balmain	40	11	0	0	33

Billy Craig was an Australian professional rugby league footballer who played in the 1920s. He played for Balmain as a centre but also played as a winger and a fullback.

== Playing career ==
Craig made his debut for Balmain in 1922 against Eastern Suburbs at Birchgrove Oval which ended in a 4–4 draw.

In 1924, Craig moved to the centres and was a member of the 1924 premiership winning side defeating South Sydney 3–0 in the grand final. Craig played one more season before retiring at the end of 1925.
