= Bouwens =

Bouwens is a Dutch patronymic surname meaning "Bouwe's son". Bouwe is a short form of the given name Boudewijn. Variant forms are Bauwens, Boudens, Bouwen, Bouwense and Bouwes. People with the surname include:

- Antonius Bouwens (1876–1963), Dutch sports shooter, brother of Herman
- Elise Bouwens (born 1991), Dutch swimmer
- Hans Bouwens (born 1944), Dutch singer and songwriter known as "George Baker"
- Herman Bouwens (1868–1955), Dutch sports shooter, brother of Antoine
- Leenaert Bouwens (1515–1582), Dutch Mennonite leader
- Maarten Bouwens (1511–1583), Dutch theologian and first bishop of Ypres
- Richard Bouwens van der Boijen (1863–1939), French architect
- Rychard Bouwens (born 1972), American astronomer at Leiden University

== See also ==
- Bauwens, variant spelling of the surname, more common in Belgium
- Bouwe Bekking (born 1963), Dutch competitive sailor
