= Jack Courtney (rugby league) =

Australian rugby league player (1901–1948)

Personal information
- Full name: John David Courtney
- Born: 1901 St. Leonards, New South Wales, Australia
- Died: 9 March 1948 (aged 46–47) St. Leonards, New South Wales, Australia

Playing information
- Position: Five-eighth, Centre, Wing
Club
Years	Team	Pld	T	G	FG	P
1923–31	North Sydney	83	23	112	0	293
Representative
Years	Team	Pld	T	G	FG	P
1924	New South Wales	3	2	3	0	12
- Source: As of 13 February 2019

John David Courtney (1901-1948) was an Australian rugby league footballer who played in the 1920s and 1930s.

== Life and career ==
Born at St. Leonards, New South Wales in 1901, Courtney played his entire career at North Sydney.

He played with them for seven seasons between 1924-1931 and was a prolific point scorer for the club. He became the NSWRFL top point scorer in 1924 and 1926.

== Death ==
Courtney died on 9 March 1948 at Royal North Shore Hospital, age 47.
