= Owen Kydd =

Canadian artist

- Born: 1975 (age 50–51); Calgary, Alberta

Owen Kydd (born 1975) is a Canadian artist who works primarily with film, video and photography.

== Early life and education ==
Kydd holds a Bachelor of Fine Arts degree from Simon Fraser University and a Master of Fine Arts degree from UCLA.

== Art career ==
In 2006, he started exhibiting documentary-related videos that he called “durational photographs,” although he has since also branched out into various forms of digital art.

His work has been exhibited extensively, including solo shows at the Vancouver Art Gallery and the Musée des beaux-arts de Montréal, and group shows at SFMoMA, the Albright-Knox Gallery, the Metropolitan Museum of Art, the International Center for Photography, and the Ontario Art Gallery.

In 2015, he was shortlisted for the AIMIA AGO Photography Prize.

== Critical reception ==
The critic Walter Benn Michaels has described Kydd's exploration of the line between video, cinema, and photography in the following way: “It’s thus the photographic and the cinematic that provide the terms in which Kydd understands his work, and inasmuch as the videos are neither photographs nor movies, video functions for him less as a medium in itself than as a technology for addressing the relation between the photograph and the movie, for, more precisely, turning the cinematic into the photographic.” As Aaron Peck wrote in Artforum, “Kydd employs contemporary technologies to expand the boundaries of pictorial depiction while representing quotidian images of North American life in the early twenty-first century, capturing the specific details that signal the time in which we live.” His work has been written about it in numerous other places as well, such as Canadian Art, Foam magazine, Frieze magazine, and Aperture magazine.

== Collections ==
His work is in the collections of the Metropolitan Museum of Art, SF MoMA, and the Albright–Knox Art Gallery.
