= Natasha Owens =

American Christian musician (born 1976)

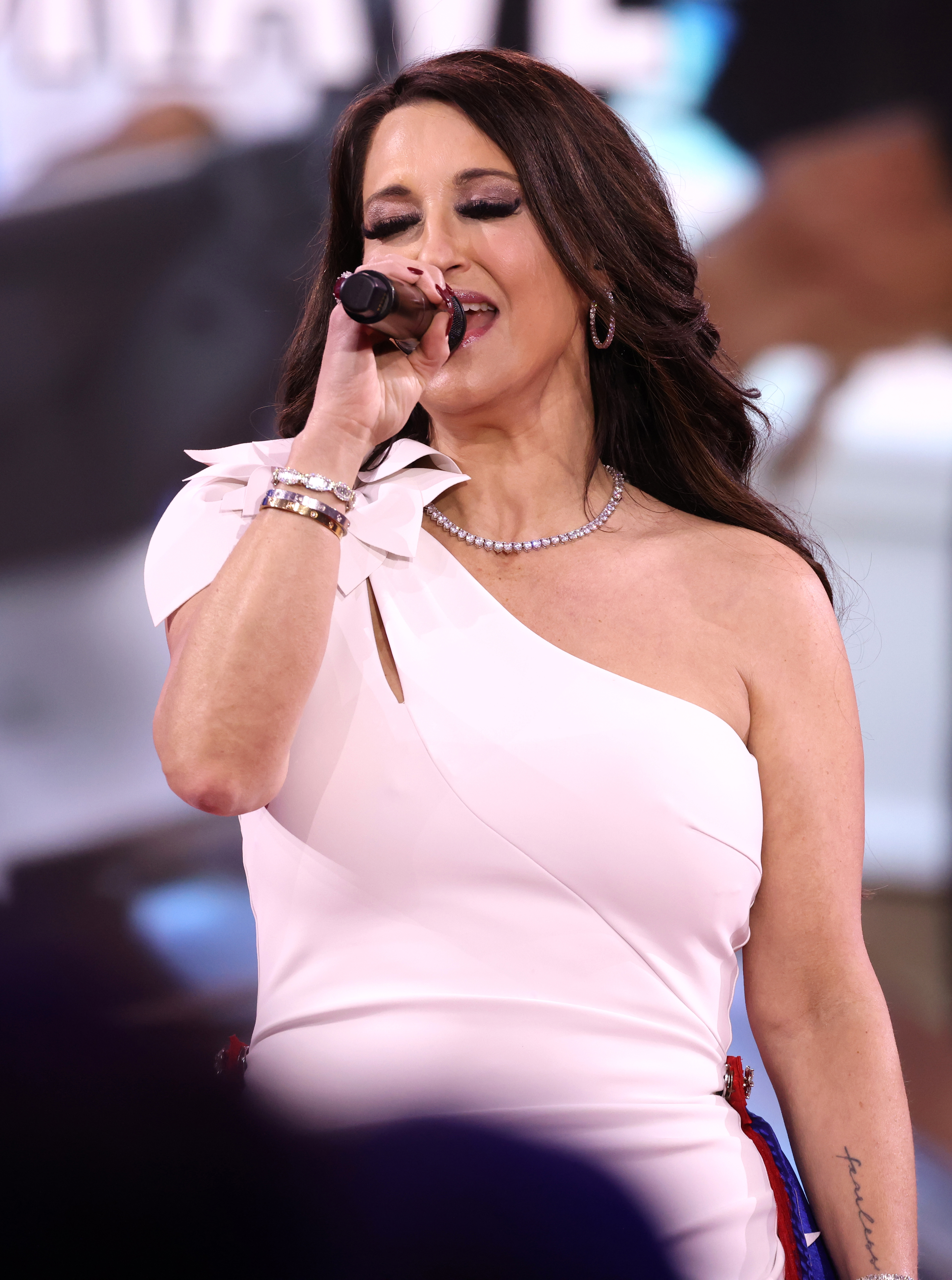
- Owens performing in 2025

Background information
- Born: Natasha Michell Harlow; May 20, 1976 (age 50)
- Origin: Dallas, Texas
- Genres: Contemporary worship music, contemporary Christian music
- Occupations: Singer, songwriter
- Instruments: Vocals, singer-songwriter
- Years active: 2013–present
- Website: natashaowensmusic.com

Natasha Michell Owens (née, Harlow; born May 20, 1976) is an American Christian musician, who primarily plays a contemporary Christian music style of contemporary worship music.

== Early life ==
Natasha Michell Harlow was born on May 20, 1976, to father Herbert Michael Wayne Harlow and mother Sharon Darlene Harlow (née Murrell). She grew up in Arlington, Texas, and relocated to Dallas, Texas, after she got married. Her father died of a self-inflicted involuntary gunshot wound to the chest on May 6, 2010, while he was cleaning one of his firearms. This was the basis for her first album.

== Music career ==
Owens' music recording career commenced in 2013 with the studio album I Made it Through, which was released on May 18, 2013. Her second release, the extended play No One but You, was released on August 28, 2015. She released her second studio album, We Will Rise, on July 7, 2017. Owens released a third project, Warrior, followed by a holiday album, Christmas Memories, in the fall of 2020. Her album Stand was released in 2021.

In 2023, Owens released the song "Trump Won", which promoted the false claim that Donald Trump won the 2020 United States presidential election. The single debuted at number two on the Billboard Country Digital Song Sales chart.

In 2024, Owens released the song "The Chosen One", which promoted her belief that "God has chosen President Trump to push back against the evil in our country and the evil in this world."

== Personal life ==
She married David Lynn Owens on April 5, 1995 in Fort Worth, Texas, where they reside. They have two sons.

== Discography ==
Studio albums

- I Made it Through (May 18, 2013, Independent)
- We Will Rise (July 7, 2017, Independent)
- Warrior (March 29, 2019)
- Christmas Memories (November 13, 2020)
- Stand (August 6, 2021)

EPs

- No One but You (August 28, 2015, Independent)
