= Owain Jones (geographer) =

British geographer

Owain Jones FGS (born 1957, Newport, Wales) is a Professor of Environmental Humanities at Bath Spa University (UK). He was previously Reader in Cultural Geography: Place, Nature and Landscape (previously Senior Research Fellow) at the Countryside & Community Research Institute (which is a joint Institute of the Universities of the West of England and Gloucestershire and the Royal Agricultural College and Hartpury College) and member of staff of the Department of Geography and Environmental Management, Faculty of Environment and Technology, University of the West of England.

He works mainly in cultural geography and has published a number of peer-reviewed research articles in international geography and related social science journals. He has two main areas of research and writing interests; geographies of nature-culture and children's geographies. Within the former he focuses upon animal geographies, place/landscape/dwelling, and tidal geographies (and temporal rhythms of landscape).

== Biography ==
Jones undertook a BA in 3D Design/Construction at Bristol Polytechnic, graduating in 1981, an MA /Postgraduate Diploma in Environmental Policy and Geography, University of the West of England, 1993, MSc. in Society and Space, University of Bristol, 1993, MA in Creative Writing, BSUC, 2004 and completed his PhD in the Dept of Geography, University of Bristol in 1997. He has conducted research variously funded by the ESRC, AHRC, and RCUK (RELU). He has also written on geography, non-representational theory and pragmatism. and geography and memory.

His work is of significance in the area of geographies nature-culture. That is – a view of nature-society relations which seeks to understand the interdependency between the human and non-human world. This draws upon, and contributes to, a range of theories including Actor Network Theory (ANT); dwelling; hybridity; new dialectics; new approaches to place; and new ecologies.

The importance of his work is reflected in the selection of an extract from the book "Tree Cultures: The Place of Trees, and Trees in their Place, for the “Nature” section of The Cultural Geography Reader edited by Oakes and Price. This extract sits alongside other seminal writings on nature by Raymond Williams, Clarence J. Glacken, Alexander Wilson and others. Because of his work in this field, Owain Jones was selected to write the "Nature-Culture" and "Dwelling" entries for the International Encyclopaedia of Human Geography.

Owain Jones's influential 1995 paper on discourses of rurality has been recently republished as part of the Journal of Rural Studies' 25th anniversary.

He has also been an invited speaker at a number of major international academic conferences on rurality, human-animal interactions, and geographies of forests, places and landscapes.

In the area of children's geographies Owain Jones has pioneered the idea of the "otherness of children". This has been taken up by other academics such as Karen Lury.

Owain Jones is also founder and Chair of Priston Festival, a community art and music festival near the city of Bath, Somerset, south west England.

== Current academic positions and affiliations ==
- Chair of the Royal Geographical Society Research Group on Children, Youth and Families
- Committee member of the Royal Geographical Society Cultural and Social Geography Research Group
- Associate Editor of the journal of Children's Geographies.
- Associate member of Land2 (a UK based practice-led research network of artists and academics with interests in landscape / place-oriented art practice).
- Fellow of the Royal Geographical Society and Research Group committee member

== Recent publications by year since 2000 ==
- Book. Jones O., and Cloke P., (2002) Tree Cultures: The Place of Trees, and Trees in their Place, Oxford: Berg, 252pp.
- Val Steeves and Owain Jones (2010) Editorial: Surveillance and Children. Surveillance & Society 7(3/4): 187–191.
- Jones O., ‘The Breath of the Moon’: The Rhythmic and Affective Time-spaces of UK Tides, in T. Edensor (ed) Geographies of Rhythm, Oxford: Ashgate, pp 189–203.
- Jones O., 'Dwelling' in R. Kitchen and N. Thrift (eds.), International Encyclopaedia of Human Geography, London: Elsevier, vol 3: 266–272.
- Jones O., 'Nature-Cultures' in R. Kitchen and N. Thrift (eds.), International Encyclopaedia of Human Geography, London: Elsevier, vol 7: 309–323.
- Jones O., 'After Nature: Entangled Worlds’ in N. Castree, D. Demeritt, D. Liverman and B. Rhoads, (eds.), A Companion to Environmental Geography Oxford: Blackwell Publishing pp 294–312.
- Jones O. 'Approaching the otherness of childhood; methodological considerations', in Van Blerk, L. and Kesby, M. (eds) Doing Children's Geographies: Methodological Issues in Research with Young People, London: Routledge, pp 195–212.
- Jones O., and Cloke P., ‘Orchard’ in T. S. Oakes and P. L. Price (eds) The Cultural Geography Reader, London: Routledge, pp 232–240.
- Jones O., and Cloke P., ‘Non-human agencies: tree is place and time’, in C. Knappett and L. Malafouris, (eds.) Material Agency: towards a non-anthropocentric approach, Guilford: Springer. pp 79–96.
- Jones O., 'Of Trees and Trails: place in a globalised world’, in N. Clark, D. Massey, and P. Sarre (eds.) Material Geographies: A World in the Making, London: Sage in association with the Open University, pp 214–264.
- Jones O., '"True geography [ ] quickly forgotten, giving away to an adult-imagined universe". Approaching the otherness of childhood'. Children's Geographies, 8, 2, pp 195–212.
- Jones O., 'Stepping from the Wreckage: Non-representational theory and the promise of pragmatism’ in special issue on Pragmatism and Geography, Geoforum, edited by N. Wood and S. Smith, Geoforum, 39, 1600–1612.
- Brown B., Laurier E,. Lorimer H,. Jones O., Juhlin O., Noble A., Perry M., Pica D., Sormani. P., Strebel I., Swan L., Taylor A., Watts L. and Weilenmann A., 'Driving and passengering: notes on the natural organisation of ordinary car travel’ Mobilities, Volume 3, Issue 1, pp 1 – 23.
- Jones O., ‘Loudon’s orders: Arnos Vale cemetery and the lively materialities of place’, in the Journal of Garden History, special issue on Arboretum edited by S. Daniels, C. Watkins and P. Elliot, pp 149–171.
- Jones O., ‘Rurality and the Otherness of Childhood in a British context’ in R. Panelli, S. Punch and E. Robson (eds.) Young Rural Lives: global perspectives on rural childhood and youth, London, Routledge, pp 193–204.
- Jones O., 'Idylls and Othernesses: Depictions of Rural Childhood in Film’, in R. Fish (ed.) Cinematic Countrysides, Manchester, Manchester University Press, pp 177–194.
- Jones O., 'Of Trees and Trails: place in a globalised world’, in N. Clark, D. Massey, and P. Sarre (eds.) Life in A Globalised World, Milton Keynes: Open University, pp 214–264.
- Williams, M., Jones, O., Wood, L., and Fleuriot, C., ‘Investigating New Wireless Technologies and their Potential Impact on Children’s Spatiality: A role for GIS’, Transactions in GIS, 10 (1), pp 87–102.
- Jones O., ‘Non Human Rural Studies’ in P. Cloke, T. Marsden and P. Mooney, (eds.) Handbook of Rural Studies, London: Sage, pp 185–200.
- Sarre P., Jones, O., Meegan, J., and Brook, C. Learning Companion 3: Living in a Globalised World, Milton Keynes: Open University.
- Jones O., 'An Emotional Ecology of Memory, Self and Landscape', in J. Davidson, L. Bondi and M. Smith (eds.) Emotional Geographies, Oxford, Ashgate, pp 205–218.
- Cloke, P., and Jones O., '"Unclaimed Territory": Childhood and Disordered Spaces(s)', Social and Cultural Geography, 6, 3, pp 311–323.
- Cloke, P., and Jones, O., 'Turning in the Graveyard: trees and the hybrid geographies of dwelling, monitoring and resistance in a Bristol Cemetery’, Cultural Geography, 11, 3, pp 313–341.
- Jones O., ‘Places of Trees’, Trees, Journal of the International Tree Foundation, Vol 64, pp 18–19.
- Jones O., ‘Chris Philo: Neglected Rural Geographies, 1992’ in J. McKendrick (ed.) First Steps: A Primer on the Geographies of Children, Youth and Families. London: Limited Life Working Party on Children, Youth and Families of the Royal Geographical Society with the Institute of British Geographers, p 8.
- Jones O., '"The Restraint of Beasts": rurality, animality, actor network theory and dwelling', in P. Cloke (ed.) Country Visions, London: Pearson Education. pp 450–487.
- Cloke, P. and Jones, O, 'Grounding Ethical Mindfulness For / In Nature: Trees In Their Places’, Ethics, Place and Environment, 6, 3, pp 195–213.
- Jones O., Williams, M. and Fleuriot C. ‘A New Sense of Place?’ Mobile, ‘Wearable’ ICT Devices and the Geographies of Urban Childhood’, Children’s Geographies, 1, 2, pp 165–180.
- Jones O., ‘“Endlessly Revisited and Forever Gone”: on memory and emotional imaginations in doing children’s geographies. An ‘Addendum’ to ‘“To Go Back up the Side Hill”: Memories, Imaginations and Reveries of Childhood’ by Chris Philo, Children’s Geographies, 1, 1, pp 25–36.
- Jones O., ‘Naturally Not! Childhood, the Urban and Romanticism’, Human Ecology Review, 9, 2, pp 17–30.
- Morris, W., Facer, K., C. Fleuriot., Jones, O., Reid, J., and Hull, R. ‘Mobile Bristol: A New Sense of Place’ in P. Ljungstrand and L. E. Holmquist (eds.) Ubicomp2002, Adjunct Proceedings, Gotëborg, Viktoria Inst, pp 27–29.
- Cloke, P., and Jones, O., ‘Dwelling, place, and landscape: an orchard in Somerset’, Environment and Planning A, 33, pp 649–66.
- Little J., and Jones O., ‘Masculinity, Gender and Rural Policy’, Rural Sociology, 65, 4, pp 621–639.
- Jones O., '"Before the dark of reason": some ethical and epistemological considerations on the otherness of childhood', Ethics, Place and Environment, 4, 2, pp 173–178.
- Jones O., 'Melting Geography: Purity, Disorder, Childhood and Space’, in S. Holloway and G. Valentine (eds.) Children’s Geographies: playing, living, learning London: Routledge, pp 28–47.
- Jones O., 'Inhuman Geographies: (un)Ethical Spaces of Human Non-Human Relations’, in C. Philo and C. Wilbert (eds.) Animal Spaces, Beastly Places: New Geographies of Human-Animal Relations, London: Routledge, pp 268–291.
- Jones O. and Little, J., 'Rural Challenge(s) Partnership and New Rural Governance', Journal of Rural Studies, 16, pp 171–18
