= Tommy Kennedy =

Australian rugby league footballer

Playing information
- Position: Wing
Club
Years	Team	Pld	T	G	FG	P
1923–26	Balmain	35	24	0	0	72

Tommy Kennedy was an Australian professional rugby league footballer who played in the 1920s. He played for Balmain as a winger.

== Playing career ==
Kennedy made his debut for Balmain against St. George in 1923, scoring a try in the 23–3 victory. The following year, Kennedy played on the wing in Balmain's 3-0 grand final victory over South Sydney.

Kennedy finished the season with 10 tries in 8 games. He played a further two seasons before retiring at the end of 1926.
