= Zonita Jeffreys Owens =

American educator

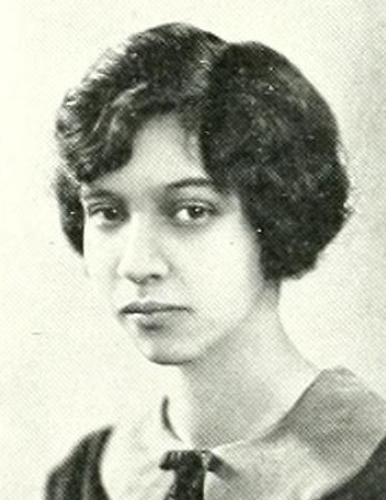
- Zonita Stewart Jeffreys, from a 1926 yearbook
- Born: Zonita Stewart Jeffreys; June 8, 1908; Chicago, Illinois
- Died: April 1981 (aged 72); Chicago, Illinois
- Occupations: Educator, Red Cross volunteer

Zonita Stewart Jeffreys Owens (June 8, 1908 – April 1981) was an American educator in Chicago and Hawai'i, and an American Red Cross volunteer. As a young woman she was active in the YWCA.

== Early life and education ==
Zonita Stewart Jeffreys was from Chicago, the daughter of Isham Jeffreys and Mary M. Jeffreys. Her father was a chiropodist born in the British West Indies. She trained as a teacher at Chicago Normal College and in 1929 earned a bachelor's degree at the University of Michigan. She was a member of Delta Sigma Theta sorority. She and her mother drove to Los Angeles in 1932, to be spectators at the Summer Olympics there. In 1936, she earned a master's degree at University of Chicago, with a thesis on the Chicago press coverage of the early labor movement.

== Career ==
Owens taught school in Chicago in the 1930s. She was active in the YWCA in Chicago, as a publicity chair and publication editor, and she represented Chicago's Black YWCAs at national conferences in 1937 and 1938.

From 1947 to 1948, Owens taught social studies at Waialua High School in Hawai'i, She also taught adult citizenship classes and gave career guidance in Oahu. She joined the Red Cross Gray Lady Service in 1949, and won awards for hundreds of hours volunteering at veterans' hospitals in Detroit and Chicago in the 1950s. In her later years, she was active in the West Woodlawn Improvement Organization, a citizens' group concerned with their Chicago neighborhood's upkeep.

== Personal life ==
Jeffreys married pediatrician Nolan A. Owens in 1935, but they rarely lived in the same city during their marriage, and they divorced in 1941. She died in 1981, in Chicago, aged 72 years. A paper she wrote about her work in Hawai'i is included in the Romanzo Adams Social Research Laboratory (RASRL) Collection at the University of Hawai'i.
