= Owain =

Owain (Welsh pronunciation: [ˈoːwain]) is a name of Welsh origin, variously written in Old Welsh as Ougein, Eugein, Euguen, Iguein, Ou(u)ein, Eug(u)ein, Yuein, and in Middle Welsh as Ewein, Owein, and Ywein. Other variants of the name Owain include Ewein, Iguein, Owein, Ouein, Ywen, Ywein, Ywain, Yuein, and Yvain. Owain has also been Latinized as Oenus.

== Etymology ==
Osborn Bergin proposed that the name is cognate with Old Irish Ugaine, Augaine, and suggested that the Irish name could be a British loan. Linguist Kenneth H. Jackson proposed that the name is a derivation of the Latin Eugenius, (which was more recently accepted by T.J. Morgan). Julius Pokorny favored a purely Celtic origin, from Brittonic *Ouo-genios/*Owi-genjos, "Born of Sheep", "Sheep kin". Linguists Holger Pedersen and Henry Lewis (who earlier linked the name to Gaulish *Esugenos) determined that both Jackson's and Pokorny's etymologies were phonologically impossible.

=== Welsh folklore ===
In Welsh folklore, the name Owain is fabled as the 'son of destiny', with examples such as the medieval Welsh historical figures born in the 14th century, Owain Lawgoch, and the Prince of Wales Owain Glyndwr.

== Popularity ==
Owain is one of the few Welsh names to be consistently popular over the last 100 years in England and Wales, particularly with the spelling Owen (and pronunciation /ˈoʊwən/). Patronymics include Bowen (from [a]b Owain) and Owens.

== People ==
=== Pre-modern era ===
Ordered chronologically.

- Owain Danwyn (fl. 440, Prince of North Wales, proposed as possible candidate for the "real" King Arthur
- Owain mab Urien (died c. 595), son of Urien, King of Rheged. He is remembered as Sir Ywain in Arthurian legend.
- Owain ap Hywel (Glywysing) (died c. 930), King of Glywysing and Gwent
- Owain ap Dyfnwal (fl. 934), King of the Cumbrians
- Owain ap Hywel Dda (died c. 988), King of Deheubarth in south Wales and probably also controlled Powys
- Owain ap Dyfnwal (died 1015), King of the Cumbrians
- Owain Foel (fl. 1018), King of the Cumbrians
- Owain Gwynedd (c. 1100–1170), aka Owain ap Gruffydd, King of Gwynedd
- Owain Fychan (c. 1125–1187), ruler of part of Powys
- Owain Cyfeiliog (c. 1130–1197), prince of part of Powys and poet
- Owain Goch ap Gruffydd (in English, "Owain the Red") (died c. 1280), ruler of part of the Kingdom of Gwynedd
- Owen de la Pole, also known as Owain ap Gruffydd ap Gwenwynwyn (c. 1257–c. 1293), lord of Powys
- Owain ap Dafydd (c. 1275–c. 1325), potential claimant to the title Prince of Gwynedd
- Owain Lawgoch (in English "Owain of the Red Hand", also known as Owain ap Thomas ap Rhodri) (c. 1330–1378), a claimant to the throne of Wales
- Owain Glyndŵr, sometimes anglicised as Owen Glendower (1359–c. 1416), last Welshman to hold the title Prince of Wales
- Owen Tudor (in Welsh, Owain ap Maredudd ap Tudur) (c. 1400–1461), Welsh courtier, the second husband of Catherine of Valois (1401–1437), widow of King Henry V of England, and grandfather of King Henry VII of England

== Modern era ==
Ordered alphabetically.

- Owain Arthur (born 1983), Welsh actor
- Owain Davies (born 1980), British musician (member of Panchiko)
- Owain Daniel Doull (born 1993), Welsh road and track cyclist
- Owain Wyn Evans (born 1984), Welsh journalist, broadcaster and television presenter
- Owain Hopkins (born 1980), Welsh cricketer
- Owain Jones (disambiguation)
- Owain Owain (1929–1993), Welsh novelist, short-story writer and poet, one of the founders of the Welsh Language Society
- Owain Park (born 1993), English composer and conductor
- Owain Williams (disambiguation)
- Owain Yeoman (born 1978), Welsh actor

== Fictional characters ==
- Owain, in the role-playing video game Fire Emblem Awakening
- Owain Hughes, minor character in Gavin & Stacey whose in-joke is a source of endless speculation.

== See also ==
- Bowen (surname)
- Owen (name) (anglicised form of the name)
