= Peter Bowne =

English physician

Peter Bowne (1575–1624?) was an English physician.

Bowne was a native of Bedfordshire and became at the age of fifteen a scholar of Corpus Christi College, Oxford, in April 1590. He was afterwards elected a fellow of that society. After taking degrees in arts, he applied himself to medicine and proceeded B.M. and D.M. at Oxford on 12 July 1614. He was admitted a candidate of the College of Physicians on 24 January 1616–17, and fellow on 21 April 1690. On 3 March 1623-4 Richard Spicer was admitted a fellow in his place.

According to Wood, Bowne practised medicine in London, "and was much in esteem for it in the latter end of King James I and beginning of Charles I." It is probable, nevertheless, that 1624 was the date of his death. He was the author of Pseudo-Medicorum Anatomia (London, 1624), in which his name appears as Bounæus. A Laurentius Bounæus, probably a son of Peter Bowne, matriculated at Leyden University on 16 November 1602, and is described in the register as "Anglus-Londinensis".
