= Max Horder =

Australian rules footballer

Personal information
- Full name: Maxwell Joseph Horder
- Born: 23 March 1923; Collingwood, Victoria
- Died: 30 April 1965 (aged 42)
- Original team: Ivanhoe Amateurs
- Height: 183 cm (6 ft 0 in)
- Weight: 90 kg (198 lb)

Playing career^{1}
Years	Club	Games (Goals)
1948	Collingwood	6 (2)
- ^{1} Playing statistics correct to the end of 1948.

Maxwell Joseph Horder (23 March 1923 – 30 April 1965) was an Australian rules footballer who played with Collingwood in the Victorian Football League (VFL).
