= Chris Horder =

Australian contemporary artist, zumbonist

- Born: 1976 (age 49–50); Sydney, New South Wales, Australia
- Education: National Art School in Darlinghurst
- Known for: Painting
- Awards: Mosman Art Prize; 2011

Christopher Horder (born 1976 in Sydney, New South Wales) is an Australian contemporary artist.

== Education ==
Horder completed a Bachelor of Fine Arts with honours at the National Art School in Darlinghurst in 2008 and in 2011 was awarded the Young Emerging Artist Award in the Mosman Art Prize. Horder is the recipient of multiple prizes and scholarships, including the Brett Whiteley Travelling Art Scholarship, as well as the prestigious Dobell Prize.

He is currently represented by leading contemporary gallery, Nanda\Hobbs, located in Chippendale, Sydney. His works have also been displayed at Liverpool Street Gallery.

A central theme to his works is "idea of the alchemy of the subconscious and the metaphysical aspects of paint itself, the work challenges the viewer’s interpretation of the visual world through the indulgences of chance imagery".
