= Bauwens =

Bauwens is a Belgian surname. Notable people with the surname include:

- Lieven Bauwens (1769−1822), Belgian entrepreneur
- Michel Bauwens (born 1958), Belgian Peer-to-Peer theorist, writer, researcher and conference speaker
- Peco Bauwens (1886−1963), German footballer
- René Bauwens (1894−1959), Belgian freestyle swimmer and water polo player
- Ward Bauwens (born 1993), Belgian swimmer

== See also ==
- Bouwens, variant spelling of the surname, more common in the Netherlands
