= Bill Horder =

Australian rugby league footballer

Personal information
- Full name: William Horder
- Born: 12 May 1929; Sydney, New South Wales, Australia
- Died: 6 November 2004 (aged 75); Sydney, New South Wales, Australia

Playing information
- Position: Prop
Club
Years	Team	Pld	T	G	FG	P
1948–53	Western Suburbs	88	10	0	0	30
1956	Eastern Suburbs	10	0	0	0	0
	Total	98	10	0	0	30
Representative
Years	Team	Pld	T	G	FG	P
1949	New South Wales	3	2	0	0	6
- Relatives: Clarrie Horder (uncle); Harold Horder (uncle)

William "Bill" Horder was an Australian professional rugby league footballer who played in the 1940s and 1950s. He played for Western Suburbs and Eastern Suburbs as a prop. He was the nephew of Harold Horder.

== Playing career ==
Horder made his debut for Western Suburbs in 1948 and was a member of the Wests team which won the premiership that year defeating Balmain 8–5 in the grand final.

In 1952, Horder was a member of the Wests team which won their fourth premiership defeating South Sydney 22–12 in the grand final. This would be the last premiership Western Suburbs would win before exiting the competition in 1999 to merge with the Balmain Tigers.

Horder played three more seasons with Wests before joining Easts in 1956 and played a single season with them before retiring. Horder also represented New South Wales on 3 occasions in 1949.
