= Clarrie Horder =

Australian rugby league footballer

Personal information
- Full name: Clarence Horder
- Born: 27 August 1890 Sydney, New South Wales, Australia
- Died: 6 June 1960 (aged 69) Sydney, New South Wales, Australia

Playing information
- Position: Centre, Wing
Club
Years	Team	Pld	T	G	FG	P
1913–21	South Sydney	80	41	14	0	151
Representative
Years	Team	Pld	T	G	FG	P
1919	New South Wales	2	3	4	0	17
1922	Queensland	1	0	0	0	0
- Relatives: Harold Horder (brother); Bill Horder (nephew)

Clarence 'Clarrie' Horder (1890–1960) was an Australian pioneer rugby league footballer who played in the 1910s and 1920s.

== Background ==
Horder was born in Sydney, New South Wales, Australia, to parents Charles and Ellen Horder on 27 August 1890.

== Playing career ==
The older brother of South Sydney and North Sydney legend Harold Horder, Horder was also a handy rugby league player for South Sydney, playing eight seasons with them between 1913 and 1921. Known by the nickname of 'Spot', Horder also played representative rugby league for New South Wales in 1919 and for Queensland in 1922.

Horder scored 41 tries and 14 goals (total 151 points) for South Sydney during his career. In 1922 he became captain-coach of an Ipswich team before retiring from the game and returning to Sydney.

== Death ==
Horder died on 6 June 1960 at St. George Hospital, aged 69. He was cremated at Woronora Crematorium, Sutherland.
