= Les Hayes (rugby league) =

Australian rugby league footballer

Personal information
- Full name: Leslie Alfred Hayes
- Born: 24 October 1902
- Died: 28 September 2000 (aged 97)

Playing information
- Position: Prop, Second-row
Club
Years	Team	Pld	T	G	FG	P
1923–26	Balmain	45	7	0	0	21
1927–28	Western Suburbs	19	9	0	0	27
	Total	64	16	0	0	48
Representative
Years	Team	Pld	T	G	FG	P
1924–25	New South Wales	11	0	0	0	0

Leslie Alfred Hayes (24 October 1902 – 28 September 2000), known by the nickname "Buller", was an Australian professional rugby league footballer who played in the 1920s. He played for Balmain and Western Suburbs as a prop or second rower.

== Playing career ==
Hayes made his debut in 1923 for Balmain against Western Suburbs at Pratten Park. The following year, Hayes was a member of the Balmain side which won the 1924 premiership defeating South Sydney 3–0 in the grand final. Hayes played with Balmain for another two seasons before joining Western Suburbs in 1927.

Hayes spent two years at Wests and retired at the end of the 1928 season. Hayes also played 11 times for New South Wales.
