= Charlie Collier (rugby league) =

Australian rugby league footballer (1887-1962)

Personal information
- Full name: Charles Sampson Collier
- Born: 17 September 1887 Woollahra, New South Wales, Australia
- Died: 2 December 1962 (aged 75)

Playing information
- Position: Wing
Club
Years	Team	Pld	T	G	FG	P
1911–12	South Sydney	19	12	0	0	36
1914	Western Suburbs	11	0	1	0	2
	Total	30	12	1	0	38
Representative
Years	Team	Pld	T	G	FG	P
1911	Metropolis	1	0	0	0	0
- Source: As of 2 December 2022

Charles Sampson Collier (1887-1962) was an Australian former professional rugby league footballer who played in the 1910s. He played for the South Sydney and Western Suburbs in the New South Wales Rugby League (NSWRL) competition.

== Playing career ==
Collier made his first grade debut for South Sydney in round 5 of the 1911 NSWRL season against Western Suburbs which ended in a 13-8 victory at the Metters Sports Ground. In the same season, Collier was selected to play for Metropolis. In 1912, Collier played in South Sydney's 30-5 City Cup final victory over Glebe scoring a try. In 1914, Collier joined Western Suburbs making eleven appearances.
