= Owen Walter =

- Born: August 15, 1979 (age 46) Prince Albert, Saskatchewan, Canada
- Height: 6 ft 0 in (183 cm)
- Weight: 190 lb (86 kg; 13 st 8 lb)
- Position: Defence
- Shot: Left
- Played for: Rockford IceHogs (UHL); Basingstoke Bison (EIHL)
- NHL draft: Undrafted
- Playing career: 2003–2005

Owen Walter was born in August 15, 1979. He was born in Prince Albert, Saskatchwewan, Canada. He is a Canadian former professional ice hockey defenceman.

== Education and career ==
Walter attended Brown University, where he played four seasons (1999-2003) of NCAA college hockey with the Brown Bears, scoring 3 goals and 9 assists for 12 points while earning 76 penalty minutes in 81 games played. In his senior year, he was presented with the 2003 Charles A. Robinson Memorial Trophy, an annual award given to the Brown University hockey letterman attaining the highest academic average for his first seven semesters.

Walter went on to play professional hockey in the United Hockey League, where he played in 75 games with the 2003-04 Rockford IceHogs, and in the British Elite Ice Hockey League playing 48 games with the 2004-05 Basingstoke Bison.
