= Bownes =

Bownes is a surname. Notable people with the surname include:

- Fabien Bownes (born 1972), American football player
- Hugh H. Bownes (1920–2003), American federal judge
- Mary Bownes (born 1948), British molecular and developmental biologist
- Shaun Bownes (born 1970), South African athlete

== See also ==
- Bowne (surname)
- Bown (surname)
- Bowen (surname)
- Bowens (surname)
