= Eddie Hilliard =

Australian rugby league footballer

Personal information
- Full name: Edward Hilliard

Playing information
- Position: Second-row, Lock, Hooker
Club
Years	Team	Pld	T	G	FG	P
1911–17	South Sydney	83	5	1	0	17
1918	Newtown	16	0	0	0	0
	Total	99	5	1	0	17
Representative
Years	Team	Pld	T	G	FG	P
1912–15	Metropolis	3	0	0	0	0
1913	New South Wales	5	1	0	0	3
- Source: As of 5 December 2022

Eddie Hilliard was an Australian former professional rugby league footballer who played in the 1910s. He played for the South Sydney and Newtown in the New South Wales Rugby League (NSWRL) competition.

== Playing career ==
Hilliard made his first grade debut for South Sydney in round 1 of the 1911 NSWRL season against North Sydney at the Sydney Sports Ground. In 1914, Hilliard played 13 games as South Sydney claimed the premiership due to the first past the post rule. In 1918, Hilliard joined Newtown and played 16 games including the clubs City Cup final loss to Western Suburbs. Hilliard's nickname during his playing career was "Dutchy".

== Representative career ==
Hilliard represented Metropolis on three occasions between 1912-1915 and played five games for New South Wales in 1913.
