= Bowne =

Bowne is a surname. Notable people with the surname include:

- Alan Bowne (1945–1989), American playwright and author
- Andrew Bowne (c. 1638–c. 1708), American colonial politician
- Borden Parker Bowne (1847–1910), theologian associated with American Methodism
- John Bowne (1627–1695), English colonist in North America
- Norwood Bowne (1813–1890), New York newspaper editor and politician
- Obadiah Bowne (1822–1874), American politician from New York
- Peter Bowne (1575–c. 1624), English physician
- Samuel S. Bowne (1800–1865), American politician from New York
- Walter Bowne (1770–1846), 59th Mayor of New York City

== See also ==
- Bown (surname)
- Bownes
- Bowen (surname)
- Bowens (surname)
