= Owen McCarthy =

Australian rugby league footballer and coach

Personal information
- Full name: Eugene Sylvester McCarthy
- Born: 26 November 1882 Eden, New South Wales
- Died: 28 March 1940 (aged 57) Redfern, New South Wales

Playing information
- Position: Hooker, Second-row, Lock
Club
Years	Team	Pld	T	G	FG	P
1911	Balmain	13	0	0	0	0
1912–17	South Sydney	65	0	0	0	0
	Total	78	0	0	0	0

Coaching information
Club
Years	Team	Gms	W	D	L	W%
1924	South Sydney	10	6	1	3	60
- Source: As of 1 May 2019

Eugene Sylvester 'Owen' McCarthy (1882–1940) was an Australian professional rugby league footballer who played in the 1910s. He played for South Sydney and Balmain in the New South Wales Rugby League (NSWRL) competition. He later became the coach of the club in the mid-1920s.

== Background ==
McCarthy was born in Eden, New South Wales and played rugby union for Surry Hills and South Sydney in his early years. McCarthy also played for Alexandria in the South Sydney district rugby league competition.

== Playing career ==
Despite being a Souths junior, McCarthy made his first grade debut for Balmain in Round 1 1911 against Newtown at the Sydney Sports Ground. Balmain would go on to finish last in 1911, one of only 4 times the club would finish last in its entire history.

In 1912, McCarthy joined South Sydney. In 1914, McCarthy played 13 games as Souths won the premiership losing only 2 games all year.

In 1916, South Sydney reached the grand final against Balmain. The final was required to be played due to both clubs finishing on equal points. Balmain went into the halftime break with a 5–0 lead. In the second half, Souths crossed over for a try to make the score 5–3. Despite repeated attacks at the Balmain line, Souths were unable to score another try and lost the grand final which was played in front of a low crowd of 7,000 at the Sydney Cricket Ground. McCarthy retired at the end of the 1917 season as a player. McCarthy amazingly went his whole first grade career without scoring a try. In total, McCarthy played 82 games for Souths across all grades.

== Coaching career ==
In 1924, McCarthy became the head coach at South Sydney. He guided Souths to the 1924 NSWRL grand final which was against Balmain. Souths lost the match 3–0 at the Sydney Cricket Ground in the lowest scoring grand final in the game's history. Following the grand final defeat, McCarthy stepped down as coach and was replaced by club legend Howard Hallett.
