= Arthur McCabe =

Australia international rugby union & league player (1887–1924)

- Born: Arthur John Michael McCabe; 23 June 1887 Tamworth, New South Wales
- Died: 30 July 1924 (aged 37) Redfern, New South Wales

Rugby union career
- Position: fly-half
International career
Years	Team	Apps	(Points)
1909	Australia	1	(0)
- Rugby league career

Playing information
Club
Years	Team	Pld	T	G	FG	P
1910	Rabbitohs	65				144
Representative
Years	Team	Pld	T	G	FG	P
1910	NSW	2				12
Medal record
Men's rugby union
Representing Australasia
Olympic Games
Gold medal – first place	1908 London	Team competition

Arthur John Michael "Mackker" McCabe (23 June 1887 – 30 July 1924) was an Australian rugby union and pioneer professional rugby league footballer. He represented for Australian in rugby union at the 1908 Summer Olympics.

== Rugby union career ==
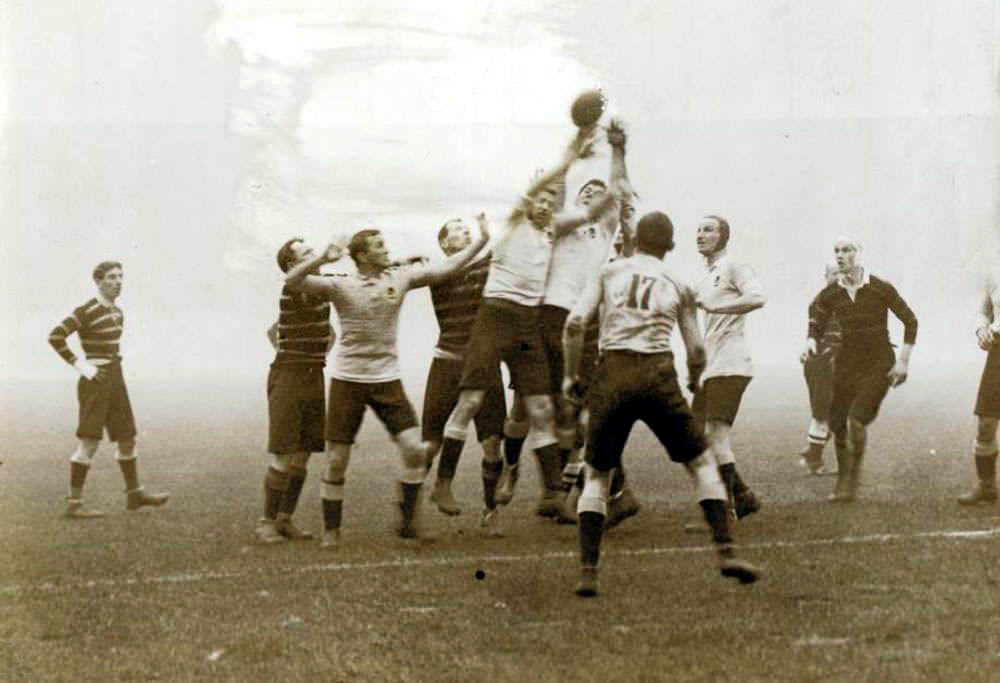
1908 Olympic Gold Final Wallabies v Cornwall.

A brilliant fly-half, Mackker McCabe was a member of the Australian rugby union team, which won the gold medal, with McCabe scoring two tries in the gold medal victory.

While he toured the US and England with the Wallabies in the lead-up tour prior to the Olympics, his gold medal match was his sole Australian representative appearance.

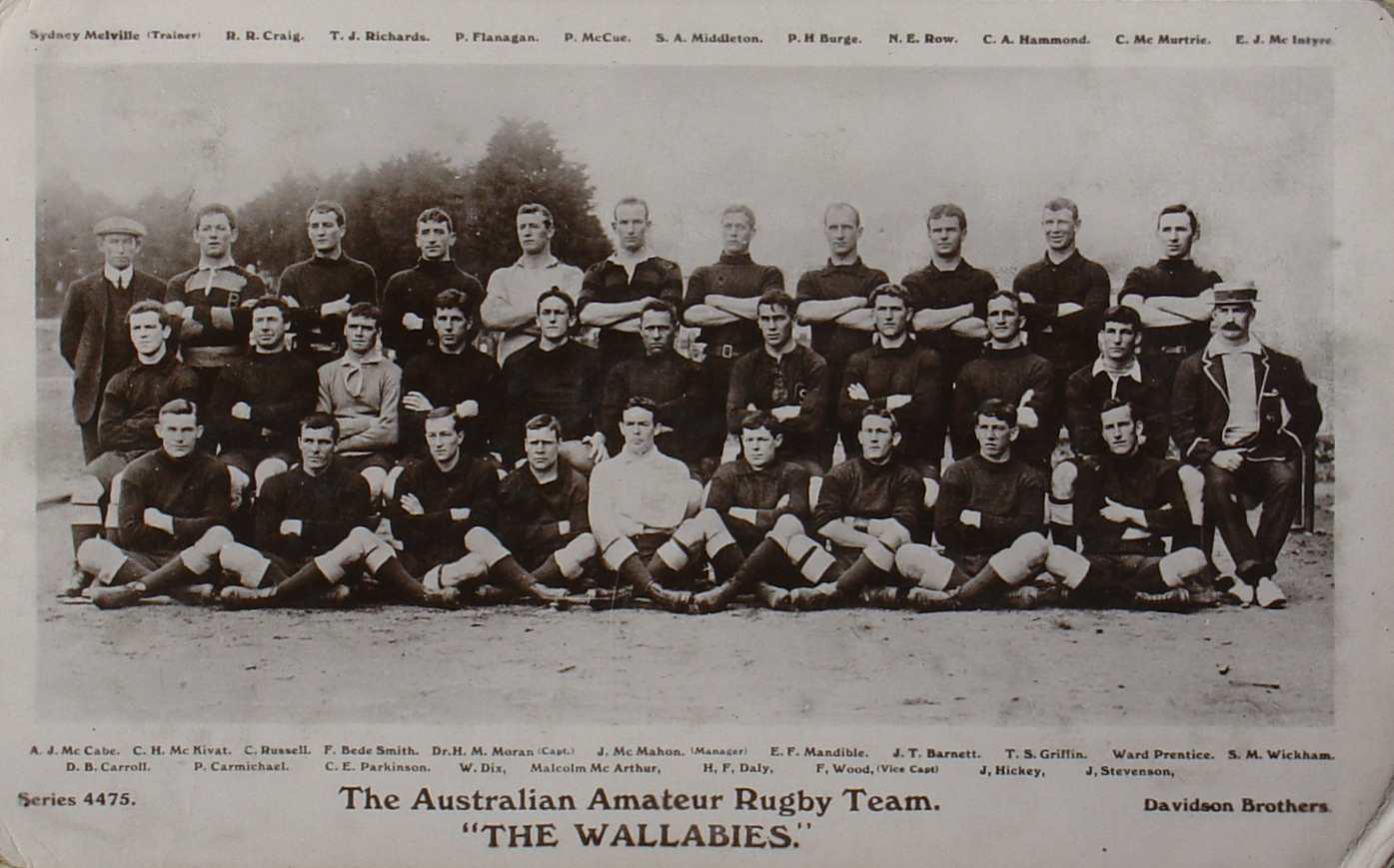
Middle row far left, with the 1908 Wallaby tour squad

== Rugby league career ==
On his return to Australia, he joined the fledgling code of rugby league along with 13 of his Olympic teammates. He played for five seasons with the South Sydney Rabbitohs, finishing his career with a premiership win in 1914. Despite representing for New South Wales in rugby league in 1910 he was unsuccessful in his bid to become a dual-code rugby international.

For the season 1910, he was the NSW Rugby Football League's top try scorer. He was so highly praised by the press that they dubbed him The Will-O'-The-Wisp, a phrase that became synonymous with McCabe.

== Death ==
Arthur McCabe died suddenly of a heart attack at his home in Morehead Street, Redfern on 30 July 1924, age 37. A large funeral was held for 'Mackker' McCabe and was attended by many ex Wallaby players and South Sydney players. He was buried at Rookwood Cemetery on 31 July 1924.

== See also ==
- Rugby union at the 1908 Summer Olympics
