= Bown =

Bown is a surname. Notable people with the surname include:

- Andy Bown (born 1946), English musician
- Archie Bown (1882–1958), English football (soccer) striker
- Arthur Bown (1851–1916), English architect
- Chuck Bown (born 1954), American racing driver
- Dick Bown (1928–2014), American racing driver
- Heather Bown (born 1978), American volleyball player
- Henry Edwin Bown (1845–1881), English architect
- Jane Bown (1925–2014), British photographer
- Jim Bown (born 1960), American racing driver
- John Young Bown (1821–1890), Canadian physician
- Paul Bown (born 1957), British actor
- Ralph Bown (1891–1971), American radio pioneer
- Stuart Bown (born 1978), Australian rules footballer

== See also ==
- Bowne (surname)
- Bowen (surname)
- Bowens (surname)
