= Harold Horder =

Australia international rugby league footballer (1894–1978)

Personal information
- Full name: Harold Norman Horder
- Born: 24 February 1894 Surry Hills, New South Wales, Australia
- Died: 21 August 1978 (aged 84)

Playing information
- Height: 168 cm (5 ft 6 in)
- Weight: 67 kg (10 st 8 lb)
- Position: Wing
Club
Years	Team	Pld	T	G	FG	P
1912–19	South Sydney	77	95	68	1	423
1920–23	North Sydney	50	50	73	0	296
1924	South Sydney	12	7	9	0	39
1925–26	Coorparoo					3
	Total	139	152	150	1	761
Representative
Years	Team	Pld	T	G	FG	P
1914–24	Australia	13	11	10	0	53
1913–24	New South Wales	31	62	38	0	262
1925	Queensland	1	1	0	0	3
1914–23	Metropolis	6	10	15	0	60
- Source: As of 4 August 2020
- Relatives: Clarrie Horder (brother); Bill Horder (nephew)

Harold Norman Horder (23 February 1894 – 21 August 1978) was an Australian rugby league footballer. He was a national and state representative player whose club career was with South Sydney and North Sydney between 1912 and 1924. Regarded as one of the greatest wingers to play the game, from 1924 until 1969 his 152 career tries was the NSWRFL record.

== Playing career ==
Born in Surry Hills, New South Wales, Horder played 86 games for Souths between 1912–1919 and 1924, 31 games for New South Wales, 13 Test matches for Australia.

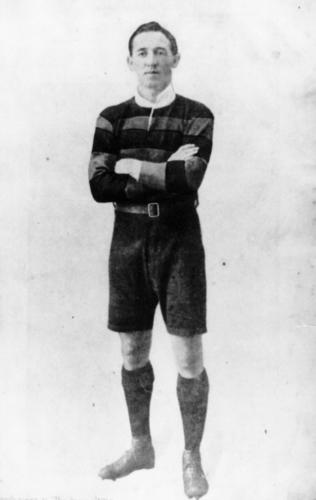

After following his brother Clarence "Spot" Horder to South Sydney, Harold, in his first game, stepped and swerved through the entire Glebe team in a 90-metre dash to score one of the greatest individual tries in rugby league history. He went on to be the NSW Rugby Football League's top try scorer in 1913, 1914 and 1917 and for each of the four seasons 1913, 1914, 1918 and 1922 he was the League's top point scorer.

The Gregory's reference records that, in the 1912 City Cup-tie against Glebe, Harold induced the Souths selectors to name his relatively inexperienced brother Clarrie in the side. While Glebe was concentrating on Harold, Clarrie cut holes in the defence and Souths won 30–5.

Horder was selected to make his debut for Australia during the 1914 Great Britain Lions tour of Australia and New Zealand. He was selected to go on the 1921–22 Kangaroo tour of Great Britain. He scored 102 tries for South Sydney and 50 tries for North Sydney. Horder scored 20 individual points in Norths' 1922 grand final win which consisted of 2 tries and 7 goals. In his final season at Souths he became the first player to score 150 tries in NSWRFL history. His final game in the NSWRFL competition was the 1924 grand final loss against Balmain which finished 3–0, the lowest scoring grand final Australian rugby league history. In total, Horder won 4 premierships, 2 with Souths in 1914 and 1918. Horder then won 2 premierships with Norths in 1921 and 1922.

In 1918 he overtook Dally Messenger's record for the most points scored in an NSWRFL career (379); Horder's eventual total of 758 stood as the new career record for nine seasons until it was bettered by Arthur Oxford in 1927.

In 1925, Harold moved to the Brisbane rugby league club Coorparoo as their captain coach for two seasons after leaving Souths.

He appeared in an Australian film In the Last Stride (1916).

== Accolades ==
The New South Wales Rugby League's Rugby League Annual of 1928 commented "if he is not the greatest of all rugby league footballers, he is unquestionably the greatest of all wing three-quarters".

Horder was inducted into the Australian Rugby League Hall of Fame on 7 September 2004 at the Dally M Awards in Sydney.

In 2004 Horder was named by Souths in its South Sydney Dream Team, consisting of 17 players and a coach representing the club from 1908 through to 2004. In August, 2006 he was also named as a winger in the North Sydney Bears' Team of the Century.

In February 2008, Horder was named in the list of Australia's 100 Greatest Players (1908–2007), that which was commissioned by the NRL and ARL to celebrate the code's centenary year in Australia.

== Footnotes ==
Preceded by Dally Messenger (1911)	Record-holder; Most points in an NSWRFL career 1918 (380) – 1927 (758)	Succeeded by Arthur Oxford (1927)
