= List of NSWRL/ARL/SL/NRL seasons =

This is a list of seasons of the National Rugby League, including its predecessors in the New South Wales Rugby League, Australian Rugby League and Super League.

Seasons
1900s										1908	1909
1910s		1910	1911	1912	1913	1914	1915	1916	1917	1918	1919
1920s		1920	1921	1922	1923	1924	1925	1926	1927	1928	1929
1930s		1930	1931	1932	1933	1934	1935	1936	1937	1938	1939
1940s		1940	1941	1942	1943	1944	1945	1946	1947	1948	1949
1950s		1950	1951	1952	1953	1954	1955	1956	1957	1958	1959
1960s		1960	1961	1962	1963	1964	1965	1966	1967	1968	1969
1970s		1970	1971	1972	1973	1974	1975	1976	1977	1978	1979
1980s		1980	1981	1982	1983	1984	1985	1986	1987	1988	1989
1990s	NSWRL	1990	1991	1992	1993	1994					
1990s	ARL						1995	1996	1997		
1990s	SL								1997		
1990s	NRL									1998	1999
2000s		2000	2001	2002	2003	2004	2005	2006	2007	2008	2009
2010s		2010	2011	2012	2013	2014	2015	2016	2017	2018	2019
2020s		2020	2021	2022	2023	2024	2025	2026	2027	2028	2029

== See also ==
- Australian rugby league premiers
- Super League war
