= William Geoghegan =

Australian rugby league footballer

Playing information
- Position: Centre, Wing, Prop, Lock
Club
Years	Team	Pld	T	G	FG	P
1911	Annandale	2	0	0	0	0
1912	Balmain	11	1	0	0	3
1914–19	Annandale	44	9	1	0	29
	Total	57	10	1	0	32

William Geoghegan was an Australian professional rugby league footballer who played for Annandale of the New South Wales Rugby League Premiership.

== Playing career ==
Geoghegan made his debut with Annandale in Round 5 of the 1911 season in a 2–2 draw against North Sydney. He made an appearance in the following round and did not play for the rest of the season. In 1912, he signed with Balmain and made his debut for the club in the opening round of the season. He scored the first try of his career in a round 13 loss to Newtown.

Geoghegan returned with Annandale in the 1914 season, after sitting out 1913. He scored a try in his first game back in round 9 against Newtown. Two rounds later, he scored a try, though his club lost 9–29 to Glebe. In round 13, Geoghegan scored a try in Annandale's only win of the season against Eastern Suburbs.

In 1915, Geoghegan was moved to the wing. He made played three games in the first 5 rounds of the season and did not make an appearance until round 14 - where he would score a try in a 16–12 win against Western Suburbs.

Geoghegan made 4 appearances in 1916, not scoring any tries.

1917 was a transition year for Annadale as prolific goal-kicker William Doyle retired and Geoghegan was transitioned from the three-quarters to the forwards. He played 8 games for the season.

Geoghegan played in the forwards and centres interchangeably in 1918. In round 12, he scored a try and the first and only goal of his career in a loss to Balmain. Two rounds later he scored a try against Wests. Annandale finished the season with the wooden spoon, not recording any wins in the 1918 season.

The 1919 season was Geoghegan's last. He scored a try in round 9 against South Sydney and round 13 against Norths. He scored a try in the final game of his career against Western Suburbs in Round 14.

He finished his career with 10 tries and 1 goal (32 points) in 57 appearances.
