= Roy Almond =

Australian rugby league footballer

Personal information
- Full name: Harry Roy Almond
- Born: 3 January 1891 Glebe, New South Wales, Australia
- Died: 14 August 1960 (aged 69) Newcastle, New South Wales, Australia

Playing information
- Position: Hooker
Club
Years	Team	Pld	T	G	FG	P
1912–17	South Sydney	38	4	0	0	12

Harry Roy Almond (1891–1960) was an Australian rugby league footballer who played in the 1910s.

== Playing career ==
Almond was born at Glebe, New South Wales. He played five seasons at South Sydney Rabbitohs between 1912–1917.

Almond made his debut with Souths in round 13 of the 1912 season against Annandale at second-row. He would not make another appearance for the season and would not appear until round 3 of the 1914 season - where he would score a try to help his team win 17–9 against Western Suburbs. Almond played 7 more games that season and Souths would finish with the 1914 minor premiership, and consequently, the premiership.

In round 12 of 1915, Almond scored a try in a 29–3 win over North Sydney. He scored a try in the opening round of 1916, before scoring the final try of his career in a 12-point win over Norths. Souths made the grand final in 1916, however Almond did not play.

Almond played 4 more seasons in 1917, before retiring after his final game against Annandale in Round 9.

Almond died in 1960 at Newcastle, New South Wales.
