= Bill Lucas (rugby league) =

Australian rugby league footballer (1891-1961)

Personal information
- Full name: John William Lucas
- Born: 23 March 1891 Granville, New South Wales, Australia
- Died: 7 May 1961 (aged 70)

Playing information
- Position: Hooker, Prop
Club
Years	Team	Pld	T	G	FG	P
1917–18	Annandale	15	2	0	0	6
1919	Western Suburbs	2	0	0	0	0
1920	Annandale	13	0	0	0	0
1921–22	Balmain	24	3	0	0	9
1923–25	Glebe	29	0	0	0	0
	Total	83	5	0	0	15
- Source: As of 21 April 2023

John William Lucas nicknamed "Wakka" was an Australian former professional rugby league footballer who played in the 1910s and 1920s. He played for Annandale, Western Suburbs, Balmain and Glebe in the NSWRL competition.

== Playing career ==
Lucas made his first grade debut for Annandale in round 9 of the 1917 NSWRFL season against South Sydney at Wentworth Park scoring a try in a 19–11 loss. In 1918, he played 14 games as the club finished with the Wooden Spoon. In 1919, Lucas joined Western Suburbs but only played two games before returning to Annandale. Lucas played in Annandale's final season in 1920 as the club went winless and finished with another wooden spoon. Lucas played in their final game in the competition against Eastern Suburbs which ended in a 15–0 loss. The game was played at the Sydney Cricket Ground No. 2 Oval. In 1921, Lucas joined defending premiers Balmain and stayed with the club for two years. In 1923, Lucas signed on to play with Glebe who had finished as runners up the year before to North Sydney. On the 22 September 1923, Lucas played in Glebe's City Cup loss to Balmain. Lucas retired at the end of the 1925 season.
