= John Larkin (rugby league) =

Australian rugby league footballer

Personal information
- Full name: John Larkin

Playing information
- Position: Centre, Wing
Club
Years	Team	Pld	T	G	FG	P
1915	Annandale	9	6	0	0	18
1916	Newtown	6	3	0	0	9
1919	Eastern Suburbs	1	1	0	0	3
	Total	16	10	0	0	30
- Source: As of 19 April 2023

John Larkin was an Australian former professional rugby league footballer who played in the 1910s. He played for Eastern Suburbs, Annandale and Newtown in the NSWRL competition.

== Playing career ==
Larkin made his first grade debut in round 6 of the 1915 NSWRFL season against Newtown at Erskineville Oval. Larkin finished as Annandale's top try scorer that year with six tries in nine games. In 1916, Larkin joined Newtown and played six games. In 1919, he played one match for Eastern Suburbs and scored one try.
