= Henry Pidcock =

Australian rugby league footballer

Personal information
- Full name: Henry Pidcock

Playing information
- Position: Centre, Wing
Club
| Years | Team | Pld | T | G | FG | P |
|---|---|---|---|---|---|---|
| 1915–19 | Annandale | 28 | 5 | 0 | 0 | 15 |
| 1920 | North Sydney | 8 | 1 | 0 | 0 | 3 |
| 1921–22 | Balmain | 15 | 3 | 0 | 0 | 9 |
| 1923–24 | Glebe | 2 | 0 | 0 | 0 | 0 |
| | Total | 53 | 9 | 0 | 0 | 27 |
- Source: As of 21 April 2023

Henry Pidcock was an Australian former professional rugby league footballer who played in the 1910s and 1920s. He played for Annandale, North Sydney, Balmain and Glebe in the NSWRL competition.

== Playing career ==
Pidcock made his first grade debut for Annandale in round 9 of the 1915 NSWRFL season against Glebe at Wentworth Park. Pidcock scored a try during the game which saw The Dales lose 28–5 against their rivals. Pidcock finished his debut season with five tries in six games, making him the clubs second highest try scorer that year. After a further four years at Annandale, Pidcock signed for North Sydney in 1920 where he played eight games. In 1921, he joined defending premiers Balmain where he played for two years before finishing his career at Glebe.
