= Walter Palmer (rugby league) =

Australian rugby league footballer

Personal information
- Full name: William Palmer
- Born: 10 February 1892 Leichhardt, New South Wales, Australia
- Died: 12 June 1973 (aged 81)

Playing information
- Position: Hooker
Club
Years	Team	Pld	T	G	FG	P
1910	Western Suburbs	8	0	0	0	0
1913–17	Annandale	54	2	11	0	28
1918	Western Suburbs	14	0	0	0	0
1919–20	Newtown	14	0	0	0	0
	Total	90	2	11	0	28
Representative
Years	Team	Pld	T	G	FG	P
1915	New South Wales	2	0	0	0	0
1914–15	Metropolis	3	0	0	0	0
- Source: As of 16 October 2025

William Palmer, nickname 'Bongi' (10 February 1892 – 12 June 1973), was an Australian former professional rugby league footballer who played in the 1910s and 1920s. He played for Western Suburbs, Annandale and Newtown in the NSWRL competition.

== Playing career ==
Palmer made his first grade debut for Western Suburbs in round 1 of the 1910 NSWRFL season against Eastern Suburbs at the Royal Agricultural Society Showground. Palmer played eight matches for the club as they finished with the Wooden Spoon. In 1913, Palmer joined Annandale where he played 54 games over five seasons. Palmer's time at Annandale was not successful with the club finishing with the wooden spoon or second bottom of the table in all but one of his years there. In 1918, he returned to Western Suburbs and played 14 games as they finished runners up to South Sydney. In 1919, Palmer joined Newtown where he played 14 games over two years. Palmer represented New South Wales twice in 1915 and played three games for Metropolis.
