= 1918 NSWRFL season =

Rugby league competition

1918 New South Wales Rugby Football League
- Teams: 8
- Premiers: South Sydney (4th title)
- Minor premiers: South Sydney (4th title)
- Matches played: 56
- Points scored: 1345
- Top points scorer: Harold Horder (87)
- Wooden spoon: Annandale (2nd spoon)
- Top try-scorer: Frank Burge (24)

The 1918 New South Wales Rugby Football League premiership was the eleventh season of Sydney’s professional rugby league club competition, Australia’s first. Eight teams from across the city contested during the season, with South Sydney finishing on top of the ladder to claim the premiership.

== Season summary ==
The quality of the competition in 1918 suffered due to the loss of players fighting in World War I. South Sydney and Western Suburbs dominated the season, dropping just two and three games respectively. With just three rounds to go, both sides met each square on 18 points each. A win for South Sydney would virtually guarantee them the premiership unless they dropped their final two games. At the end of the day, South Sydney prevailed 11–3 and went on to win all their remaining matches, taking away their fourth premiership from eleven seasons.

The season also saw the struggling Dales fail to win a game from fourteen starts. It was the first winless season in NSWRFL history and signalled the end for the club, who would play only a further two seasons in the premiership.

The Western Suburbs club claimed their first title by winning the knockout competition, the City Cup.

=== Teams ===
The lineup of teams remained unchanged from the previous season.

- Annandale
- Balmain, formed on 23 January 1908 at Balmain Town Hall
- Eastern Suburbs, formed on 24 January 1908 at Paddington Town Hall
- Glebe, formed on 9 January 1908
- Newtown, formed on 14 January 1908
- North Sydney, formed on 7 February 1908
- South Sydney, formed on 17 January 1908 at Redfern Town Hall
- Western Suburbs, formed on 4 February 1908

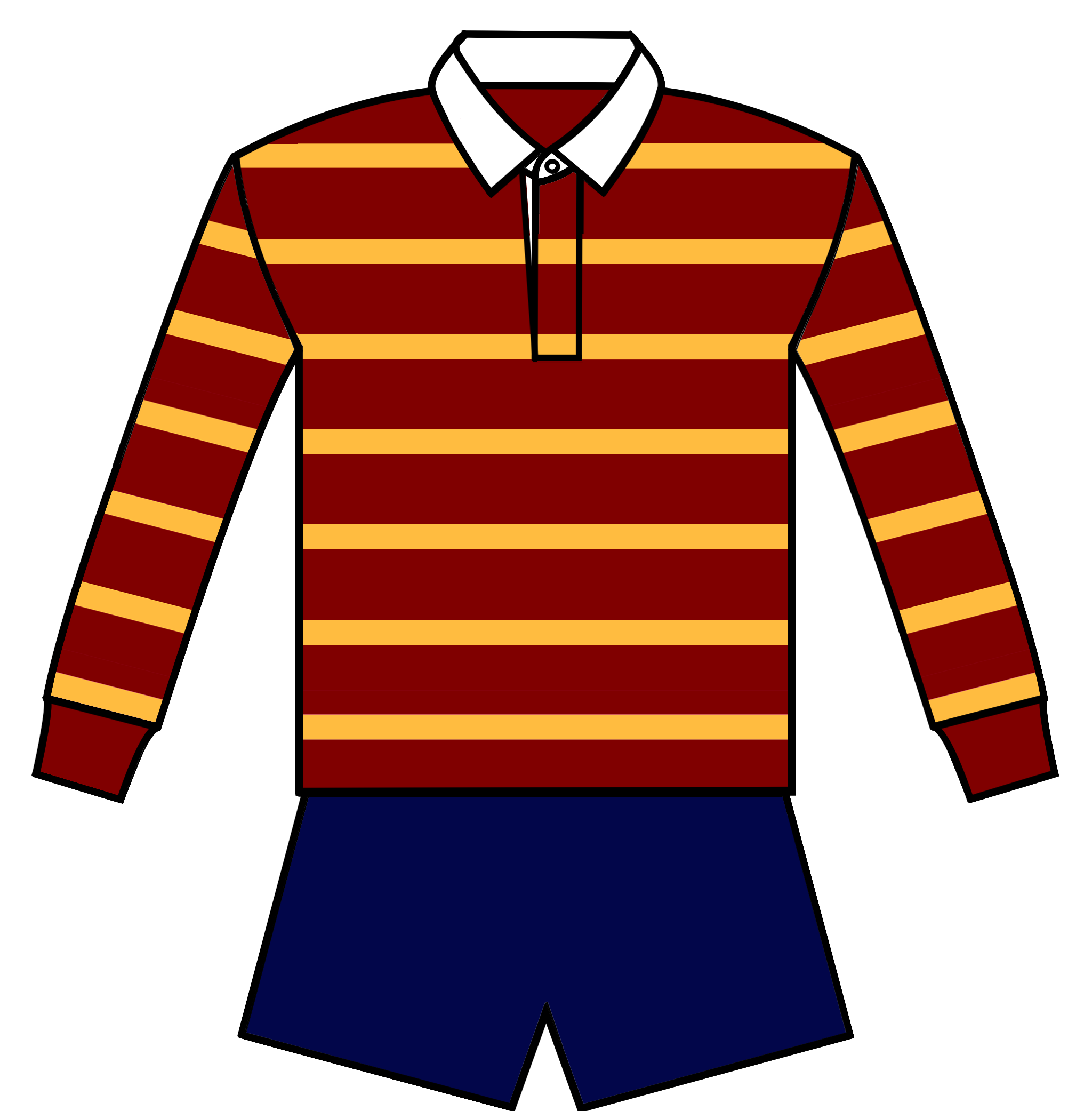
Annandale; 9th season Ground:Wentworth Park; Coach: Captain: Arthur Butler

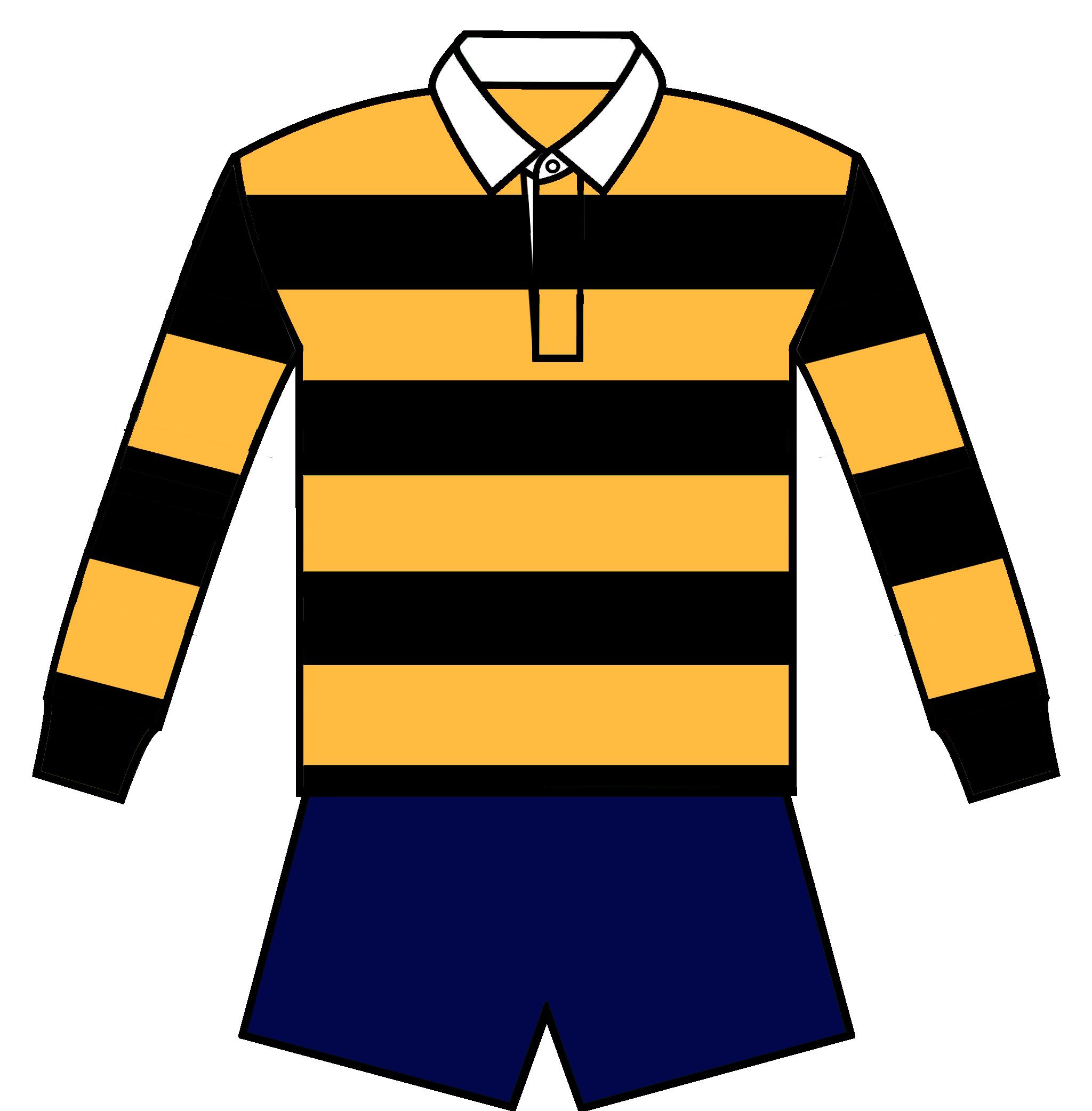
Balmain; 11th season Ground: Birchgrove Oval; Captain-Coach: Arthur Halloway

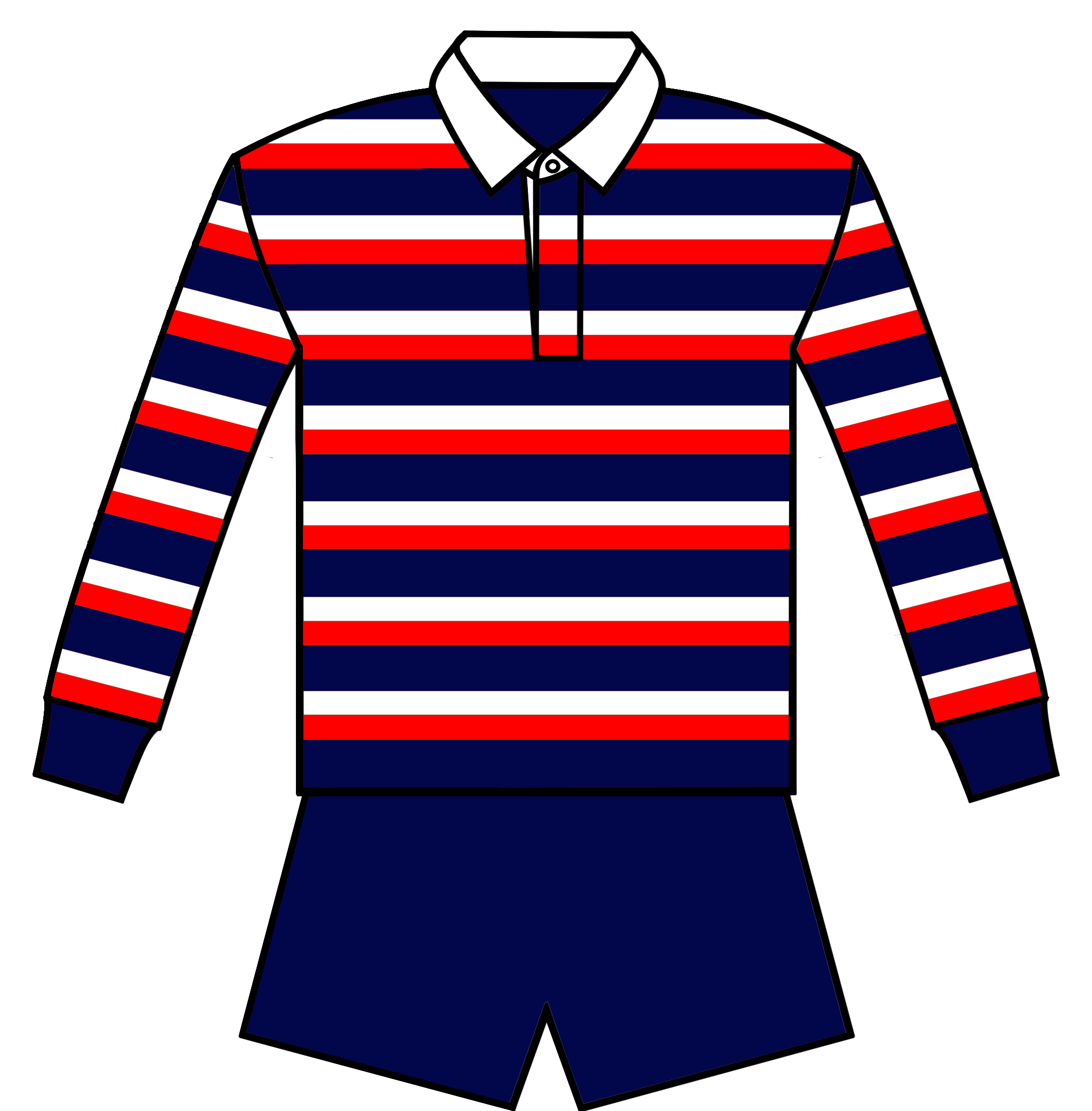
Eastern Suburbs; 11th season Ground: Sydney Sports Ground; Coach: Sandy Pearce; Captain: Sandy Pearce

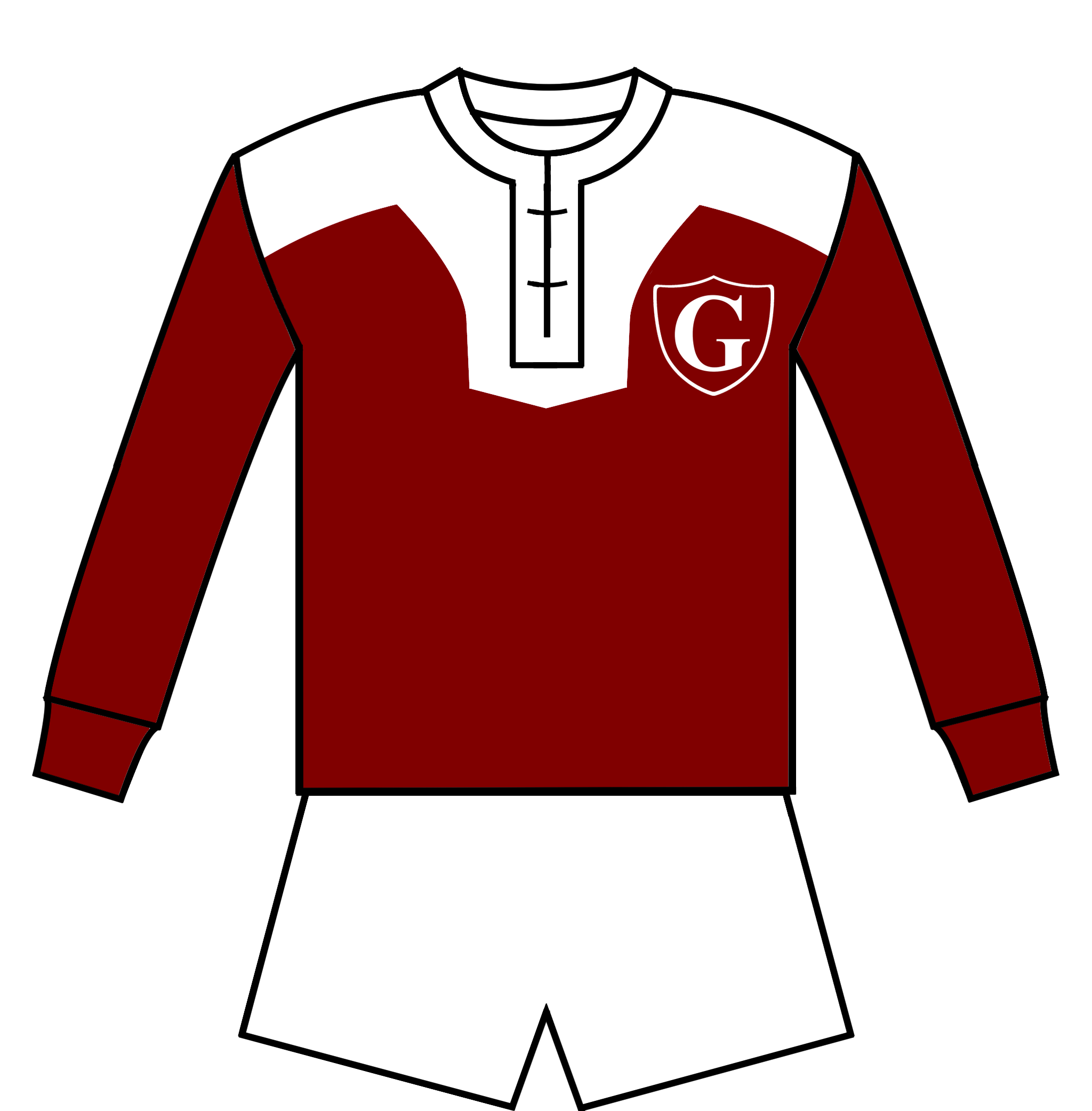
Glebe; 11th season Ground: Wentworth Park; Coach: Chris McKivat; Captain: Albert Burge

Newtown; 11th season Ground: Erskineville Oval; Coach: Captain: George Bain

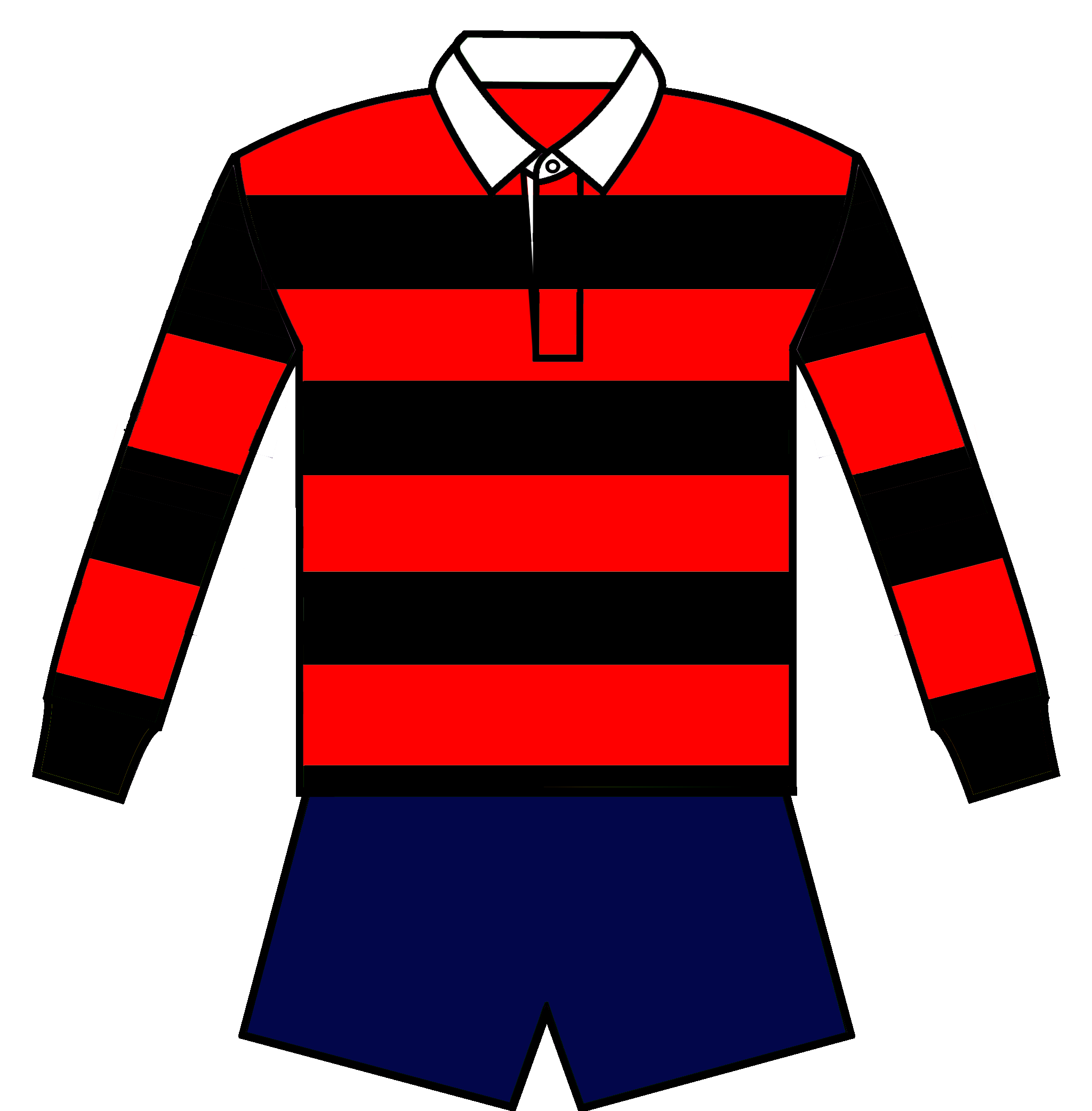
North Sydney; 11th season Ground: North Sydney Oval; Coach: George Green; Captain: Cec Blinkhorn

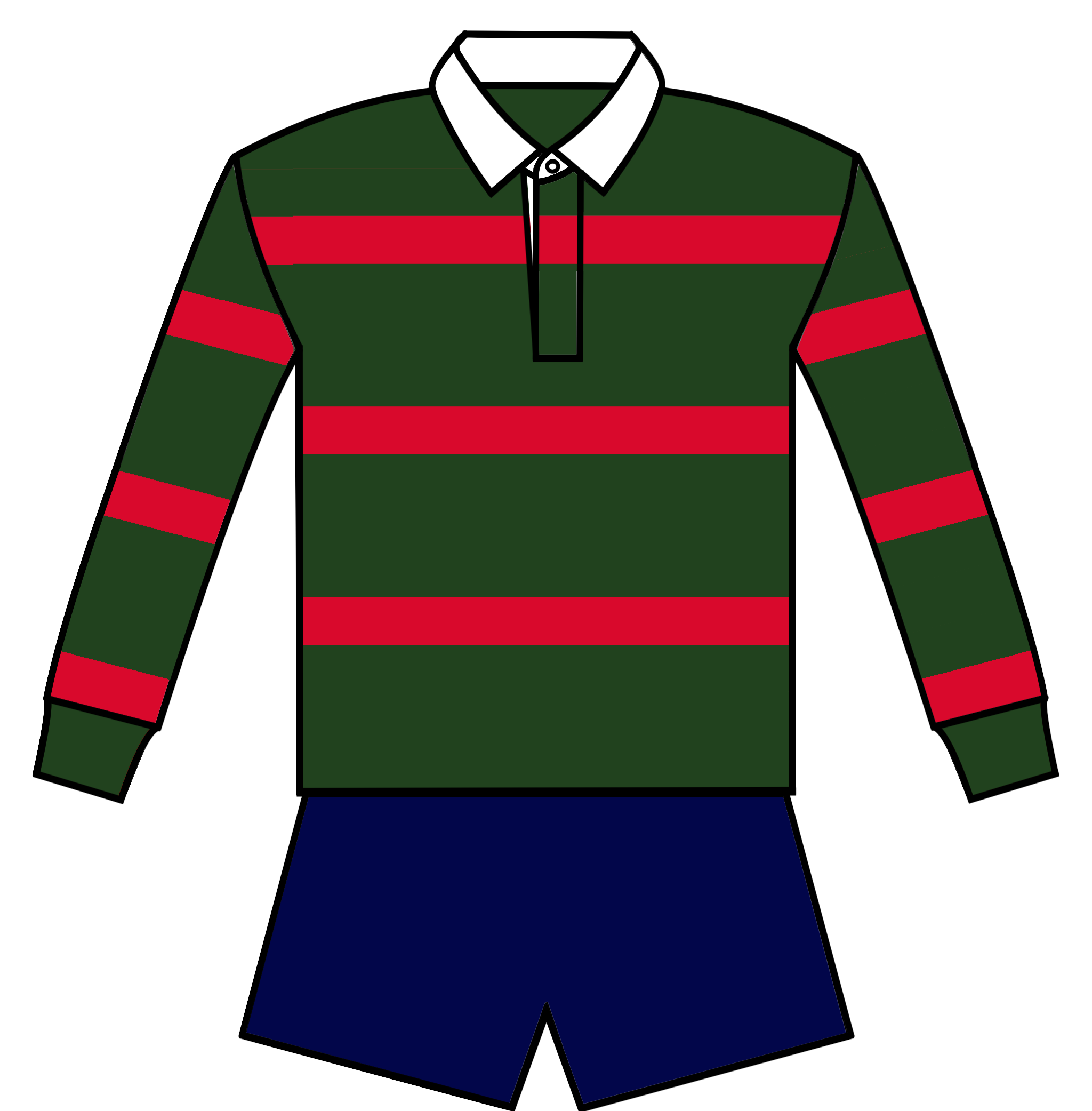
South Sydney; 11th season Ground: RAS Showground; Coach: Arthur Hennessy; Captain: Howard Hallett

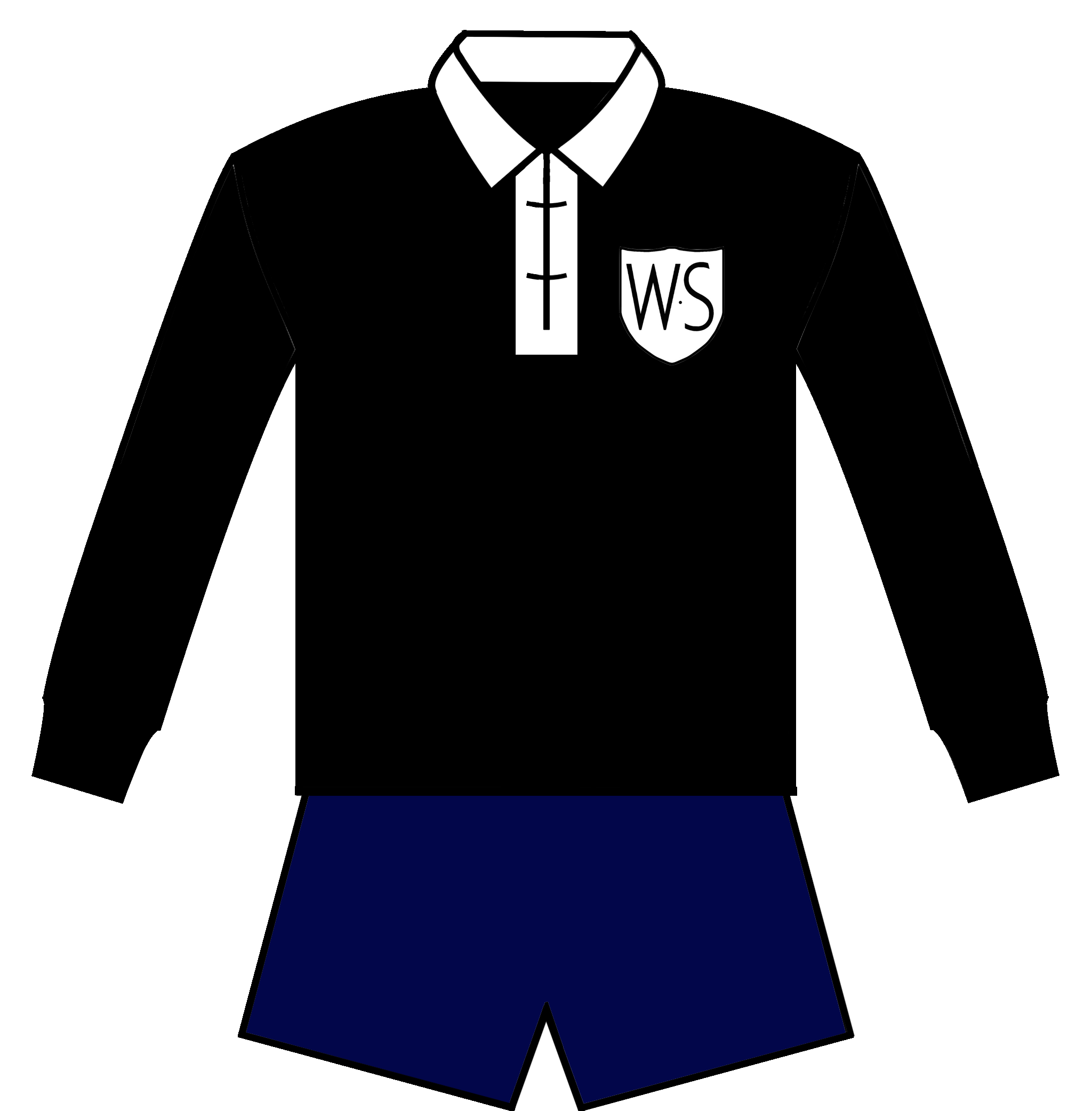
Western Suburbs; 11th season Ground: St. Luke's Oval; Coach:Tedda Courtney; Captain: Herb Gilbert

=== Ladder ===
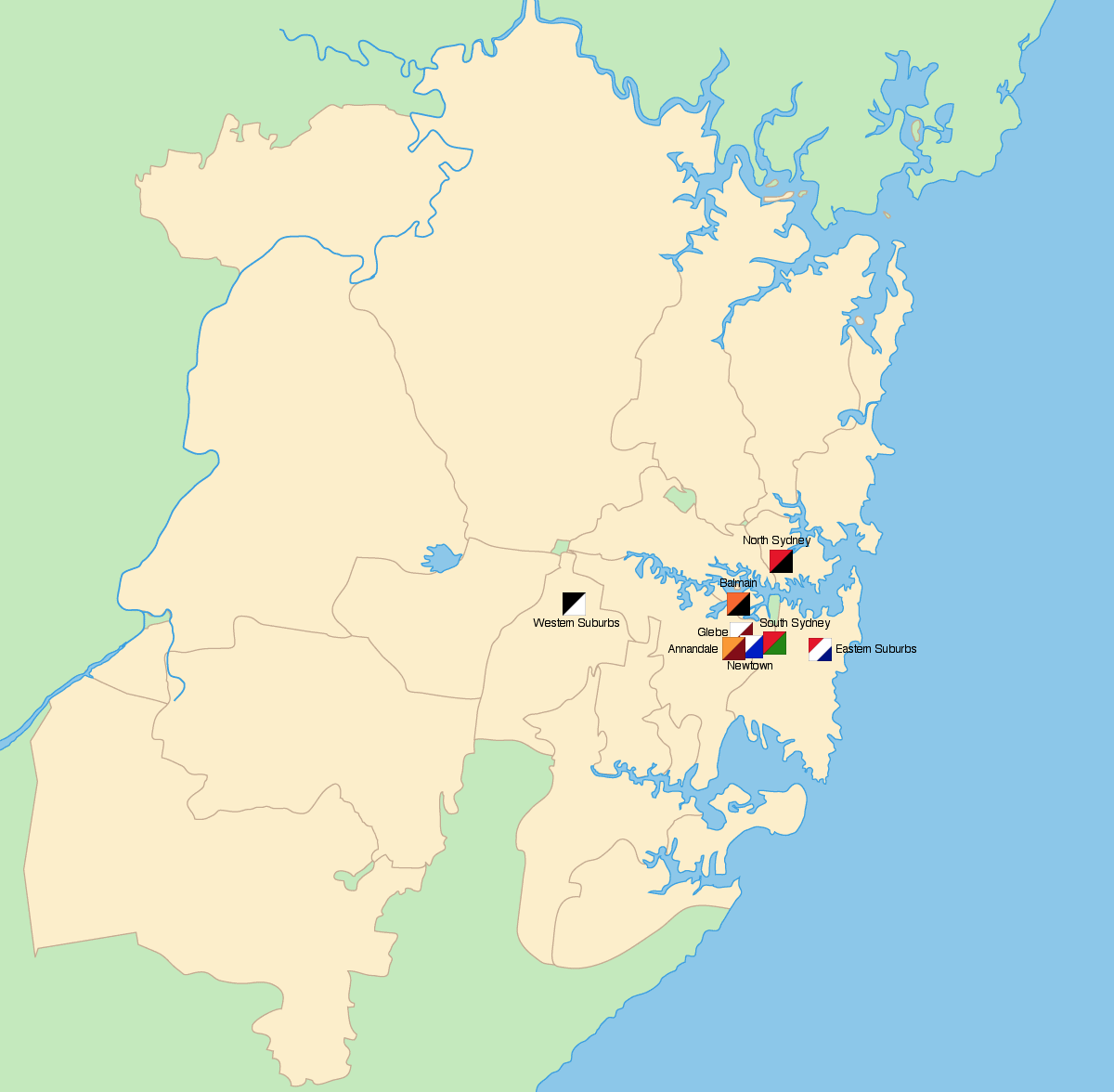
The geographical locations of the teams that contested the 1918 premiership across Sydney.

	Team	Pld	W	D	L	PF	PA	PD	Pts
1	South Sydney	14	12	0	2	257	121	+136	24
2	Western Suburbs	14	11	0	3	182	102	+80	22
3	Glebe	14	9	0	5	212	128	+84	18
4	Balmain	14	8	1	5	215	148	+67	17
5	Eastern Suburbs	14	8	0	6	160	153	+7	16
6	North Sydney	14	3	2	9	131	202	-71	8
7	Newtown	14	2	3	9	115	175	-60	7
8	Annandale	14	0	0	14	73	316	-243	0
