= James Brassill =

Australian rugby league footballer

Personal information
- Full name: James Leo Brassill
- Born: 28 March 1890 Yass, New South Wales, Australia
- Died: 11 November 1974 (aged 84)

Playing information
- Position: Wing, Centre
Club
Years	Team	Pld	T	G	FG	P
1912–14	Annandale	19	4	0	0	12
1915–18	Balmain	21	9	0	0	27
	Total	40	13	0	0	39
Representative
Years	Team	Pld	T	G	FG	P
1914	Metropolis	2	3	0	0	9
- Source: As of 24 April 2023

James Brassill (28 March 1890 – 11 November 1974) was an Australian former professional rugby league footballer who played in the 1910s. He played for Balmain and Annandale in the New South Wales Rugby Football League (NSWRFL).

== Playing career ==
Brassill made his first grade debut for Annandale in round 11 of the 1912 NSWRFL season against Newtown at Wentworth Park. In 1914, Brassill earned selection for the Metropolis team and scored a hat-trick on his representative debut against Newcastle. Brassill spent three years with the Annandale club with his last season at The Dales ending in a Wooden Spoon. In 1915, Brassill joined Balmain and played ten matches as the club won their first premiership. Balmain were not required to play in a premiership final as the rules of the time adopted the "first past the post" method. In 1917, Brassill won his second premiership with Balmain as they finished eight points clear of South Sydney. Brassill played a further season with Balmain in 1918 scoring four tries in six games.
