= Charlie Hedley =

Australian rugby league footballer

Personal information
- Full name: Charles Hedley
- Born: 1881; Newcastle, New South Wales
- Died: 13 August 1942 (age 61); Leichhardt, New South Wales

Playing information
Club
Years	Team	Pld	T	G	FG	P
1908	Glebe	5	0	0	0	0
1910–11	Annandale	23	0	19	0	38
	Total	28	0	19	0	38
Representative
Years	Team	Pld	T	G	FG	P
1907–08	New South Wales	6	0	0	0	0
1908–09	Australia	3	0	0	0	0
- Source: As of 25 June 2019

Charlie Hedley (1881–1942) was a pioneer Australian rugby league footballer. He was one of his country's first national representative players appearing in the inaugural professional series against New Zealand in 1907 and making the 1908–09 Kangaroo tour of Great Britain.

== Playing career ==
Hedley had been a Glebe rugby union player before he joined the Glebe rugby league club in its inaugural 1908 season. He had been one of the pioneers who was barred from the amateur code when selected in the inaugural New South Wales professional rugby side who met Albert Baskiville's rebel All Golds when the arrived in Sydney in 1907 for a series played in rugby union rules.

He was selected to play at fullback in the first ever trans-Tasman test, which was debut match of the Australia national rugby league team.

Following his first season with Glebe in 1908 – the inaugural season for rugby league in Australia, he was selected as part of the Australia national rugby league team to go on the 1908–09 Kangaroo tour of Great Britain. He played in seventeen matches of the tour including the third Test against England.

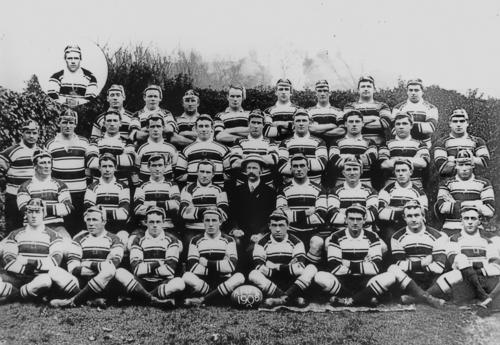
Hedley (seated, 2nd from left) Pioneer Kangaroos 1908–09

Upon his return he played two season with the Annandale club in Sydney.

He was awarded Life Membership of the New South Wales Rugby League in 1914.

== Death ==
Hedley died suddenly at his Leichhardt home on 13 August 1942 with his wife and two children at his side. He was buried at Rookwood Cemetery on Saturday 15 August 1942.
