= Jim Pye =

Australian rugby league footballer

Personal information
- Full name: James W Pye
- Born: 7 April 1892 Leichhardt, New South Wales
- Died: 23 July 1971 (aged 79) Newport, New South Wales

Playing information
- Position: Prop
Club
Years	Team	Pld	T	G	FG	P
1914–15	Annandale	21	0	0	0	0
1920–23	North Sydney	50	7	0	0	21
	Total	71	7	0	0	21
Representative
Years	Team	Pld	T	G	FG	P
1922	Metropolis	1	0	0	0	0
- Relatives: Jack Pye (brother)

James Pye (1892 – 23 July 1971) was an Australian rugby league footballer who played in the 1910s and 1920s.

== Personal life ==
Pye was born at Leichhardt, New South Wales in 1892. He died on 23 July 1971 at Newport, New South Wales.

== Playing career ==
He initially played with the Annandale for two seasons between 1914-1915. After moving to the North Sydney district in 1920, he turned out for North Sydney during the early 1920s. He played four seasons with North Sydney between 1920-1923, and played prop-forward in the 1922 Grand Final. Jim Pye was the younger brother of the rugby league footballer; Jack Pye.

Pye represented New South Wales reserve team on two occasions in 1919 and 1921 and Metropolis on one occasion in 1922.
