= Sam Perry (rugby league) =

NZ rugby league footballer (1887-1950)

Personal information
- Full name: Samuel Oakley Perry
- Born: 31 January 1887 Dunedin, Otago, New Zealand
- Died: 12 May 1950 (aged 63)

Playing information
- Position: Prop, Second-row
Club
Years	Team	Pld	T	G	FG	P
1910–11	Western Suburbs	24	6	0	0	18
1912–20	Annandale	46	3	0	0	9
	Total	70	9	0	0	27
Representative
Years	Team	Pld	T	G	FG	P
1912	Metropolis	2	0	0	0	0
- Source: As of 16 October 2025

Samuel Oakley Perry was a New Zealand former professional rugby league footballer who played in the 1910s and 1920s. He played for Western Suburbs and Annandale in the NSWRL competition.

== Playing career ==
Perry made his first grade debut for Western Suburbs in round 4 of the 1910 NSWRFL season against Glebe at St Luke's Park. Perry made 11 appearances in his debut season as the club finished with the Wooden Spoon. In 1912, Perry joined Annandale and became one of their longest serving players making 46 appearances. Perry's time at Annandale was not successful with the club finishing with the wooden spoon in 1914 and going winless in 1920 which would also be their last year in the competition. Perry played two representative matches for Metropolis, the earlier version of the NSW City rugby league team.
