= Thomas Dagg =

Australian rugby league footballer

Personal information
- Full name: Thomas Dagg

Playing information
- Position: Prop, Second-row
Club
Years	Team	Pld	T	G	FG	P
1916–17	Annandale	27	2	0	0	6
1918	Newtown	2	0	0	0	0
1919	Annandale	11	0	0	0	0
	Total	40	2	0	0	6
- Source: As of 21 April 2023

Thomas Dagg was an Australian former professional rugby league footballer who played in the 1910s. He played for Annandale and Newtown in the NSWRL competition.

== Playing career ==
Dagg made his first grade debut in round 1 of the 1916 NSWRFL season against Eastern Suburbs at Wentworth Park. Dagg played 27 games for Annandale in his first spell at the club which saw them finish second last in both seasons. In 1918, he joined Newtown but only played two matches. In 1919, he re-joined Annandale where he played 11 games. The club would once again finish second last on the table and avoided the Wooden Spoon due to for and against.
