= Jack Pye (rugby league) =

Australian rugby league footballer

Personal information
- Full name: John Thomas Pye
- Born: 11 March 1890; Leichhardt, New South Wales
- Died: 17 March 1973 (aged 83); Newport, New South Wales

Playing information
- Position: Prop
Club
| Years | Team | Pld | T | G | FG | P |
|---|---|---|---|---|---|---|
| 1914–16 | Annandale | 14 | 1 | 0 | 0 | 3 |
| 1919 | Glebe | 13 | 0 | 0 | 0 | 0 |
| | Total | 27 | 1 | 0 | 0 | 3 |
Representative
| Years | Team | Pld | T | G | FG | P |
| 1919–21 | New South Wales | 5 | 1 | 0 | 0 | 3 |
| 1915–20 | Metropolis | 2 | 1 | 0 | 0 | 3 |
- Relatives: Jim Pye (brother)

John Thomas 'Jack' Pye (1890-1973) was an Australian rugby league footballer who played in the 1910s and 1920s.

== Playing career ==
Pye was born in Leichhardt, New South Wales in 1890, and was a member of the Annandale rugby league club for three seasons between 1914 and 1916. He turned out for Glebe for one season in 1919. His represented Sydney (Metropolis) in 1915 and 1920. He represented New South Wales five times between 1919 and 1921. Pye was the older brother of the rugby league footballer; Jim Pye.

== Death ==
Pye died on 17 March 1973 at Newport, New South Wales aged 83.
