= Charles McMurtrie =

Australian dual-code rugby player

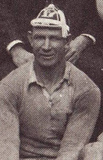
- McMurtrie in 1911

Personal information
- Full name: Charles McMurtrie
- Born: 1 May 1878 Orange, New South Wales, Australia
- Died: 9 August 1951 (aged 73) Carlton, New South Wales, Australia

Playing information

Rugby union
- Position: Forward
Club
Years	Team	Pld	T	G	FG	P
	New South Wales
	West Australia RU
	Total	0	0	0	0	0
Representative
Years	Team	Pld	T	G	FG	P
1908	Australia	1

Rugby league
Club
Years	Team	Pld	T	G	FG	P
1911–15	Balmain	15	5	0	0	15
Representative
Years	Team	Pld	T	G	FG	P
1911	New South Wales	1	0	0	0	0
1911–12	Australia
- Source: Yesterday's Hero
Medals
Men's rugby union
Representing Australasia
Olympic Games
Gold medal – first place	1908 London	Team competition

Charles "Jeff" McMurtrie (1 May 1878 – 9 August 1951) was a pioneer Australian rugby union and rugby league footballer who represented his country at both sports. He competed in rugby union at the 1908 Summer Olympics and was an early dual-code rugby international.

== Rugby union ==
McMurtrie won Olympic Gold in London in 1908 playing rugby union for the Wallabies in the team captained by Chris McKivat.

== Rugby league career ==
On his return to Australia, he joined the fledgling code of rugby league along with a number of his Olympic teammates. He was selected in 1911 for the 2nd Kangaroo tour of Great Britain and played in 7 tour matches, scoring 3 tries. He is listed on the Australian Players Register as Kangaroo No. 81.

Along with Peter Burge and Bob Stuart, McMurtie made his international league debut in a tour match in 1911 but did not play in any tests. Collectively they were Australia's 17th to 19th dual code rugby internationals.

== See also ==
- Rugby union at the 1908 Summer Olympics
