= Edward Burdett (rugby league) =

Australian rugby league footballer

Personal information
- Full name: Edward Burdett

Playing information
- Position: Prop, Second-row
Club
Years	Team	Pld	T	G	FG	P
1908–10	Newtown	25	8	5	0	34
1911–14	Annandale	31	4	0	0	12
1915–17	Newtown	38	1	1	0	0
1919	Annandale	7	0	0	0	0
	Total	101	13	6	0	46
Representative
Years	Team	Pld	T	G	FG	P
1911	New South Wales	1	0	0	0	0
1911	Metropolis	1	0	0	0	0
- Source: As of 20 April 2023

Edward Burdett was an Australian former professional rugby league footballer who played in the 1900s and 1910s. He played for Annandale and Newtown in the NSWRL competition.

== Playing career ==
Burdett made his first grade debut for Newtown in the inaugural round of the NSWRL competition in Australia. The match was played against Eastern Suburbs at Wentworth Park. Eastern Suburbs ran out 32-16 winners. In 1910, Burdett played 14 games for Newtown but missed out on playing in the clubs first premiership victory. In 1911, Burdett joined Annandale where he played for three years before returning to Newtown. After his second spell at Newtown ended, Burdett returned to Annandale where he played one final season in 1919. Burdett represented both New South Wales and Metropolis once in 1911.
