= George Bain (rugby league, born 1892) =

Australian rugby league footballer

Personal information
- Full name: George William Bain
- Born: 8 January 1892; Leichhardt, New South Wales
- Died: 3 May 1948 (aged 56); Camperdown, New South Wales

Playing information
- Position: Centre
Club
Years	Team	Pld	T	G	FG	P
1912	Annandale	3	0	0	0	0
1913–20	Newtown	79	24	36	1	146
1921	Glebe	5	1	0	0	3
	Total	87	25	36	1	149
Representative
Years	Team	Pld	T	G	FG	P
1914	New South Wales	1	0	0	0	0
1914	Metropolis	1	0	0	0	0

George Bain (1892-1948) was an Australian rugby league footballer who played in the 1910s and 1920s.

== Background ==
Bain was born at Leichhardt, New South Wales in 1892.

== Playing career ==
Bain went on to have a long career in the NSWRFL. He started his career at Annandale in 1912 for one season. He then switched to Newtown for eight seasons between 1913-1920. During this period he represented New South Wales on one occasions in 1914. Bain finished his career at Glebe in 1921.

Bain died on 3 May 1948, aged 56.
