= Walter Haddock =

Australian rugby league footballer

Personal information
- Full name: Walter Bede Dally Haddock
- Born: 22 June 1890; Wellington, New South Wales, Australia
- Died: 9 September 1972 (aged 82); Punchbowl, New South Wales

Playing information
- Position: Hooker, Second-row
Club
Years	Team	Pld	T	G	FG	P
1910–12	Annandale	36	1	1	0	5
1913–14	Newtown	21	2	0	0	6
1916–20	Annandale	39	6	1	0	19
1921–23	Glebe	27	2	0	0	6
	Total	123	11	2	0	36
Representative
Years	Team	Pld	T	G	FG	P
1912–13	New South Wales	4	1	0	0	3

Walter Bede Dally Haddock (1890–1972) was a pioneer Australian rugby league footballer who played in the 1910s and 1920s.

== Playing career ==
Walter 'Fisho' Haddock played 13 seasons of first grade rugby league in Sydney. He started his career at the Annandale club, playing four seasons between 1910 and 1913. He then shifted to the Newtown club for two seasons (1914–1915) before returning to Annandale for four more years between 1916 and 1920, and he became Annandale's longest serving first grade player. When the Annandale club folded in 1920, Haddock played out his career at Glebe for three years before retiring in 1923.

Haddock played for New South Wales on four occasions in 1912 and 1913. He also represented Sydney(Metropolis) on three occasions in 1913, 1914 and 1919.

Haddock died on 9 September 1972, aged 81 late of Punchbowl, New South Wales.
