= Bob Stuart (rugby) =

Australia international rugby union & league player

- Born: Robert Claude Stuart; 13 June 1887 Annandale, NSW
- Died: 25 March 1959 (aged 71) Drummoyne, New South Wales

Rugby union career
- Position: flanker
Amateur team(s)
Years	Team	Apps	(Points)
- Glebe RUFC
International career
Years	Team	Apps	(Points)
1910	Wallabies	2	(0)
- Rugby league career

Playing information
Club
Years	Team	Pld	T	G	FG	P
1911–18	Annandale	45	10	0	0	30
Representative
Years	Team	Pld	T	G	FG	P
1911–12	Australia	1	0	0	0	0

Robert Stuart (1887–1959) was an Australian rugby union and rugby league footballer and represented his country at both sports - a dual-code rugby international.

Born in Annandale, New South Wales, Stuart represented for the Wallabies as a flanker in the drawn two Test series in 1910 against the touring All Blacks.

After switching to the professional code in 1911 he was selected to tour Great Britain with the 1911–12 Kangaroo tour of Great Britain led by Chris McKivat. He played in two tour matches. Stuart is listed on the Australian Players Register as Kangaroo No. 84.

Along with Charles McMurtie and Peter Burge, Stuart made his international league debut in a 1911 tour match but did not play in any Tests. Collectively they are likely to have been Australia's 17th to 19th dual code rugby internationals.

Robert Stuart had five children and lived in Drummoyne NSW.

== Sources ==
- Andrews, Malcolm (2006) The ABC of Rugby League, Austn Broadcasting Corpn, Sydney
- Whiticker, Alan & Hudson, Glen (2006) The Encyclopedia of Rugby League Players, Gavin Allen Publishing, Sydney
- Whiticker, Alan (2004) Captaining the Kangaroos, New Holland, Sydney
