= Annandale (rugby league team) =

Defunct Australian rugby league club, based in Annandale, NSW

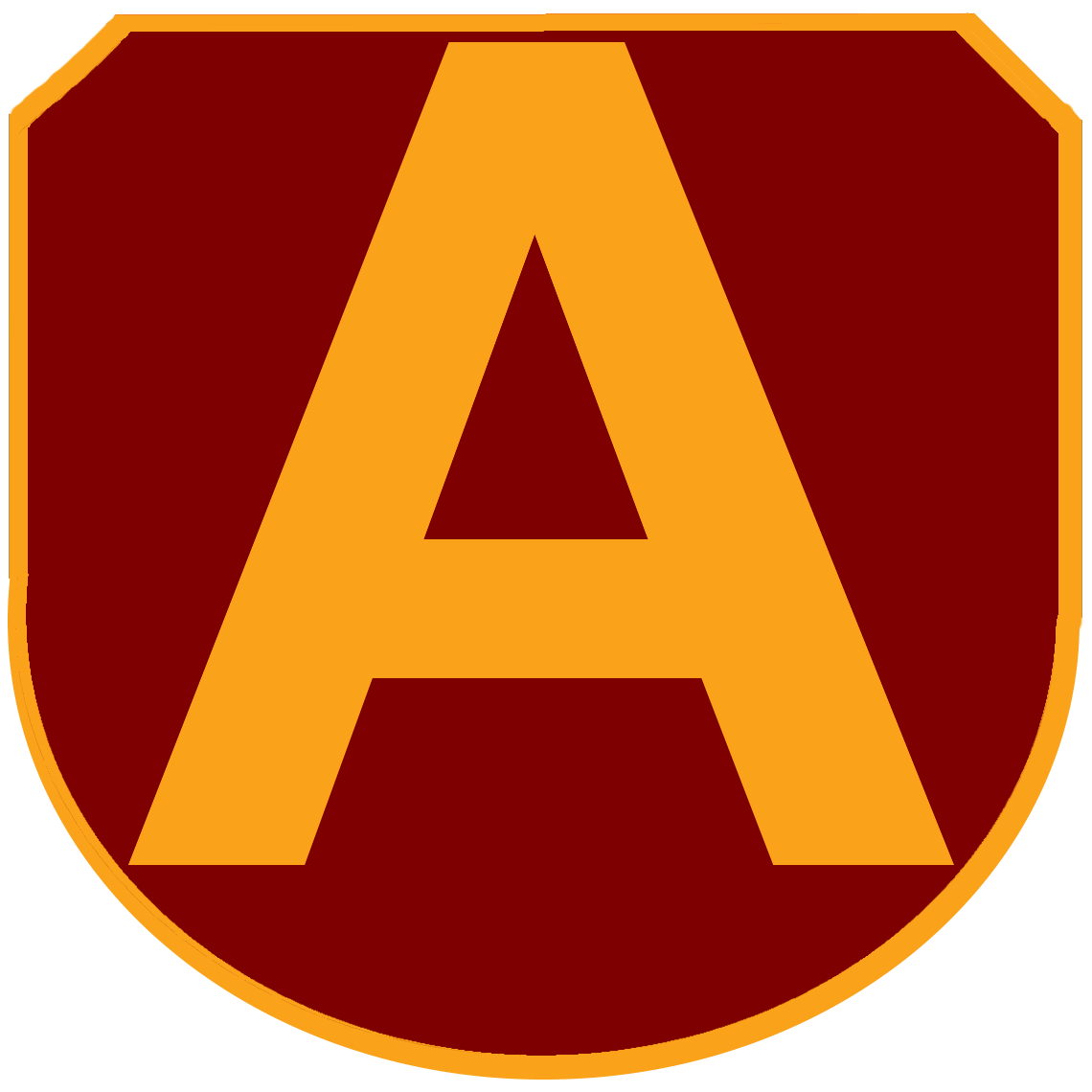

Club information
- Full name: Annandale District Rugby League Football Club
- Nickname: The Dales
- Short name: Annandale
- Founded: 10 April 1910; 116 years ago as Annandale
- Exited: 1920; 106 years ago

Former details
- Ground: Wentworth Park Glebe, Sydney (20,000)
- Competition: NSWRFL
- Wooden spoons: 3 (1914, 1918, 1920)

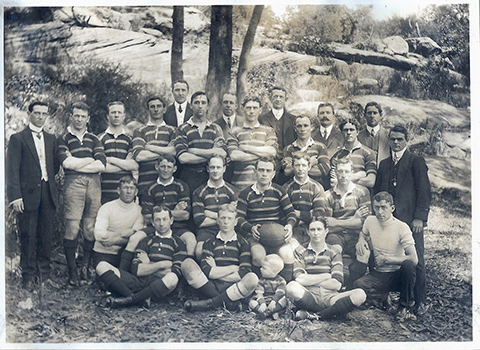
Annandale RLFC 1912

Annandale were an Australian rugby league football club which played in the New South Wales Rugby Football League premiership from 1910 to 1920. Based in Annandale, New South Wales and nicknamed "The Dales", the club's colours were red and gold.

The club was never able to finish higher than fifth in their eleven-year history and won just one match in their final three seasons. At the insistence of South Sydney this, combined with the industrialisation of the area led to their omission from the competition for further seasons at the end of 1920. All these events are often attributed to the fact that fewer players were eligible to play under the residency rules in place at the time (Glebe would also later fall victim, in part, to this phenomenon).

== History ==
Annandale were initially a second grade feeder club for Glebe in the Metropolitan Rugby Union competition. Glebe would later join the NSWRL competition along with the Newtown, Balmain and South Sydney clubs. The Metropolitan Rugby Union board later expelled and banned the Annandale players who competed in the exhibition game which gave way to Annandale switching from rugby union to rugby league.

Annandale began their first season with a very poor start, losing their first four games straight which as it turned out sent them immediately out of the race for the premiership. They did, however, recover well and finished with five wins, one draw and eight losses. The first of these wins came in round 5 against a Western Suburbs side that had won just 3 out of 23 matches in their three-year history. At the end of the season, Annandale finished sixth out of the eight teams.

The 1911 season was arguably Annandale's most successful, managing to win five of their fourteen games, equalling their performance in the previous year. However, they were able to finish one place higher on the ladder, in fifth position.

In 1912 the club were able to claim an 8–5 win against Balmain in the second round of the season but followed this up with eleven losses in a row. In equal last position with Western Suburbs heading into the final round of the season, the two clubs by coincidence were scheduled to play their final match of the season against one another. Despite having lost to Western Suburbs in round seven, Annandale won the match 15–6, avoiding them claiming the wooden spoon.

Chart of yearly table positions for Annandale in First Grade NSWRL

As it turned out, the scenario for Annandale in the final rounds of the 1913 season were similar to those they experienced in 1912. They were again in equal last position with Western Suburbs with two rounds to play and up against one another in a match which would most likely decide who would finish last. Replicating their win from the previous season, Annandale took out the match 18–0. Although they lost their last match of the season narrowly to second-placed Newtown 10–8 whilst Western Suburbs won their own match, Annandale are deemed to have avoided the last place due to a superior points scoring difference despite finishing on equal competition points.

The club claimed just one draw from their first eleven games of the 1914 season, leaving them in last position and three points behind Western Suburbs. The two teams travelled to Goulburn, with Annandale needing to win to avoid receiving their first wooden spoon. In this match, however, Western Suburbs won 6–4, ensuring Annandale were to finish last. Although claiming an elusive win, their only one of the season, against three-time defending premiers Eastern Suburbs in the second last round of the season, their effort was futile as they took out their first wooden spoon.

In 1915 the club got three wins, including another one against Western Suburbs in the final match of the season, to finish two points clear of last-placed North Sydney and Western Suburbs. In 1916 they began the season poorly, winning just one of their first ten games and leaving them two points behind Western Suburbs in last position. They were then able to win three games in a row and ended up finishing seventh. The 1917 season was more of the same for the club, losing their first nine matches before claiming two draws in the next three weeks. In a match against equal last North Sydney in the second last round of the season, Annandale prevailed in a close match 3–2 meaning they were again able to narrowly avoid the wooden spoon.

Annandale were unable to win a game in 1918, scoring ten points or more just twice whilst conceding ten points or less on just two occasions. They won just one match in 1919, an important second-last round match against North Sydney which was to again decide who would finish in last position. This victory allowed them to finish seventh despite having won just the one match. In 1920 they once again failed to win a match and lost by less than 9 points on only one occasion.

== Seasons ==
Note: P=Premiers, R=Runners-Ups, M=Minor Premierships, F=Finals Appearance, W=Wooden Spoons (Brackets Represent Finals Games)

Competition	Games Played (FINALS)	Games Won (FINALS)	Games Drawn (FINALS)	Games Lost (FINALS)	Ladder Position	City Cup	P	R	M	F	W	Captain	Notes
1910 NSWRFL season	14	5	1	8	6/8	–						Charlie Hedley	
1911 NSWRFL season	14	5	1	8	5/8	–						Charlie Hedley	
1912 NSWRFL season	14	2	0	12	7/8	Round 1						Frank Gressier	
1913 NSWRFL season	14	3	0	11	7/8	Semi-Finals						Patrick McCue, Ray Norman	
1914 NSWRFL season	14	1	1	12	8/8	Round 1					X	William Lindsay	
1915 NSWRFL season	14	3	0	11	6/8	Round 1						Bob Stuart	
1916 NSWRFL season	14	4	0	10	7/8	Round 1						Walter Haddock	
1917 NSWRFL season	14	1	2	11	7/8	Round 1						Walter Haddock	
1918 NSWRFL season	14	0	0	14	8/8	Round 1					X	William Geoghegan	
1919 NSWRFL season	14	1	1	12	7/8	Round 1						William Geoghegan	
1920 NSWRFL season	13	0	0	13	9/9	Round 1					X	Tom McGuinness	

== NSWRFL players ==
Name	First Yr	Last Yr	Apps	Tries	Goals	FG	Pts
Charles Archer	1915	1915	2	-	-	-	-
John Ayling	1914	1916	18	2	-	-	6
George Bain	1912	1912	12	-	-	-	-
James Bain	1915	1920	61	16	1	-	50
Alick Bates	1915	1919	19	-	-	-	-
Arthur Beardmore	1915	1920	6	-	-	-	-
Walter Beaumont	1919	1920	3	-	-	-	-
Alfred Berry	1911	1911	1	-	-	-	-
Charles Bingle	1910	1915	14	2	-	-	6
Percy Bolt	1911	1911	1	-	-	-	-
Harold Boyle	1912	1912	1	-	-	-	-
James Brassill	1912	1914	19	4	-	-	12
Arthur Brown	1914	1918	10	-	-	-	-
R. Brown	1920	1920	8	-	-	-	-
Thomas Brownlee	1910	1915	26	3	-	-	9
Andrew Bryant	1910	1910	9	1	-	-	3
Len Bryant	1916	1916	4	-	-	-	-
W. Buist	1915	1917	24	1	3	-	9
Ernie Burdett	1911	1919	38	4	-	-	12
Arthur Butler	1918	1919	21	-	-	-	-
George Challis	1912	1917	38	-	9	-	18
Alex Clough	1910	1910	1	-	-	-	-
Os Clutton	1910	1910	6	1	1	1	7
Patrick Coll	1915	1920	55	2	-	-	6
Denis Comerford	1918	1919	9	-	-	-	-
John Comerford	1918	1919	5	-	-	-	-
Albert Compton	1920	1920	10	2	-	-	6
Harold Corbett	1913	1913	3	-	-	-	-
Matthew Cusack	1918	1918	12	-	-	-	-
Thomas Dagg	1916	1919	38	2	-	-	6
Bill Daley	1915	1915	1	-	-	-	-
Lou D'Alpuget	1911	1911	5	-	-	-	-
William Dibley	1912	1912	8	3	-	-	9
L. Dickson	1916	1916	1	-	-	-	-
William Doyle	1913	1916	19	3	37	-	83
William Eagle	1917	1917	8	-	-	-	-
George Eves	1915	1920	50	3	-	-	9
David Fitzgerald	1919	1919	8	-	1	-	2
Alfred Fox	1920	1920	1	-	-	-	-
Rhodse Frackes	1917	1917	1	-	-	-	-
Robert Fraser	1911	1912	12	1	-	-	3
Edward Garrett	1915	1915	6	-	-	-	-
William Geoghegan	1911	1919	46	9	1	-	29
Wallace Goddard	1917	1917	14	2	-	-	6
Robert Gough	1916	1918	34	3	8	-	25
Robert Graves	1919	1919	7	1	-	-	3
Robert Gray	1910	1913	35	1	-	-	3
Joe Gready	1918	1920	2	-	-	-	-
Dick Green	1911	1911	5	-	5	-	10
Frank Gressier	1911	1912	22	1	5	-	13
Edward Griffiths	1919	1919	5	-	-	-	-
John Groves	1910	1910	3	-	-	-	-
William Guilfoyle	1920	1920	1	-	-	-	-
Walter Haddock	1910	1920	80	7	2	-	25
James Heaney	1916	1916	14	-	1	-	2
Charlie Hedley	1910	1911	23	-	18	1	38
Alick Henderson	1910	1910	5	1	-	-	3
Walter Hogg	1913	1913	1	-	-	-	-
Snowy Holland	1910	1910	1	-	-	-	-
Sidney Hughes	1918	1920	17	4	7	-	26
H. Hunt	1920	1920	8	1	-	1	5
Herbert Ironside	1918	1918	1	-	-	-	-
George Jolly	1917	1920	49	11	-	-	33
Bede Kenna	1913	1914	2	1	1	-	5
Matthew Keogh	1920	1920	9	4	-	-	12
Thomas Knight	1913	1915	24	1	-	-	3
William Kyle	1912	1915	15	1	5	-	13
John Larkin	1915	1915	9	6	-	-	18
Angus Lennon	1910	1914	36	-	-	-	-
Jim Leonard	1912	1913	19	4	4	-	20
Percy Lillyman	1910	1913	29	7	-	-	21
Bill Lindsay	1912	1915	35	7	1	-	23
Roy Liston	1920	1920	12	1	2	-	7
Bill Lucas	1918	1920	27	1	-	-	3
Sydney Lyons	1910	1910	11	2	-	-	6
Patrick McCue	1913	1913	1	-	-	-	-
Nicholas McGuinness	1918	1920	32	-	-	-	-
Patrick McGuinness	1920	1920	2	-	-	-	-
Tom McGuinness	1915	1920	31	2	1	-	8
A. McGuire	1919	1919	1	-	-	-	-
James McPherson	1910	1912	2	1	-	-	3
George Munce	1911	1915	38	5	-	-	15
Bernard Norman	1910	1910	4	1	-	-	3
Ray Norman	1910	1913	48	12	26	-	88
Rex Norman	1910	1914	56	9	-	-	27
Roy Norman	1910	1915	31	16	3	-	54
Walter Palmer	1913	1917	54	2	11	-	28
Sam Parker	1914	1919	48	3	-	-	9
Harry Pearce	1912	1912	6	-	-	-	-
Sam Perry	1912	1920	46	3	-	-	9
Bert Pidcock	1918	1919	11	-	-	-	-
Henry Pidcock	1915	1916	17	5	-	-	15
Albert Potter	1920	1920	11	1	-	-	3
Jack Pye	1914	1916	25	4	-	-	12
Jim Pye	1914	1915	24	2	-	-	6
Frank Quigley	1920	1920	10	-	2	-	4
George Reynolds	1913	1913	13	2	-	-	6
Robert Rigby	1911	1911	1	-	-	-	-
A. Robinson	1915	1915	8	-	-	-	-
J. Robinson	1920	1920	1	-	-	-	-
John Rosewell	1911	1912	10	-	-	-	-
Norman Seach	1914	1914	3	-	-	-	-
Oscar Shirley	1919	1919	4	-	1	-	2
George Short	1910	1910	5	1	-	-	3
Joe Smith	1914	1914	6	-	-	-	-
Alex Stuart	1910	1910	12	2	-	-	6
Charles Stuart	1918	1920	15	-	-	-	-
Dan Stuart	1917	1917	2	-	-	-	-
Bob Stuart	1911	1918	45	10	-	-	30
William Stuart	1910	1910	4	-	-	-	-
William Thomas	1910	1913	34	1	-	-	3
Percy Upham	1919	1919	12	3	1	-	11
Ernie Usher	1918	1920	27	1	7	-	17
Lyall Wall	1913	1913	9	2	15	3	42
Archibald Wardley	1920	1920	1	-	-	-	-
Fred Wellington	1917	1917	11	-	-	-	-
Roland Westbrook	1913	1913	5	-	-	-	-
Arthur Wheatley	1914	1914	14	1	-	-	3
George Wilcox	1910	1911	21	8	-	-	24
Alex Williamson	1910	1910	1	1	-	-	3
James Woodward	1913	1914	22	2	-	-	6
John Wooll	1917	1919	22	1	-	-	3
Albert Wright	1920	1920	7				

== Statistics and records ==
Out of the 33 clubs that have contested in the premiership over the years, Annandale's performance is ranked as the second worst of all. Out of 153 games played, the club won 25, drew six and lost 122 for a winning percentage of 18.3%. As of 2025, only on seven occasions has a team failed to win a game in a season. Annandale achieved this twice, in 1918 and 1920.

=== Club records ===
Biggest Win

- 22 points, 25–3 against Western Suburbs at Wentworth Park on 29 July 1911.

Biggest Loss

- 49 points, 52–3 against Western Suburbs at Pratten Park on 31 July 1920.

Most Consecutive Wins

- 3 matches, 1 – 15 July 1916.

Most Consecutive Losses

- 16 matches, 18 July 1917 – 10 May 1919.

Record appearance holder

- Walter Haddock – 86 games

Record point scorer

- Ray Norman – 88 games

Wooden Spoons

- 1914, 1918, 1920

== See also ==
- List of rugby league clubs in Australia
