= 1917 NSWRFL season =

Rugby league competition

1917 New South Wales Rugby Football League
- Teams: 8
- Premiers: Balmain (3rd title)
- Minor premiers: Balmain (3rd title)
- Matches played: 56
- Points scored: 1280
- Top points scorer: Charles Fraser (67)
- Wooden spoon: North Sydney (2nd spoon)
- Top try-scorer: Harold Horder (17)

The 1917 New South Wales Rugby Football League premiership was the tenth season of Sydney's professional rugby league football club competition, Australia's first. Eight teams from across the city contested during the season and Balmain finished on top of the ladder to claim the premiership.

== Season summary ==
After nine seasons with only nineteen wins and two draws from 115 matches, Western Suburbs finally made a significant impact on the league, finishing a respectable third behind the traditionally strong sides of Balmain and South Sydney. Their advance was almost entirely due to centre Herb Gilbert, who moved from Easts, Hull F.C. and South Sydney to add skill and knowledge to team crying out for guidance, besides scoring nine of the team's thirty-four tries.

Balmain ultimately won their third consecutive premiership finishing eight points ahead of second placed South Sydney. The Balmain side only failed to win one of their games during the season against Newtown in round 8. In fourteen games Balmain’s secure defence allowed a mere 61 points and just nine tries to be scored against them, a statistic indicating their dominance and rivalled since only by St. George in 1963. Annandale managed to avoid bottom spot thanks to Glebe surrendering their two points to them following a 31–5 win for Glebe in round 8. The points were moved over to Annandale due to Glebe fielding Dan “Laddo” Davies – an ineligible player under the residential criteria of the time.

As well as losing Davies, fourteen of Glebe’s first grade players were suspended for a year after the players boycotted a match against Balmain. The NSWRFL changed the venue of the game from the Sydney Cricket Ground to Birchgrove Oval in Balmain, drastically reducing spectator numbers and, in doing so, cutting Glebe's share of the big gate takings expected at the SCG. A team consisting of lower grade players was fielded and Glebe lost heavily, 40–9. The NSWRFL suspended all the footballers who refused to play, including Frank, Laidley and Albert Burge.

Balmain also won the three round City Cup played in the late season. Members of the Balmain premiership winning side included Bob Craig, Bill Schultz and E. Burnicle.

=== Teams ===
The teams remained unchanged from the previous season.

- Annandale
- Balmain, formed on 23 January 1908 at Balmain Town Hall
- Eastern Suburbs, formed on 24 January 1908 at Paddington Town Hall
- Glebe, formed on 9 January 1908
- Newtown, formed on 14 January 1908
- North Sydney, formed on 7 February 1908
- South Sydney, formed on 17 January 1908 at Redfern Town Hall
- Western Suburbs, formed on 4 February 1908

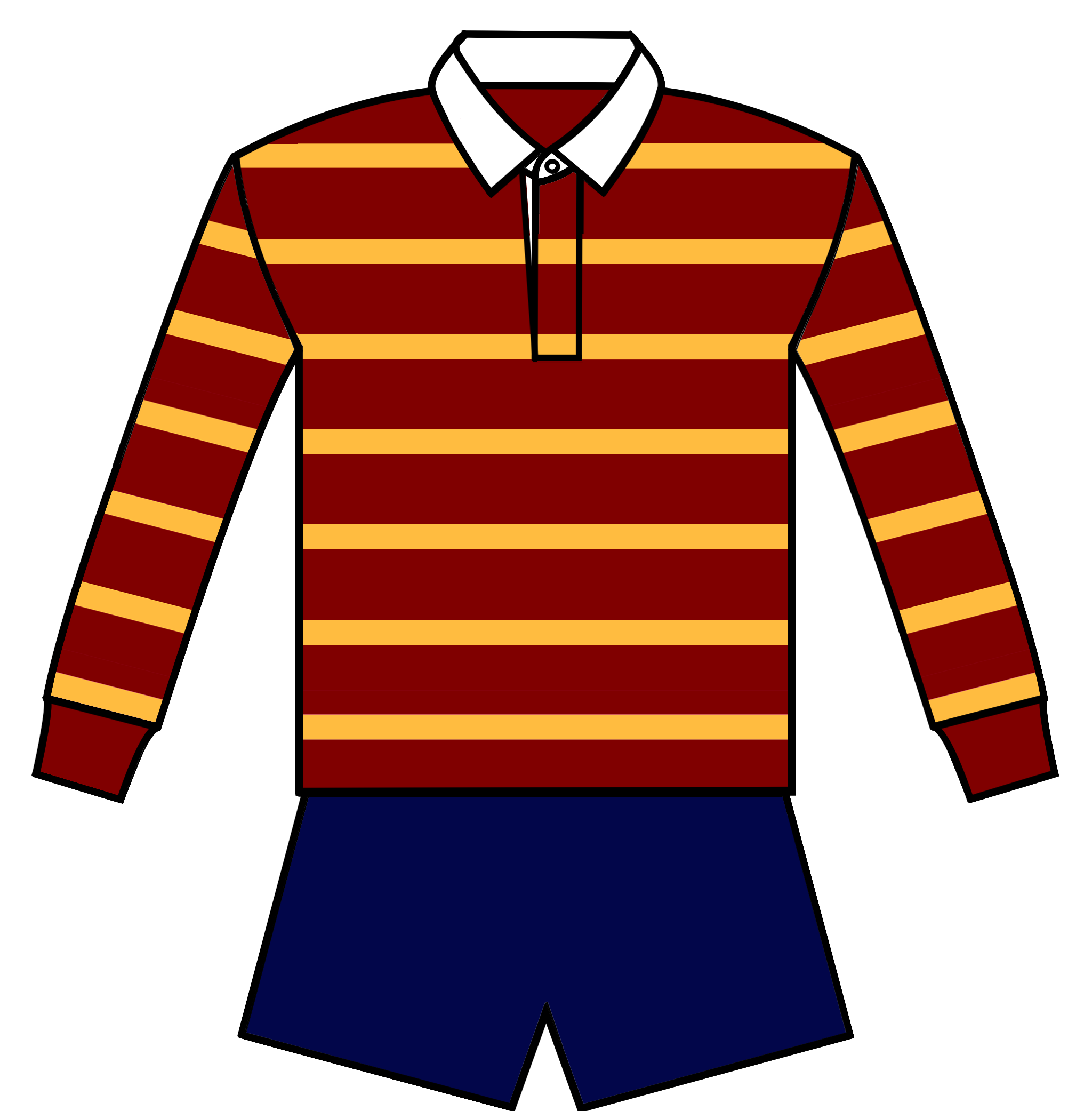
Annandale; 8th season Ground: Wentworth Park; Coach: Captain: Walter Haddock

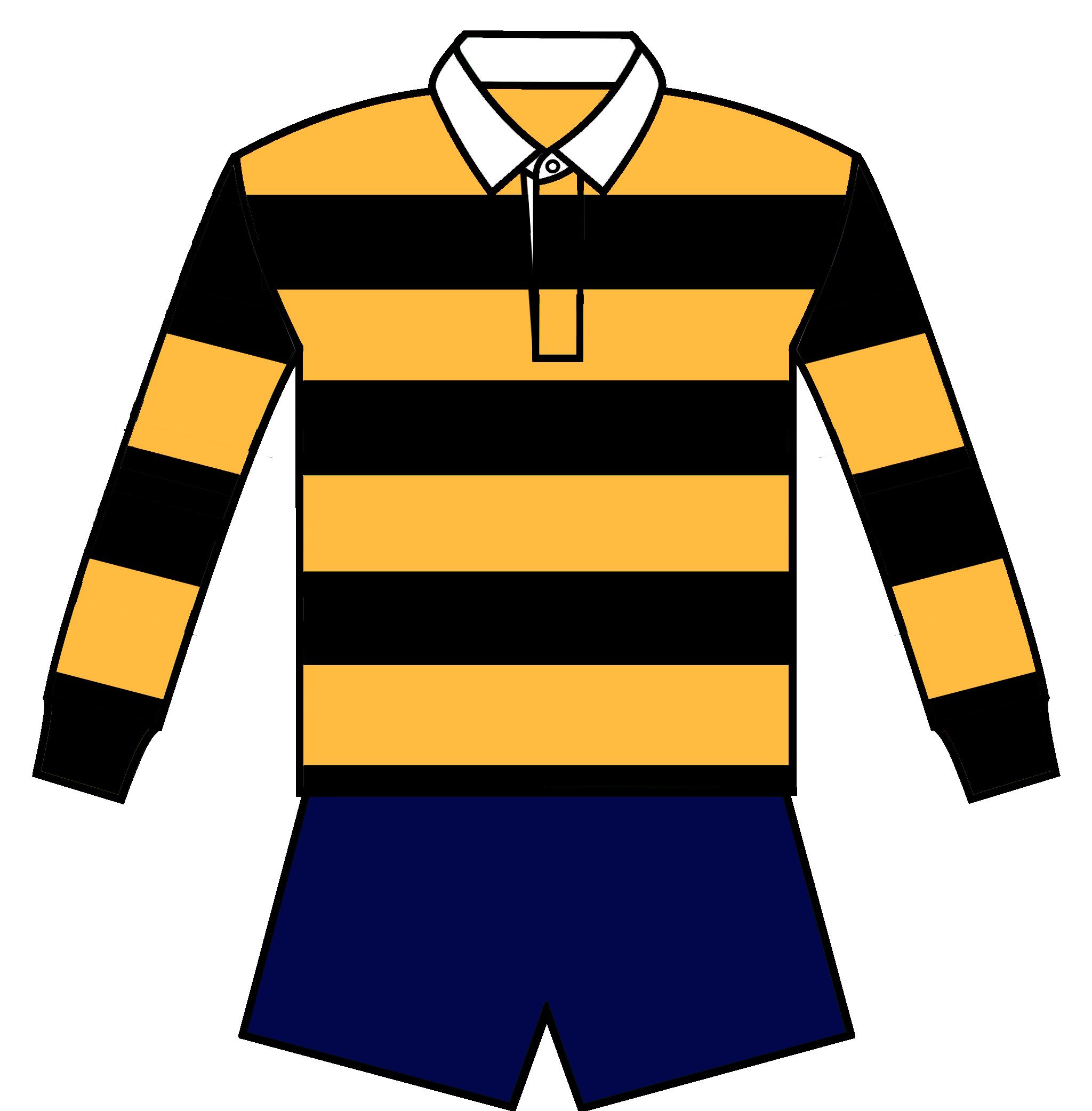
Balmain; 10th season Ground: Birchgrove Oval; Coach-Captain: Arthur Halloway

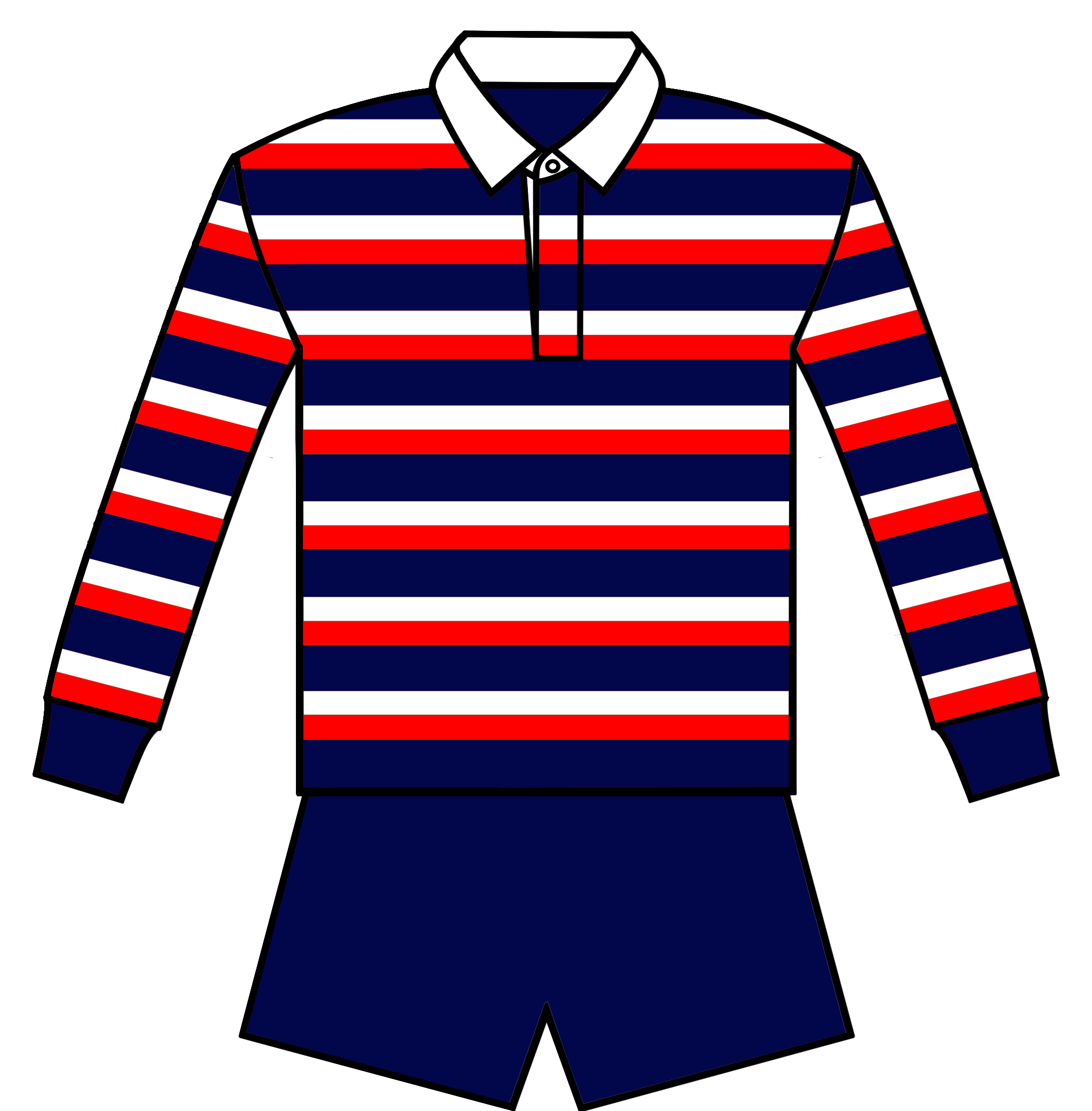
Eastern Suburbs; 10th season Ground: Sydney Sports Ground; Coach: Captain: Sandy Pearce

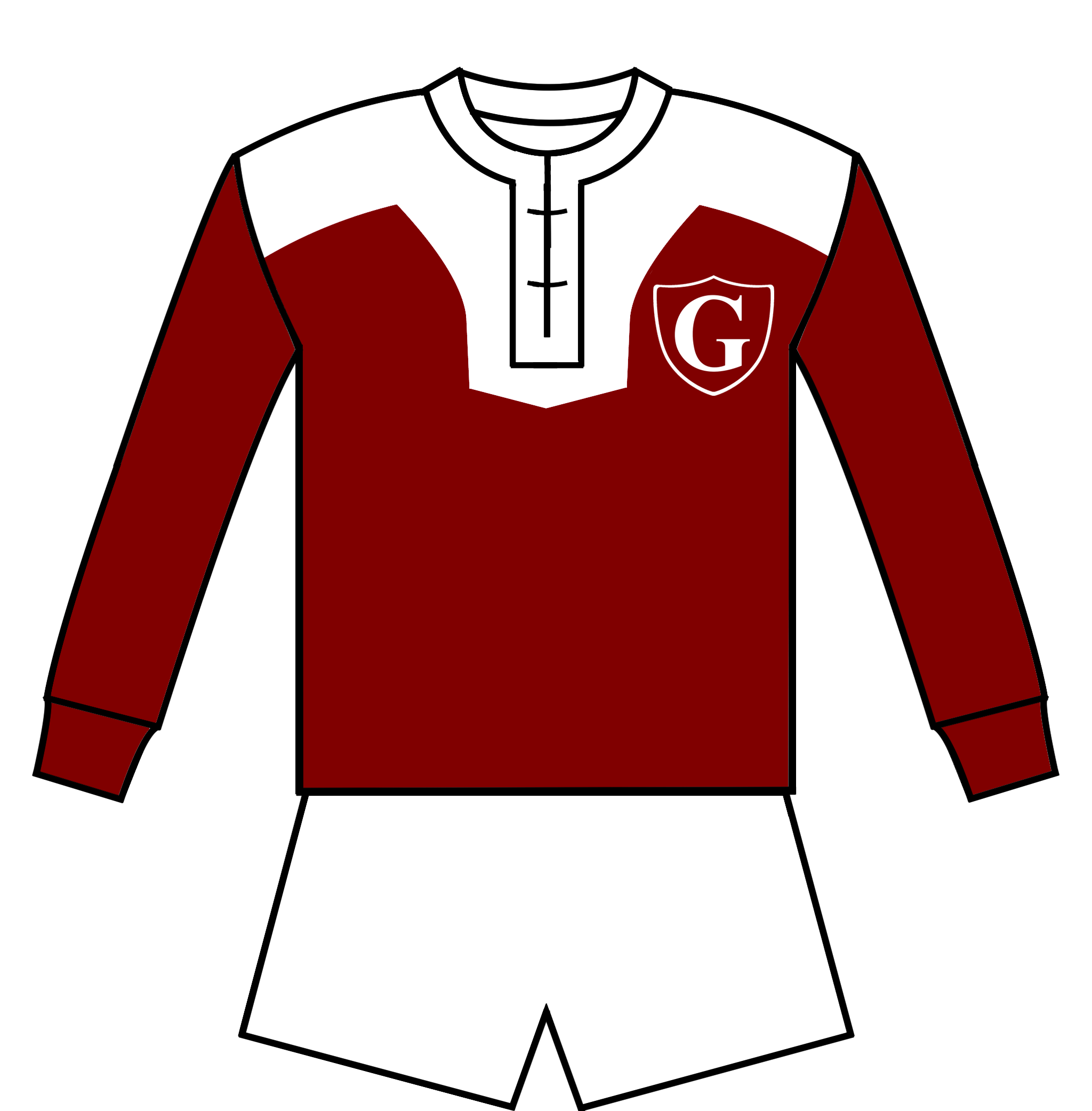
Glebe; 10th season Ground: Wentworth Park; Coaches: Chris McKivat & Alex Burdon; Captain: Frank Burge

Newtown; 10th season Ground: Erskineville Oval; Coach: Captain: Felix Ryan

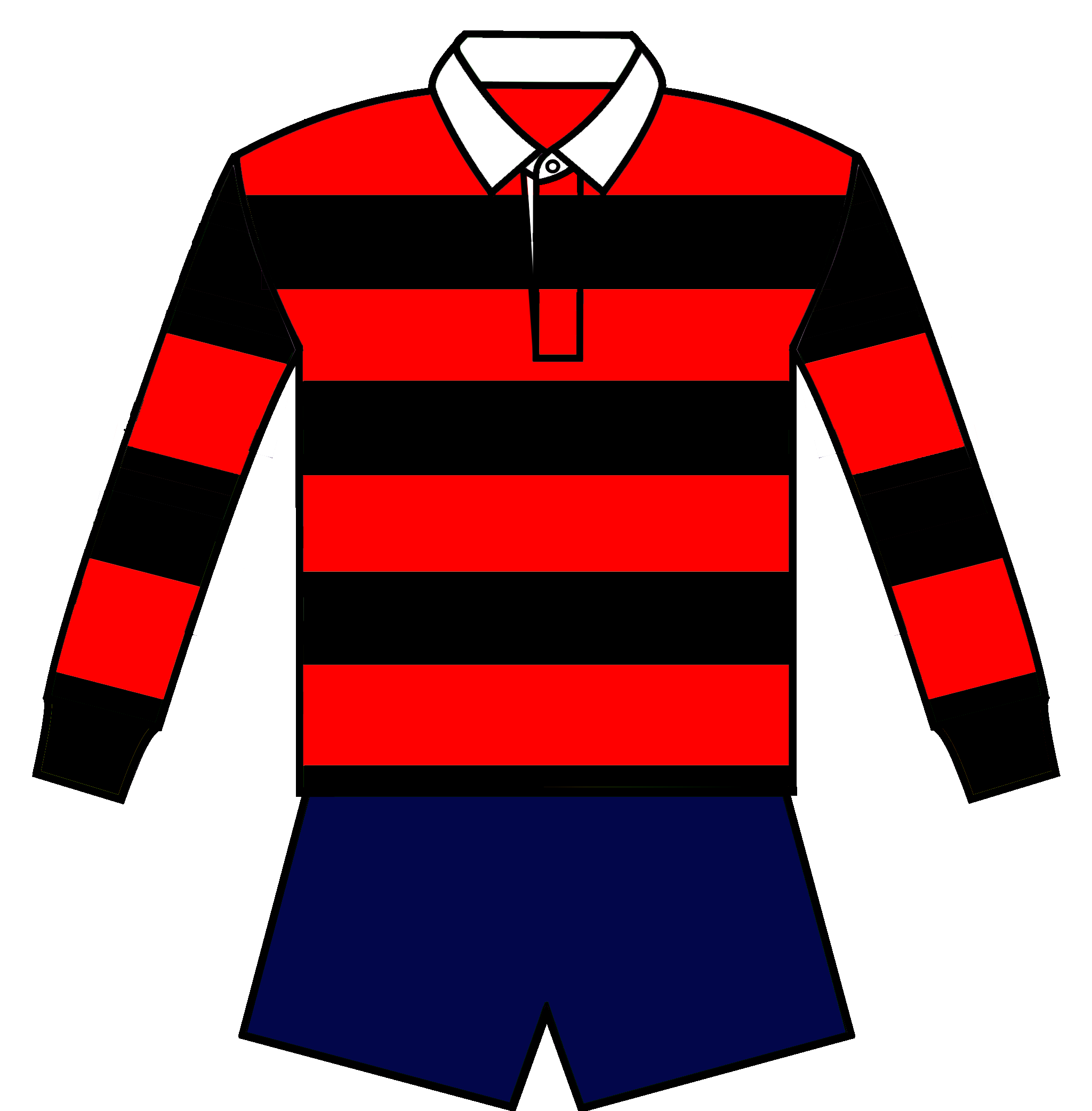
North Sydney; 10th season Ground: North Sydney Oval; Coach: Captain: Sid Deane

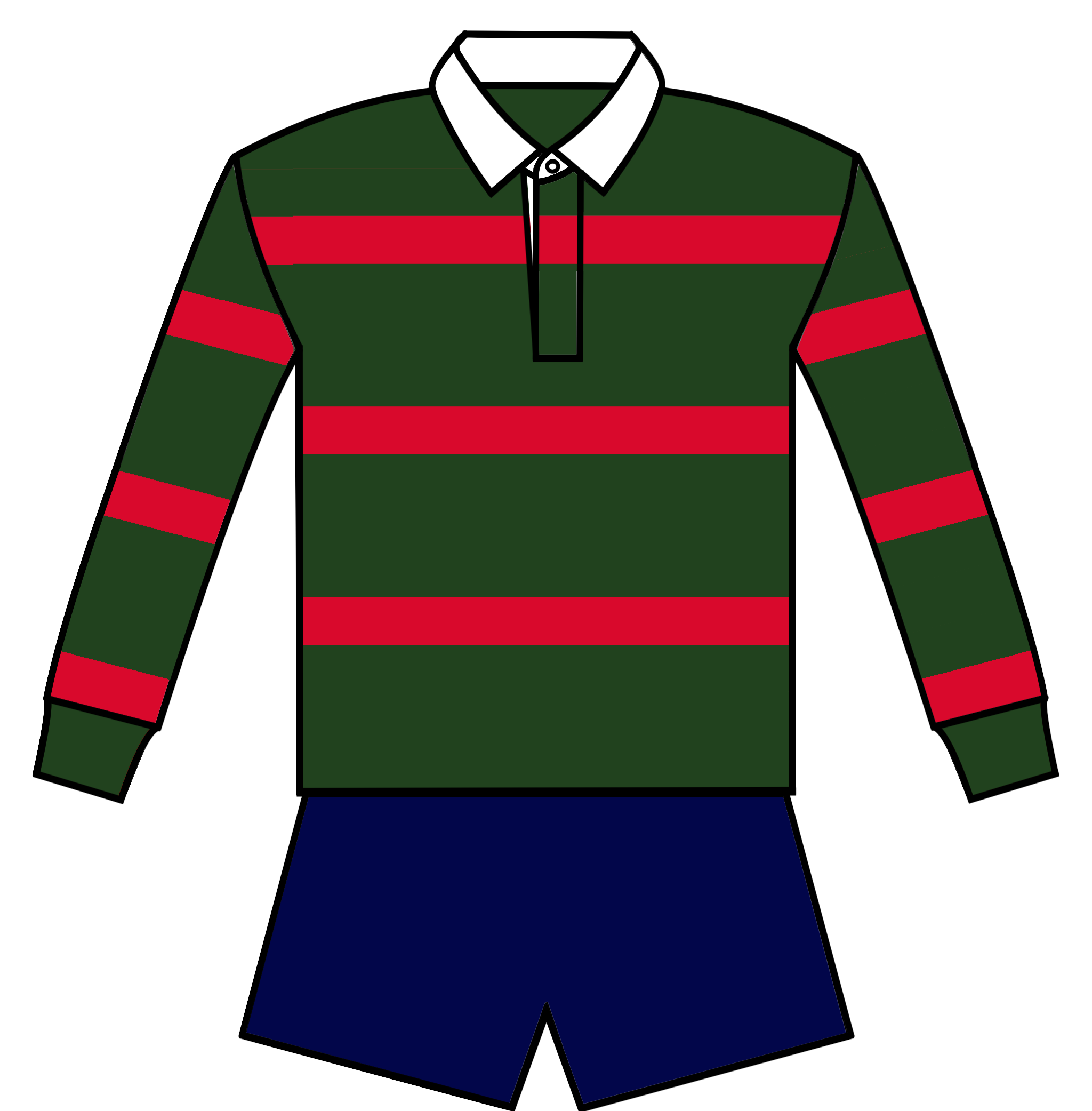
South Sydney; 10th season Ground: RAS Showground, S.C.G. Coach: Captain: Roy Almond

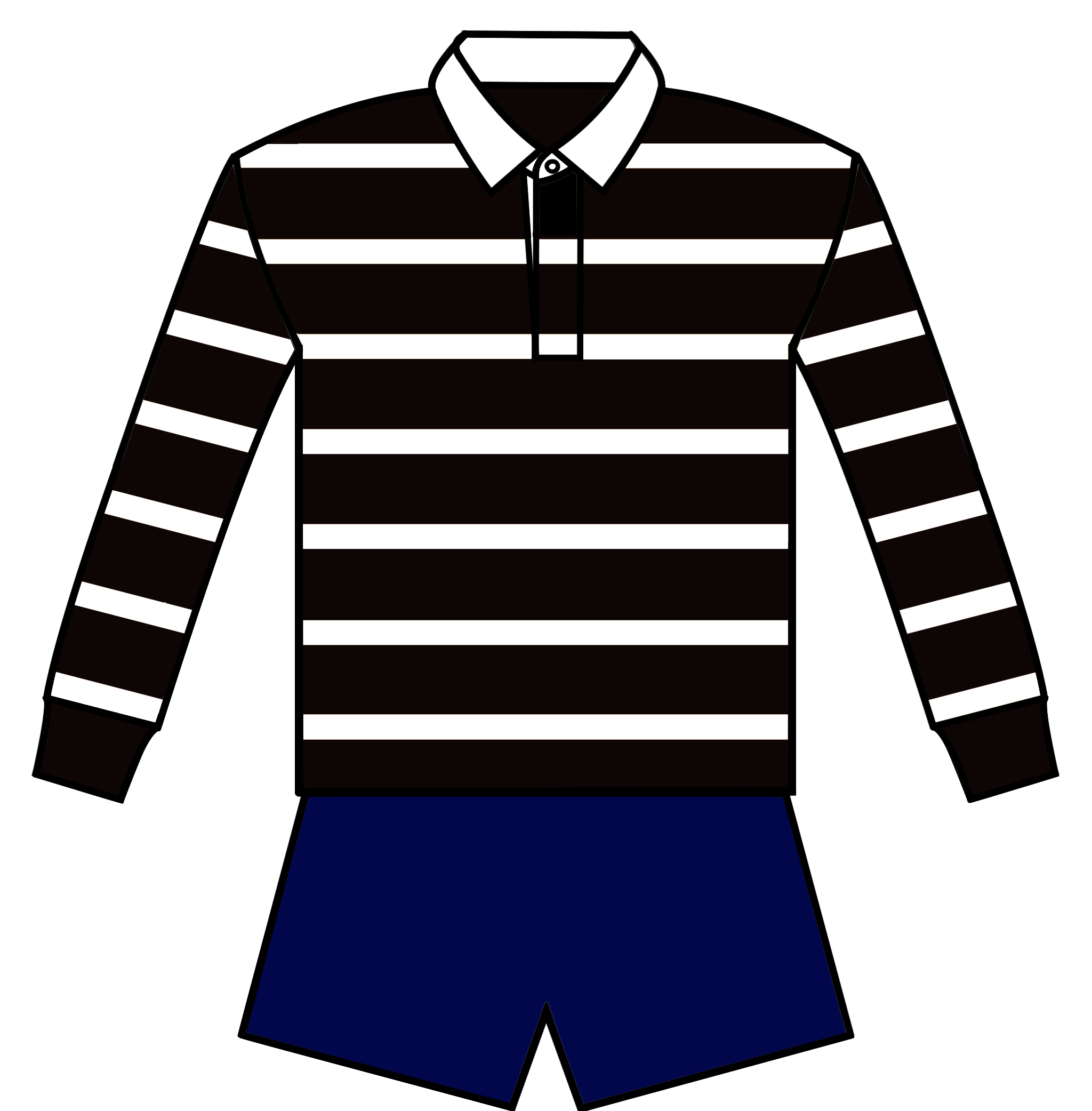
Western Suburbs; 10th season Ground: St Luke's Oval; Coach: Captain: Herb Gilbert

=== Ladder ===
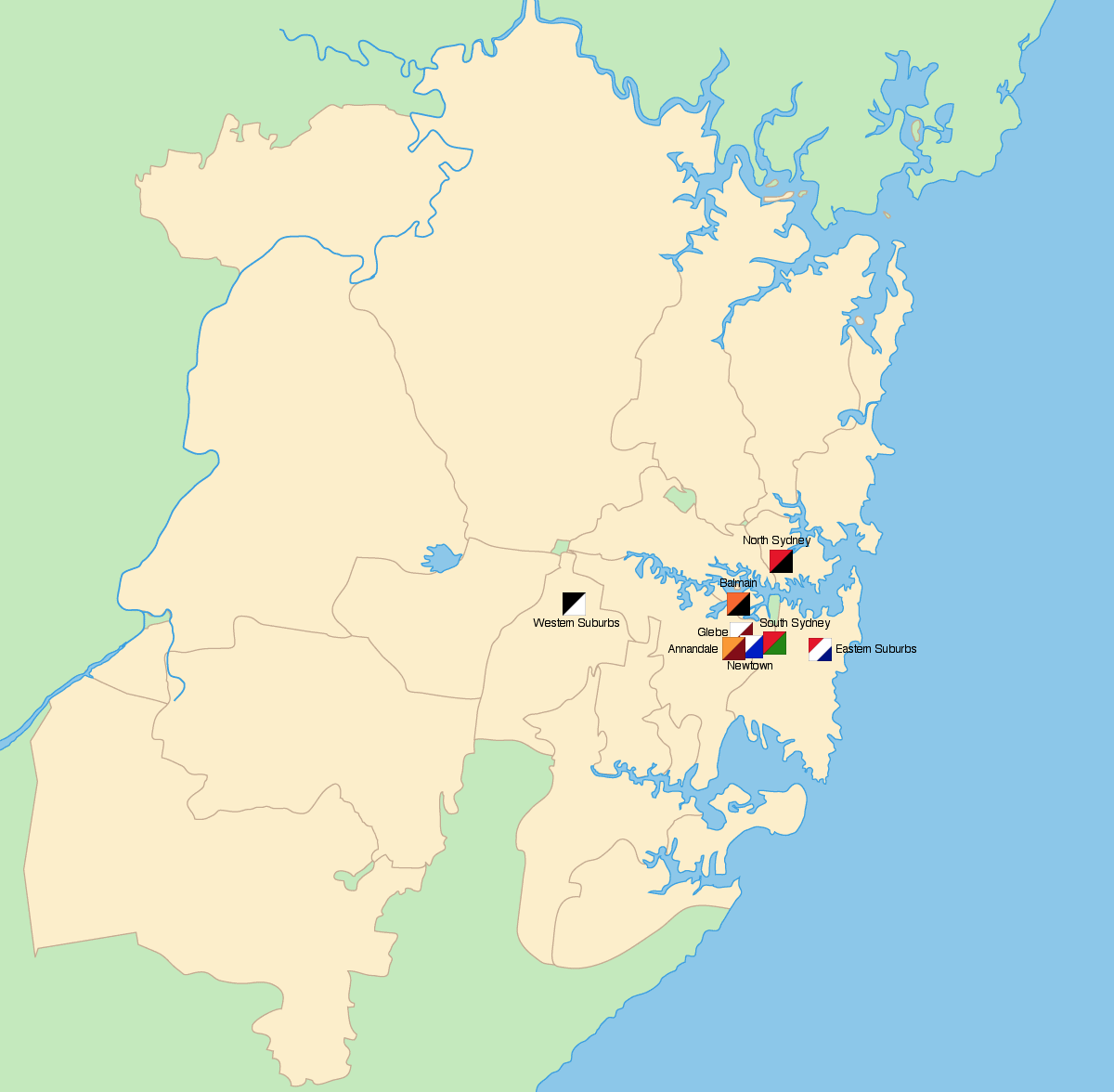
The geographical locations of the teams that contested the 1917 premiership across Sydney.

	Team	Pld	W	D	L	PF	PA	PD	Pts
1	Balmain	14	13	0	1	269	61	+208	26
2	South Sydney	14	9	0	5	236	143	+93	18
3	Western Suburbs	14	7	1	6	162	160	+2	15
4	Newtown	14	7	1	6	114	123	-9	15
5	Glebe	14	8	0	6	207	165	+42	14
6	Eastern Suburbs	14	7	0	7	131	145	-14	14
7	Annandale	14	1	2	11	71	214	-143	4
8	North Sydney	14	2	0	12	90	269	-179	4

- Glebe were stripped of two competition points due to fielding an ineligible player in one game.
