= 1915 NSWRFL season =

Rugby league competition

1915 New South Wales Rugby Football League
- Teams: 8
- Premiers: Balmain (1st title)
- Minor premiers: Balmain (1st title)
- Matches played: 56
- Points scored: 1308
- Top points scorer(s): Wally Messenger (73)
- Wooden spoon: North Sydney (1st spoon)
- Top try-scorer(s): Frank Burge (20)

The 1915 New South Wales Rugby Football League premiership was the eighth season of Sydney’s top-grade rugby league football club competition, Australia’s first. Eight teams from across the city contested during the season, with the Balmain club finishing on top of the ladder to claim the premiership.

== Season summary ==
Even though World War I had broken out across Europe and many players were unavailable, there was a general consensus amongst the public that the rugby league premiership continue. On 8 May in good weather the first matches were played between the eventual top four clubs: In front of a record crowd of 13,000 Glebe defeated defending premiers Easts at the SCG, and at Wentworth Oval Balmain drew 11–all with Newtown. Midway through the season, three clubs had clearly broken ahead of the others: Balmain, Glebe and South Sydney. With South Sydney falling away in the second half of the season, Balmain and Glebe became the two remaining contenders for the title, and they clashed with four rounds to play. In front of 20,000 people, the two clubs played out a memorable match at the Sydney Sports Ground, where Balmain eventually prevailed 12–2 on a cold, rainy day. Balmain were assured their first premiership without the need for a playoff after their close last-round win over South Sydney 7–4.

Balmain went through 1915 undefeated – a feat achieved by only five other teams since. They won the premiership in all three grades. Members of the Balmain first-grade premiership winning side included Bob Craig, Bill Schultz and E. Burnicle.

In 1915, the NSWRFL lost its first ever full-time Secretary Edward Larkin when he was killed in fighting at Gallipoli on 25 April.

=== Teams ===
The teams remained unchanged from the 1914 season.

- Annandale
- Balmain, formed on 23 January 1908 at Balmain Town Hall
- Eastern Suburbs, formed on 24 January 1908 at Paddington Town Hall
- Glebe, formed on 9 January 1908
- Newtown, formed on 14 January 1908
- North Sydney, formed on February 7, 1908, at the North Sydney School of Arts in Mount Street
- South Sydney, formed on 17 January 1908 at Redfern Town Hall
- Western Suburbs, formed on 4 February 1908

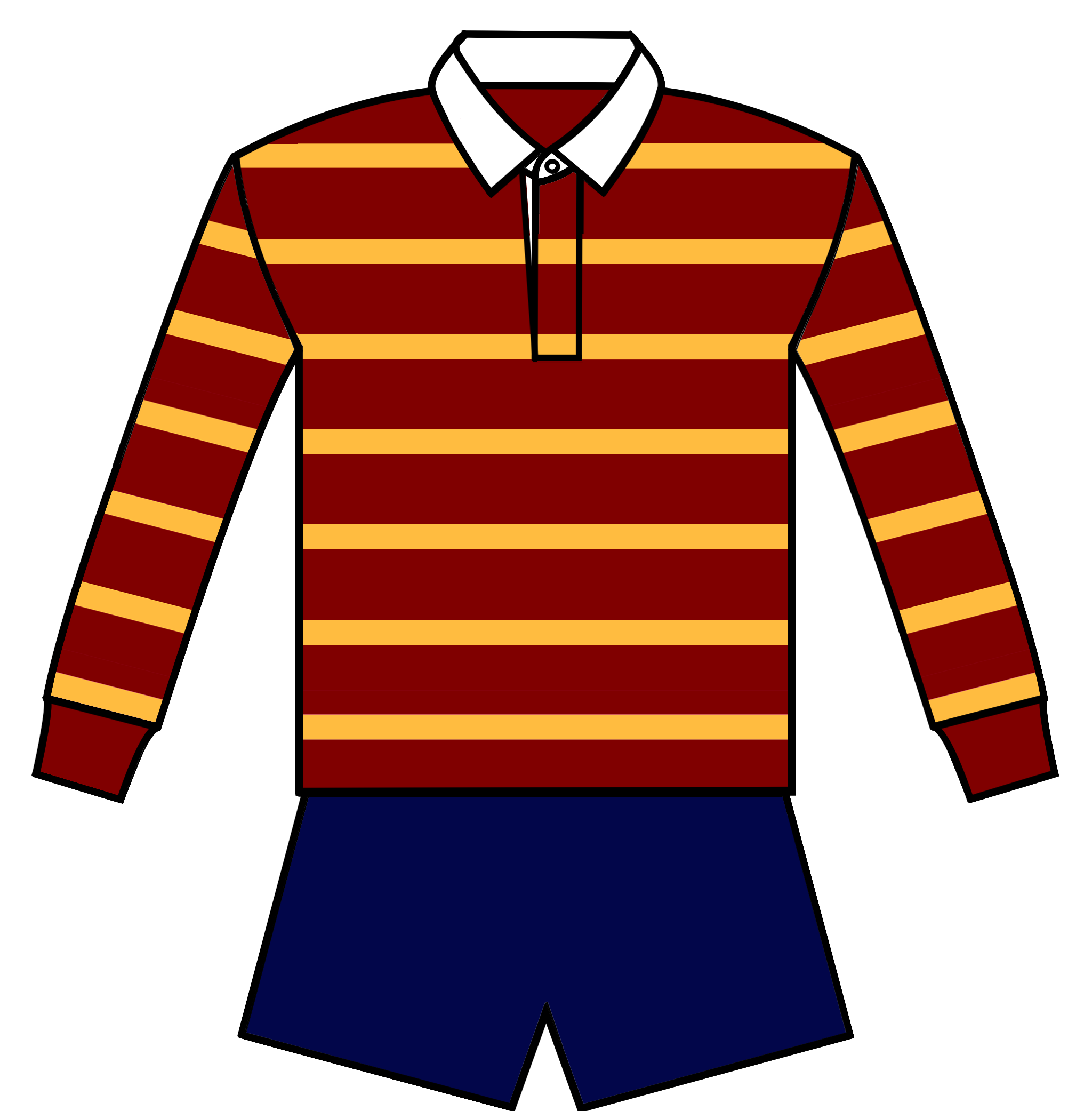
Annandale; 6th season Ground: Wentworth Park; Coach: Captain: Robert Stuart

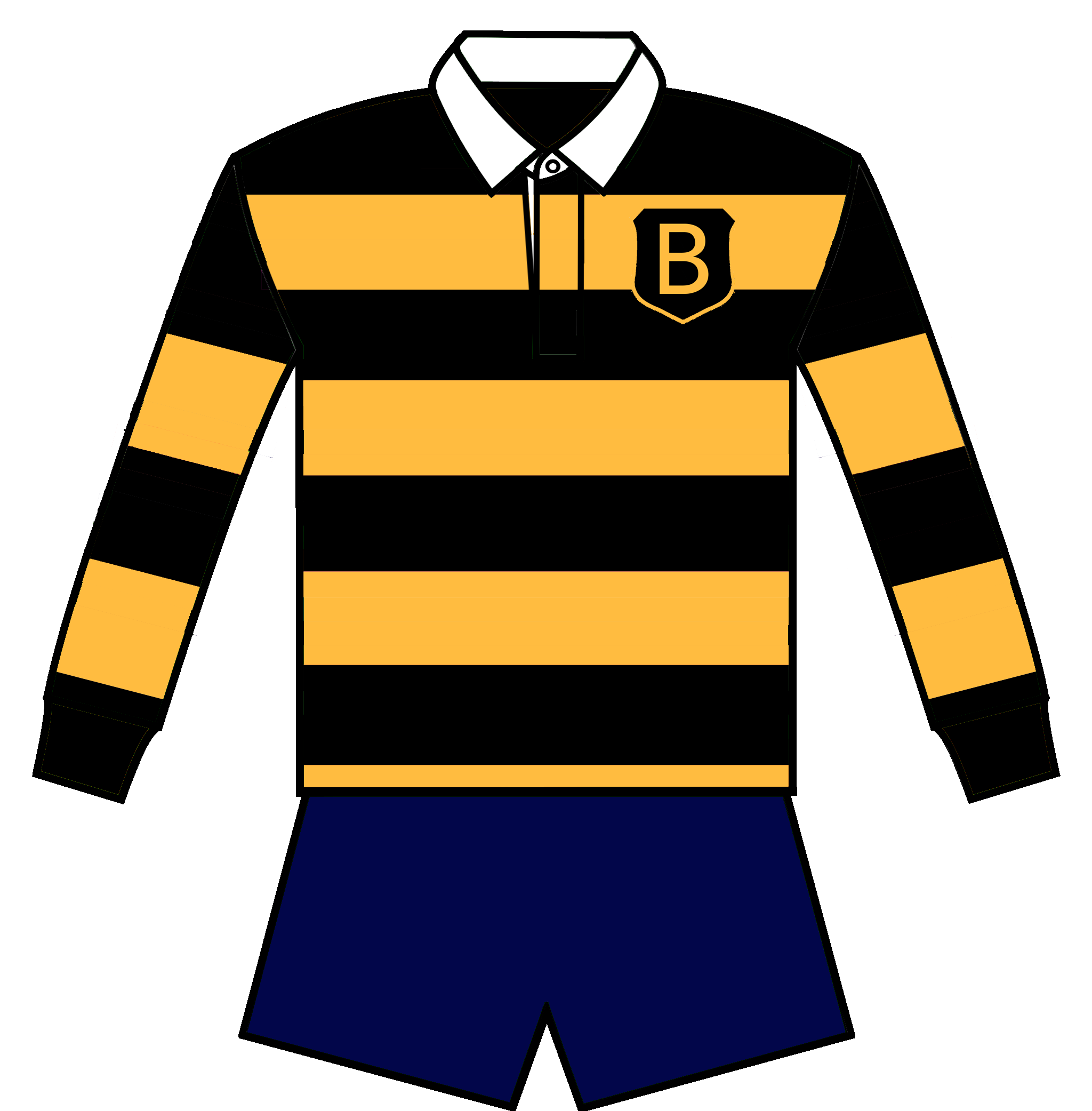
Balmain; 8th season Ground: Birchgrove Oval; Captain-coach: Bill Kelly

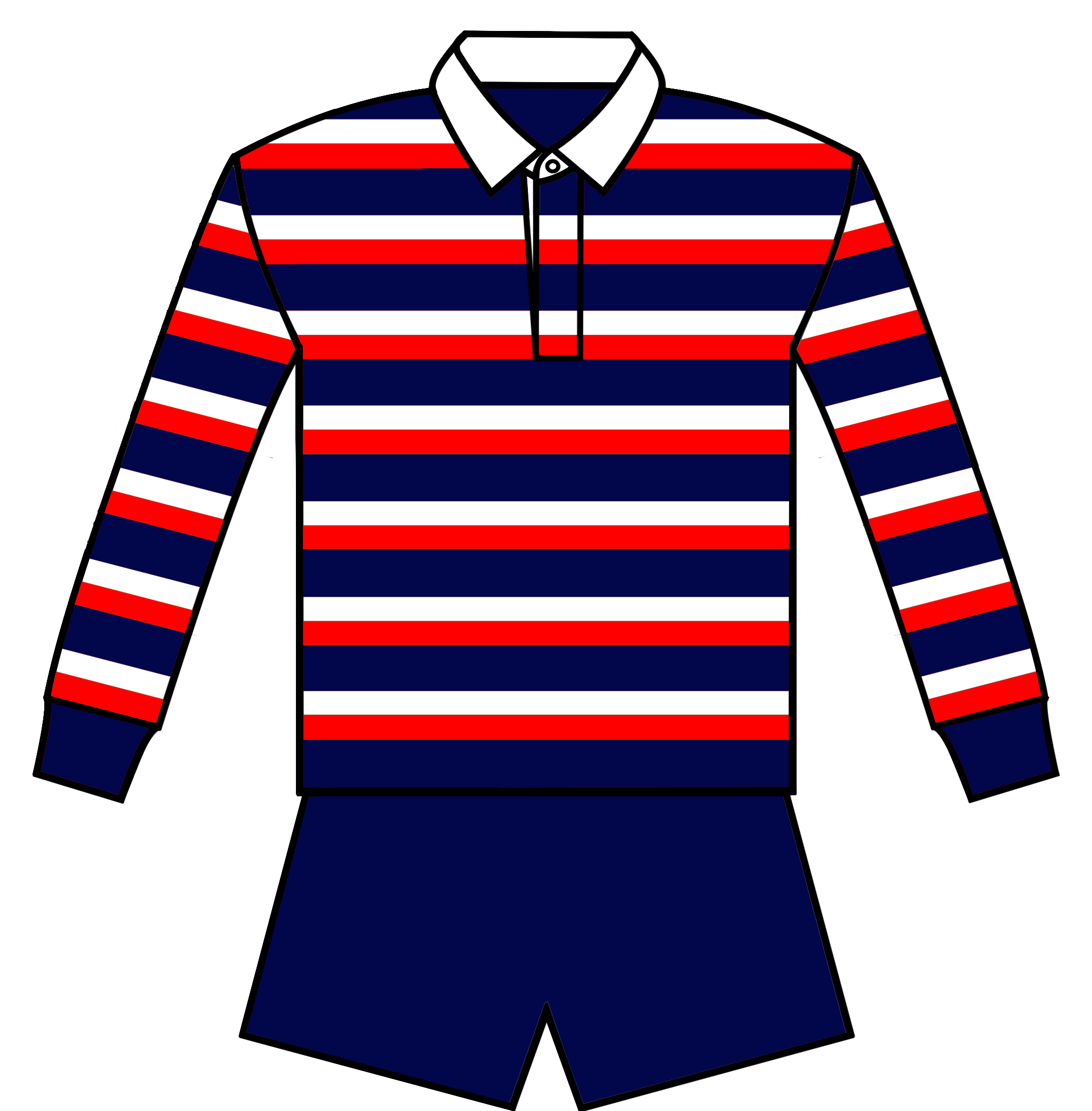
Eastern Suburbs; 8th season Ground: Sydney Sports Ground; Coach: Captain: Sandy Pearce

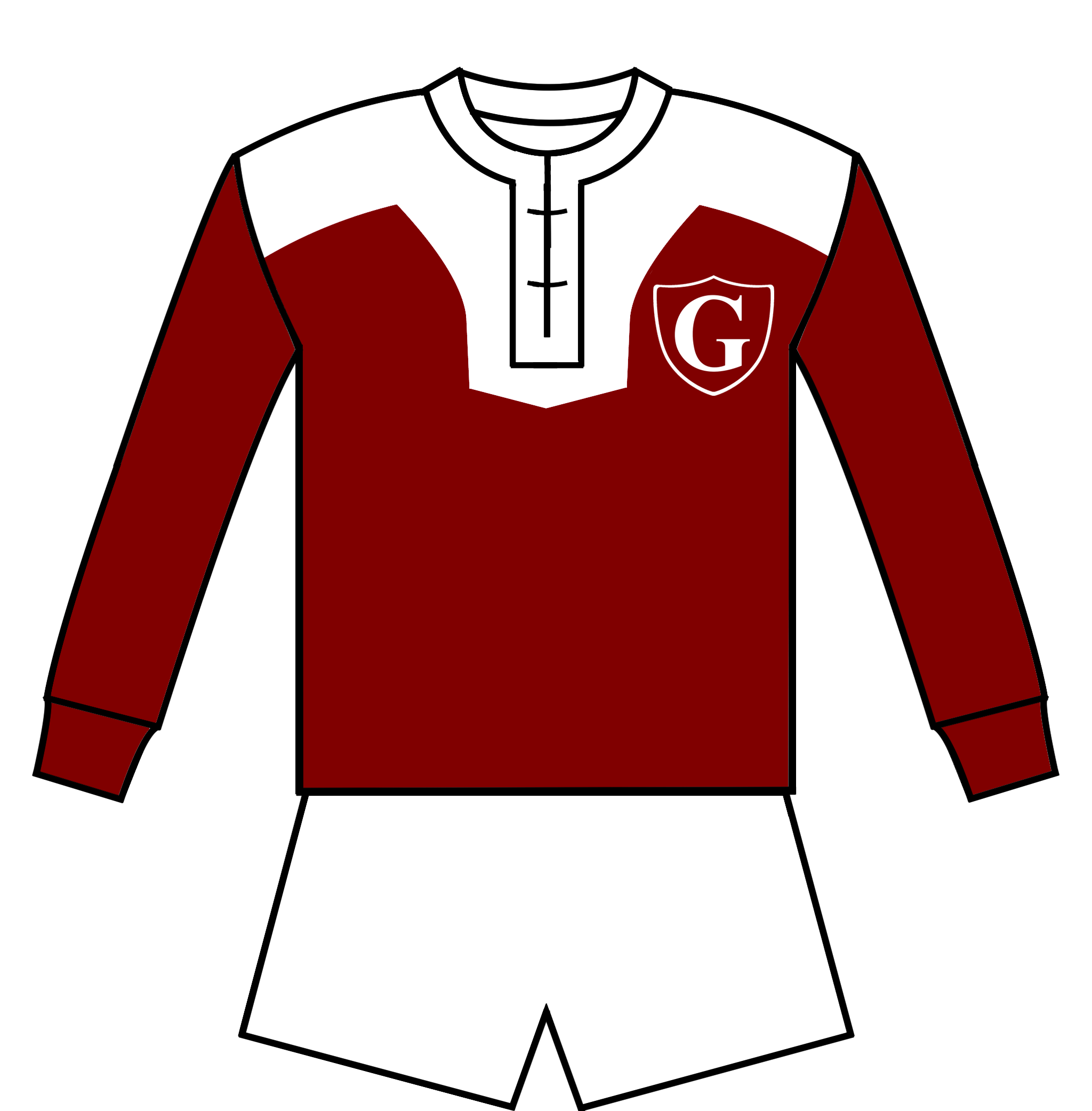
Glebe; 8th season Ground: Wentworth Park; Coach: Captain: Frank Burge

Newtown; 8th season Ground: Erskineville Oval, Sydney; Coach: Captain: Paddy McCue

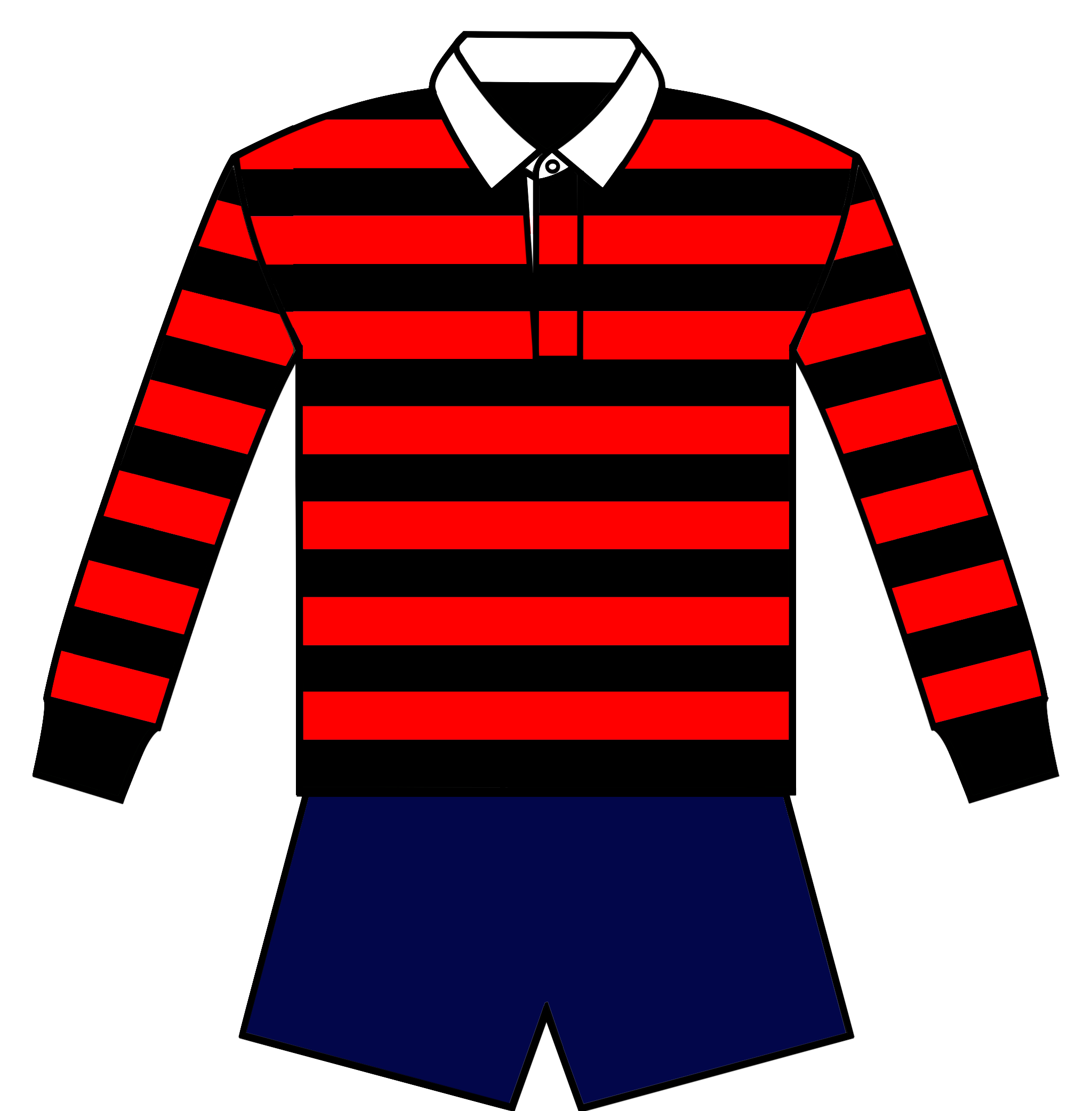
North Sydney; 8th season Ground: North Sydney Oval; Coach: Denis Lutge; Captain: Con Sullivan

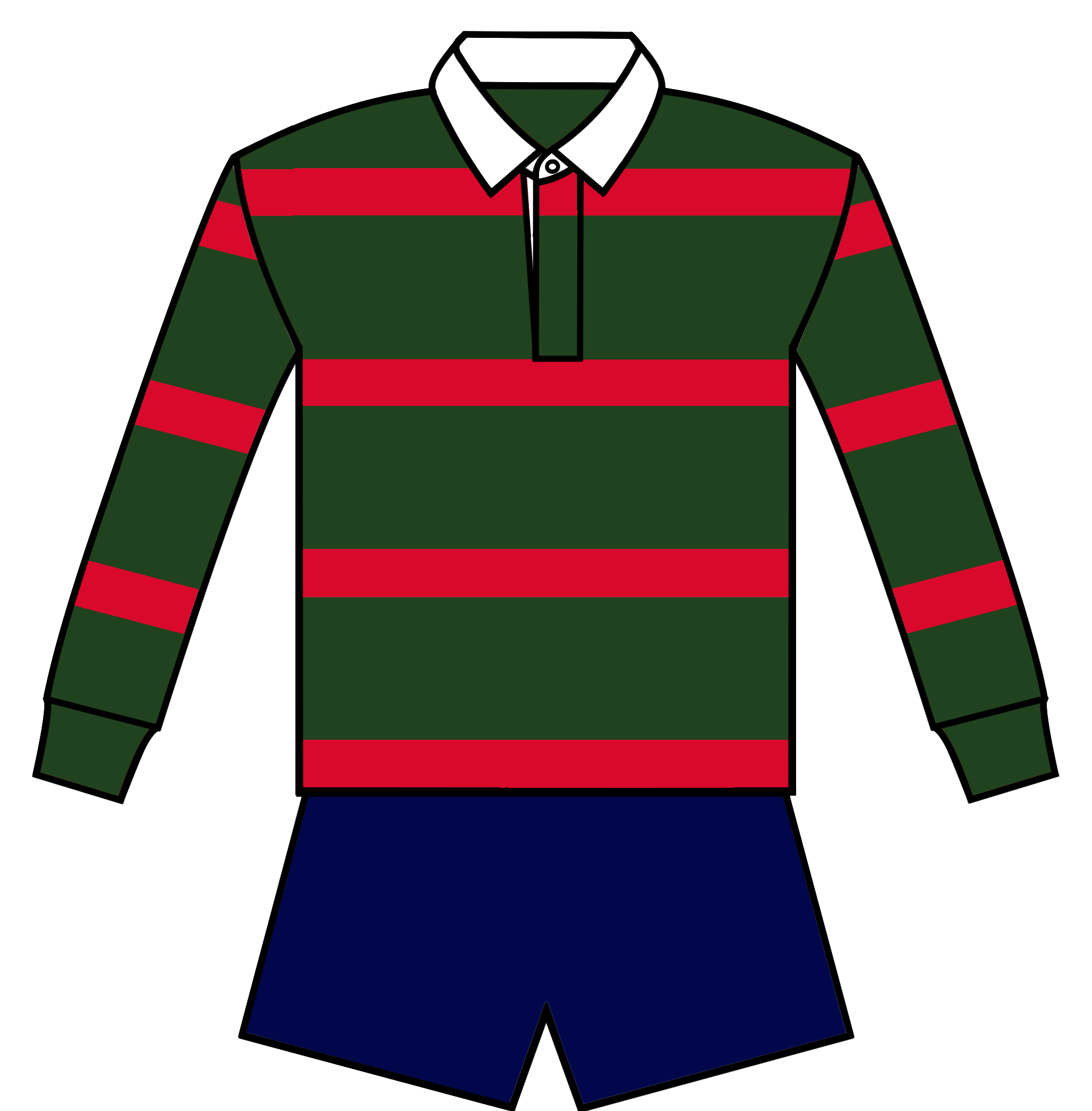
South Sydney; 8th season Ground: RAS Showground; Coach: Arthur Hennessy; Captain: Arthur Butler

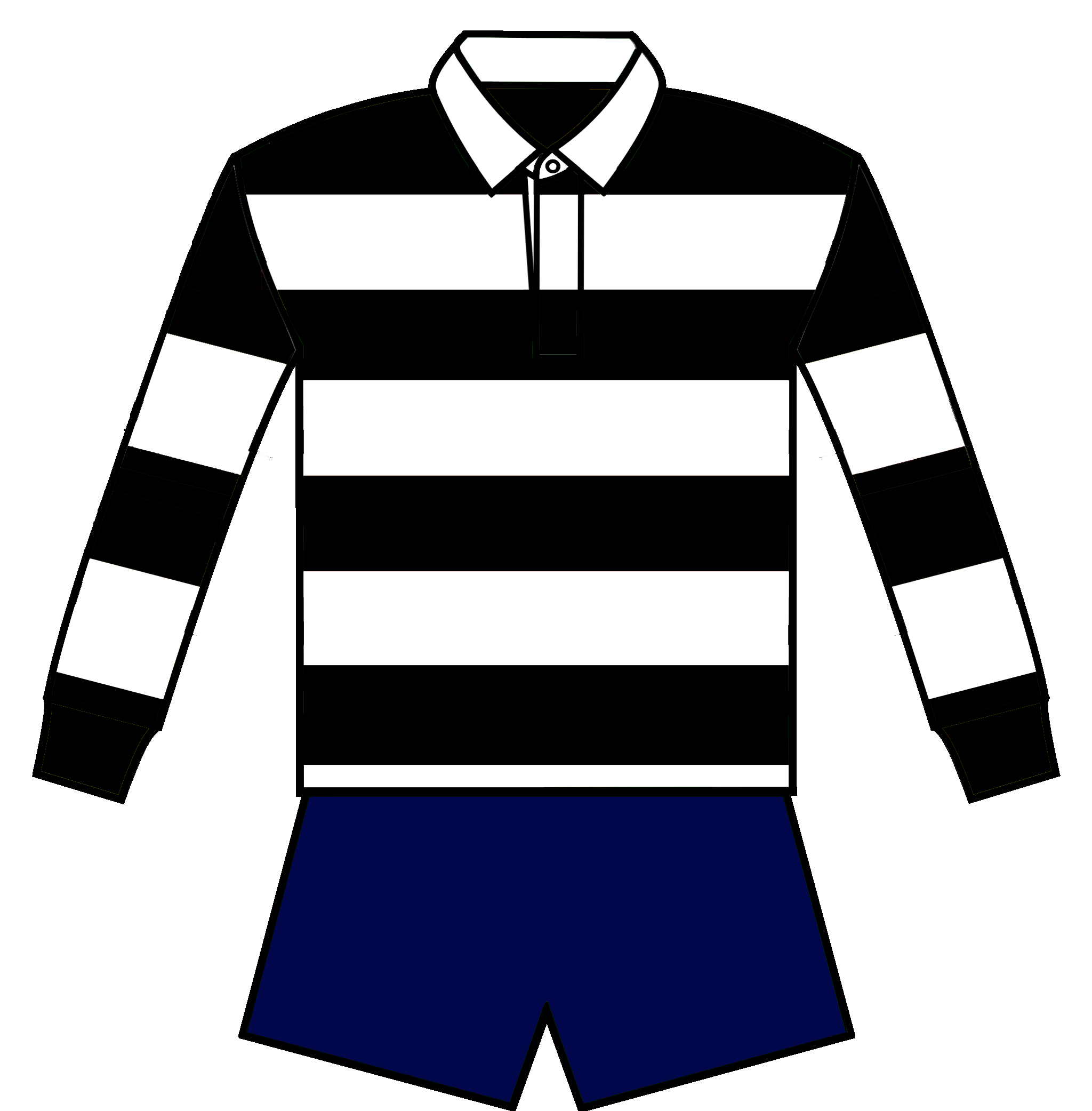
Western Suburbs; 8th season Ground: St Lukes Oval; Coach: Captain: Tedda Courtney

=== Ladder ===
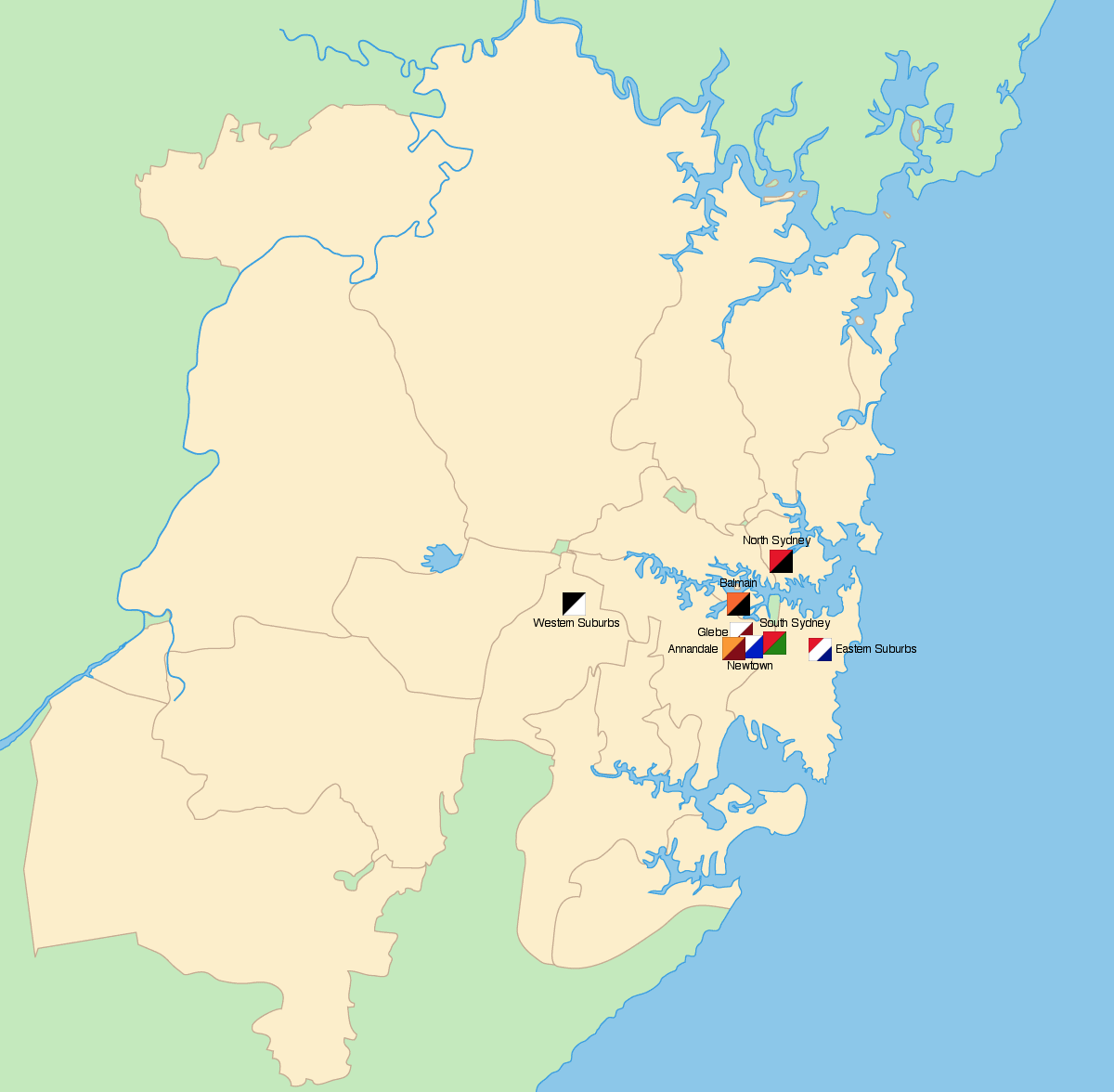
The geographical locations of the teams that contested the 1915 premiership across Sydney.

	Team	Pld	W	D	L	PF	PA	PD	Pts
1	Balmain	14	12	2	0	232	71	+161	26
2	Glebe	14	12	0	2	268	106	+162	24
3	Newtown	14	9	1	4	208	119	+89	19
4	South Sydney	14	8	1	5	157	94	+63	17
5	Eastern Suburbs	14	6	0	8	180	109	+71	12
6	Annandale	14	3	0	11	113	256	-143	6
7	Western Suburbs	14	2	0	12	67	200	-133	4
8	North Sydney	14	2	0	12	83	353	-270	4
