= English county histories =

English county histories, in other words historical and topographical (or "chorographical") works concerned with individual ancient counties of England, were produced by antiquarians from the late 16th century onwards. The content was variable: most focused on recording the ownership of estates and the descent of lordships of manors, thus the genealogies of county families, heraldry and other antiquarian material. In the introduction to one typical early work of this style, The Antiquities of Warwickshire published in 1656, the author William Dugdale writes:

I offer unto you my noble countriemen, as the most proper persons to whom it can be presented wherein you will see very much of your worthy ancestors, to whose memory I have erected it as a monumentall pillar and to shew in what honour they lived in those flourishing ages past. In this kind, or not much different, have divers persons in forrein parts very learnedly written; some whereof I have noted in my preface: and I could wish that there were more that would adventure in the like manner for the rest of the counties of this nation, considering how acceptable those are, which others have already performed

Thus his work was designed primarily to be read by his fellow county gentry of Warwickshire, whose public lives and marriages were largely confined within their own county of residence, which they administered as Justices of the Peace and Sheriffs, and represented in Parliament. The genealogical and heraldic tradition continues with the series of Victoria County Histories commenced in the late 19th century.

Other forms recorded archaeological sites. A closely related genre, which emerged in the second half of the 17th century, was the county "Natural History", which focused on the county's flora, fauna and natural phenomena, but which also often included chapters on antiquities. The best known examples were Robert Plot's two volumes on Oxfordshire (1677) and Staffordshire (1686); and John Aubrey's unpublished work on Wiltshire.

== Development ==
=== Continental models ===
Dugdale quotes as his foreign models César de Nostredame (1553–1629), historian of Provence in France, author of Rerum antiquarum et nobiliorum Provinciae, written c.1560, published 1615; Ottavio Rossi, historian of Brescia in Italy, author of Memorie Bresciane, Opera Historica, E Simbolica (1626); Guillaume Catel (1560–1626), historian of Languedoc in France, author of Mémoires sur l'histoire du Languedoc (1633); Samuel Guichenon (1607–1664), historian of Bresse in France, author of Histoire de la Bresse et du Bugey (1650) and Antonius Sanderus (1586–1664), historian of Flanders, author of Flandria Illustrata (1641).

=== English pioneers ===
William Lambarde's Perambulation of Kent (completed 1570; published 1576) is generally acknowledged as the first example of the genre in England. It was followed by Richard Carew's Survey of Cornwall (1602), and William Burton's Description of Leicester Shire (1622), as well as a number of other projects (such as those of Sir William Pole, Thomas Westcote, and Tristram Risdon in Devon, and Sampson Erdeswicke in Staffordshire) which, although they sometimes circulated in manuscript, did not come to completion or publication. Following the appearance of William Dugdale's Antiquities of Warwickshire (1656), a pattern was set. In the nineteenth century John Bowyer Nichols followed the line of a history of Leicestershire compiled by his father John Nichols, and saw numerous county histories through the press at his printing firm. The scope of county histories varied, but the titles became quite standard: "Antiquities of", "Worthies of", "Geological survey", "Description of", later "Directory of", all could indicate the intention of producing a "history", a term that only in later times acquired the narrower meaning it carries today. Chorography, topography and toponymy might all be involved. Materials and collections for their counties were made by antiquaries, but publication might await sponsorship or enough subscriptions, as well as a capable author who would make a readable book, perhaps of multiple volumes, from notes.

== Listing by county ==
=== Bedfordshire ===
See: History of Bedfordshire; Category: History of Bedfordshire;

- Magna Britannia (1806)
- Victoria County History three volumes, 1904–1912

=== Berkshire ===
- Elias Ashmole, Antiquities of Berkshire (1719)
- J. Rocque, A Topographical Survey of the County of Berkshire, 1761

=== Buckinghamshire ===
See: History of Buckinghamshire; Category: History of Buckinghamshire; Victoria County History edited by William Page

- George Lipscomb, The History and Antiquities of the County of Buckingham published in eight parts, 1831–47
- James Joseph Sheahan, History and Topography of Buckinghamshire: comprising a general survey of the county, preceded by an epitome of the early history of Great Britain (1862)

=== Cambridgeshire ===
- Edmund Carter, History of the County of Cambridge (1753)

=== Cheshire ===
- Sir Peter Leycester, 1st Baronet, Historical antiquities (1673)
- Peter Perez Burdett, Survey of the County Palatine of Chester (1772)
- George Ormerod, The History of the County Palatine and City of Chester (1816–19)

=== Cornwall ===
- Richard Carew, The Survey of Cornwall (1602)
- William Hals, Compleat History of Cornwall, from about 1750
- An historical survey of the county of Cornwall, etc., compiled by William Penaluna
- Richard Polwhele, The History of Cornwall (7 vols. 1803–08, revised 1816)
- Daniel Lysons and Samuel Lysons, Magna Britannia

The Cornwall history was supported by Francis Vyvyan Jago Arundell.

- Charles Sandoe Gilbert, Historical Survey of the County of Cornwall (2 vols., 1817–20)
- Fortescue Hitchins and Samuel Drew, The History of Cornwall (1824)

=== Cumberland and Westmorland ===
- Richard Burn and Joseph Nicolson, The History and Antiquities of the Counties of Westmorland and Cumberland, 1777.

This goes back to the manuscript Accompt of the most considerable estates and families in the county of Cumberland of about 1603 by John Denton. Through copies made by Daniel Fleming, it used material collected by Christopher Rawlinson. Joseph Nicolson (born 1706, baptised William – 1777), son of John Nicolson of Hawkesdale, was a nephew of Bishop William Nicolson, and inherited from him collections relating to Carlisle. Burn and Nicolson used in particular material collected by Thomas Machell, vicar of Kirkby Thore, and collated by William Nicolson.

- William Hutchinson, History of the County of Cumberland (1794).

=== Derbyshire ===
- Stephen Glover, Directory of the County of Derby (1827–29); and History of the County of Derby (1829–31)

Glover made use of, and expanded, an unpublished history by William Woolley.

- Samuel Bagshaw, History, Gazetteer and Directory of Derbyshire (1846)
- White, History, Gazetteer and Directory of the County of Derby (1857)

=== Devon ===
- John Hooker, Synopsis Corographical of the County of Devon (c. 1587), unpublished
- Sir William Pole (d. 1635), Collections Towards a Description of the County of Devon, notes made (c. 1608–1617), published by Sir John-William de la Pole (ed.), London, 1791
- Thomas Westcote, Survey of Devon of 1630
- Tristram Risdon, Chorographical Description or Survey of the County of Devon (c. 1632)
- Richard Polwhele, The History of Devonshire (1793–1806)

John Swete supplied material to Polwhele.

- William White, History, Gazetteer and Directory of the County of Devon: including the city of Exeter, and comprising a general survey of the county

=== Dorset ===
- John Hutchins, History and Antiquities of Dorset (1774)
- John Hutchins, The History and Antiquities of the County of Dorset, Vols. 1–4, 1815.

=== Durham ===
- William Hutchinson, History and Antiquities of the Country Palatine of Durham
- Robert Surtees, The History and Antiquities of the County Palatine of Durham

Both Hutchinson and Surtees drew on the work of George Allan. John Brewster assisted Surtees.

- James Raine, The History and Antiquities of North-Durham, 1852
- William Fordyce, The History and Antiquities of the County Palatine of Durham
- Whellan, History, Topography, and Directory of the County Palatine of Durham (1856)

=== Essex ===
- Philip Morant, The History and Antiquities of the County of Essex, two volumes 1763–1768

Morant used collections of Thomas Jekyll; and also material from Richard Symonds he obtained via Gregory King. A major source was the parish descriptions of William Holman. These had been acquired by Nicholas Tindal, for whom Morant worked as a curate; Tindal made a small start on publishing Essex history, around 1732. They then passed via Nathaniel Salmon, Anthony Allen and John Booth, before Morant had them from Booth about 1750.

- A New and Complete History of Essex, from a late survey (1772)
- Elizabeth Ogborne, The History of Essex (1817, one volume only)

Thomas Leman and probably Joseph Strutt assisted.

- William White, History, Gazetteer and Directory of the County of Essex, 1848

=== Gloucestershire ===
- Sir Robert Atkyns, The Ancient and Present State of Glostershire (1712)
- Samuel Rudder, A New History of Gloucestershire (1779)

Rudder's work was based on Atkyns and a manuscript of Richard Furney.

- Ralph Bigland, Historical, Monumental & Genealogical Collections relative to the County of Gloucester (1791–94)
- Thomas Rudge, The History of the County of Gloucester, compressed and brought down to the year 1803 (1803)
- Thomas Dudley Fosbroke, Abstracts of Records and Manuscripts Respecting the County of Gloucester (1807)
- Gloucestershire Victoria County History

=== Hampshire ===
- William Bingley, The Topographical Account of the Hundred of Bosmere (fragment) 1817
- William White, History, gazetteer and directory of the County of Hampshire (1859; 2nd edition 1878)

=== Herefordshire ===
- John Duncumb, partial work (1804–12) continued by others.

Duncumb used work by Richard Blyke; and an older manuscript by Silas Taylor (Domville).

=== Hertfordshire ===
See: History of Hertfordshire; Category:History of Hertfordshire; Victoria County History

- John Norden, Speculi Britaniae Pars: the Description of Hartfordshire (1598)
- Henry Chauncy, Antiquities of Hertfordshire (1700)
- Nathaniel Salmon, History of Hertfordshire (1728)

Salmon drew on unpublished material of Chauncy.

- Robert Clutterbuck, The History and Antiquities of the County of Hertford (1815–27)

Clutterbuck used collections of Thomas Blore.

- John Edwin Cussans, A History of Hertfordshire, containing an account of the Descents of the various Manors, Pedigrees of Families, Antiquities, Local Customs, &c. (16 parts in three folio volumes, 1870–81)

=== Kent ===
- William Lambarde, A Perambulation of Kent (completed 1570; published 1576)
- Richard Kilburne, A Brief Survey of the County of Kent (1657) [a summary digest of parishes]; and A Topographie, or Survey of the County of Kent (1659)
- Thomas Philipot, Villare Cantianum: or Kent Surveyed and Illustrated (1659)

Philipot drew on materials originally collected by his father, John Philipot, and the Villare Cantianum is sometimes said to be John's work published under Thomas's name. He also drew on notes inherited from Robert Glover, his great-uncle.

- Edward Hasted, The History and Topographical Survey of the County of Kent, (1st edn, 4 folio vols, 1778–99); (2nd edn, 12 octavo vols, 1797–1801)
- Samuel Henshall, Specimens and parts; containing a history of the county of Kent and a dissertation on the laws (1798, partial)
- Christopher Greenwood, An Epitome of County History Vol. 1 (1818)

=== Lancashire ===
- Matthew Gregson, Portfolio of Fragments relative to the History and Antiquities of the County Palatine and Duchy of Lancaster (1817)
- John Corry, History of Lancashire (1825)
- Edward Baines, Directory and Gazetteer of the County of Lancaster (1824–25) and History of the County Palatine of Lancaster (1836).

Baines used Edwin Butterworth as researcher and author; he also took much from Gregson's Portfolio.

=== Leicestershire ===
- William Burton, The Description of Leicester Shire (1622)

Burton made use of notes of Augustine Vincent.

- John Nichols, The History and Antiquities of the County of Leicester. 4 vols. (1795–1815)

Nichols included unpublished material from William Burton, Francis Peck, and Richard Farmer.

- William White, History, Gazetteer and Directory of Leicestershire, 1863

=== Lincolnshire ===
- William Marrat, History of Lincolnshire (1814–16), incomplete
- Thomas Allen, A History of the County of Lincoln (1833–34)

=== Middlesex ===
- John Norden, Speculum Britanniae: the First Parte: an Historicall, & Chorographicall Discription of Middlesex (1593)

=== Norfolk ===
- Anonymous, The Chorography of Norfolk (c.1602: unpublished)
- Francis Blomefield, Topographical History of Norfolk (1739–45)

Blomefield used materials from Peter Le Neve and Thomas Martin of Palgrave. Charles Parkin worked to complete the history. Blomefield used material collected by Antony Norris, who later worked on completing and revising the history with John Fenn.

- Anonymous, History and Antiquities of the County of Norfolk (1781)

By Crouse and Booth of Norwich, this was largely copied from Blomefield.

- John Chambers, A General History of the County of Norfolk (1829)

=== Northamptonshire ===
- John Morton, The Natural History of Northamptonshire, with some account of the antiquities; to which is annexed a transcript of Domesday Book (1712)
- Peter Whalley, The History and Antiquities of Northamptonshire. Compiled from the manuscript collections of the late learned antiquary, John Bridges, Esq. (1762–1791)

This resulted from a project started by John Bridges, and took several generations to come to fruition.

- George Baker, History and Antiquities of the County of Northampton (1822–30)

=== Northumberland ===
- John Wallis, The Natural History and Antiquities of Northumberland, and so much of the County of Durham as lies between the rivers Tyne and Tweed, commonly called North Bishoprick (2 vols., 1769).
- Eneas Mackenzie, An Historical and Descriptive View of the County of Northumberland (1811, 2 vols. and revised 1825); and A Descriptive and Historical Account of the Town and County of Newcastle-upon-Tyne (1827, 2 vols.)
- John Hodgson, History of Northumberland (unfinished, from 1825)
- John Hodgson Hinde, A History of Northumberland (1858)
- History of the County of Northumberland (15 volumes 1893–1940). This was issued by the Northumberland County History Committee.

=== Nottinghamshire ===
- Robert Thoroton, Antiquities of Nottinghamshire, 1677
- John Throsby, Antiquities of Nottinghamshire, 1790

=== Oxfordshire ===
- Robert Plot, The Natural History of Oxford-shire (1677)

=== Rutland ===
- James Wright, The History and Antiquities of the County of Rutland (1684)
- Thomas Blore, History and Antiquities of the County of Rutland (1811, partial)

=== Shropshire ===
- Charles Hulbert, History of the County of Salop (1837)

This included an edition of the 1779 History and Antiquities of Shrewsbury by Thomas Phillips, which drew on the work of James Bowen and John Bowen.

- Thomas Farmer Dukes, Antiquities of Shropshire (1844)

Dukes used a manuscript of Edward Lloyd.

=== Somerset ===
- John Collinson (1791, 3 vols.) including survey by Edmund Rack
- Somerset Victoria County History

=== Staffordshire ===
- Sampson Erdeswicke, Survey of Staffordshire
- Robert Plot, The Natural History of Staffordshire (1686)
- Stebbing Shaw, History of Staffordshire (History and Antiquities of Staffordshire)
- William Pitt, A Topographical History of Staffordshire (1817)

=== Suffolk ===
- Anonymous, The Chorography of Suffolk (1602: unpublished)
- Robert Reyce, A Breviary of Suffolk (c.1618: unpublished)
- John Gage Rokewode, The History and Antiquities of Suffolk, 1838
- Alfred Suckling, The History and Antiquities of the County of Suffolk (1846)
- M. R. James, Suffolk and Norfolk: A Perambulation of the Two Counties with Notices of Their History and Their Ancient Buildings (1930)

=== Surrey ===
- John Aubrey, Perambulation of Surrey (written 1673–92); published by Richard Rawlinson as The Natural History and Antiquities of the County of Surrey (1718–19)
- Owen Manning and William Bray, The History and Antiquities of the County of Surrey (1804–14)
- Edward Wedlake Brayley with Gideon Algernon Mantell (geology), A Topographical History of Surrey (1841)

=== Sussex ===
- James Dallaway, History of the Western Division of Sussex (1815 to 1832), with Edmund Cartwright
- Thomas Walker Horsfield, The History, Antiquities and Topography of the County of Sussex (1835)
- John Russell Smith, Sussex archaeological collections illustrating the history and antiquities of the county, 1853

=== Warwickshire ===
- William Dugdale, The Antiquities of Warwickshire (1656)

Dugdale used notes from William Burton; and much material from Simon Archer.

=== Wiltshire ===
- John Aubrey, Antiquities of Wiltshire (written 1656–71; partially published 1862); and Naturall Historie of Wiltshire (written 1656–91; partially published 1847)
- Sir Richard Colt Hoare, The History of Modern Wiltshire (1822–44)
- Wiltshire Victoria County History
- Wiltshire Archaeological and Natural History Magazine

=== Worcestershire ===
- Treadway Russell Nash, History and Antiquities of the County of Worcester (1781)

Nash used collections of Charles Lyttelton, including older research of Thomas Habington. He also was aware of the work of Thomas Dingley.

=== Yorkshire ===
- Ralph Thoresby, using collections of John Hopkinson
- Memoirs Illustrative of the History and Antiquities of the County and City of York (1816)
- Joseph Hunter, South Yorkshire (a history of the Deanery of Doncaster) (1828–31)
- Edward Baines, History, Directory and Gazetteer of the County of York (1822–23)
- Thomas Allen, A New and Complete History of the County of York (1828–31)
- The Survey of the County of York, John de Kirkby, 1866

== Related histories ==
=== Worthies ===
- Thomas Fuller, Worthies of England
- John Prince, Worthies of Devon
- Hartley Coleridge, Worthies of Yorkshire and Lancashire (1836)
- Mark Antony Lower, Worthies of Sussex (1865)
- Cornelius Brown, Worthies of Notts
- Winnifrith Alfred, Men of Kent and Kentish men: biographical notices of 680 worthies of Kent
- Henry Lonsdale The Worthies of Cumberland (1867)
- George Atkinson, The Worthies of Westmorland
- Browne, Edith Ophelia; Burton, John Richard (editors). A short biography of the Worthies of Worcestershire

=== Urban and parish histories ===
Histories were also written of cities, ancient boroughs, newer municipalities, and even individual parishes (parochial histories).

- John Stow, The Survey of London (1598 and 1603)
- Francis Drake, Eboracum: The History and Antiquities of the City of York, from its Original to the Present Time; together with the History of the Cathedral Church and the Lives of the Archbishops (1736)
- W. Newton, The History and Antiquities of Maidstone (1741)
- Philip Morant, The History and Antiquities of Colchester (1748)
- Thomas Warton, The History and Antiquities of Kiddington (1782)
- William Barrett, History and Antiquities of Bristol (1788)
- John Throsby, The History and Antiquities of the Ancient Town of Leicester (1791)
- John Brewster, Parochial History and Antiquities of Stockton-on-Tees (1796)
- John Blackner, History of Nottingham (1815)
- Thomas Walker Horsfield, The History and Antiquities of Lewes (1824–26)
- James Thompson, History of Leicester (1849–71)
- Pishey Thompson, The History and Antiquities of Boston (1856)
- Richard Vickerman Taylor, The Biographia Leodiensis; or, Biographical Sketches of the Worthies of Leeds and neighbourhood, from the Norman Conquest to the present time, etc.(1865–67)
- Howard Dudley, The History and Antiquities of Horsham
- Thomas Faulkner, History and Antiquities of Hammersmith

== See also ==
- Chorography
- English local history
- General View of Agriculture county surveys
- Popular County Histories book series
- Alan Ball Local History Awards

== Bibliography ==
- Black, S. B. (2001). A Scholar and a Gentleman: Edward Hasted, the historian of Kent. Otford: Darenth Valley Publications. ISBN 0-9507334-8-2.
- Blatchly, John (1988). The Topographers of Suffolk, 1561–1935 (5th ed.). Ipswich: Suffolk Record Office. ISBN 0-86055-178-4.
- Brayshay, Mark, ed. (1996). Topographical Writers in South-West England. Exeter: University of Exeter Press. ISBN 0-85989-424-X.
- Broadway, Jan (2006). "No Historie So Meete": gentry culture and the development of local history in Elizabethan and early Stuart England. Manchester: Manchester University Press. ISBN 978-0-7190-7294-9.
- Brown, Tony; Foard, Glenn (1994). The Making of a County History: John Bridges' Northamptonshire. Leicester: University of Leicester; Northamptonshire County Council. ISBN 0-947590-20-X.
- Currie, C. R. J.; Lewis, C. P., eds. (1994). English County Histories: a guide. Stroud: Alan Sutton. ISBN 0-7509-0289-2.
- Gray, Irvine (1981). Antiquaries of Gloucestershire and Bristol. Bristol: Bristol and Gloucestershire Archaeological Society. ISBN 0-900197-14-5.
- Greenslade, M. W. (1982). The Staffordshire Historians. Collections for a History of Staffordshire 4th series. Vol. 11. Stoke-on-Trent: Staffordshire Record Society.
- Mendyk, S. A. E. (1989). "Speculum Britanniae": regional study, antiquarianism and science in Britain to 1700. Toronto: University of Toronto Press. ISBN 0-8020-5744-6.
- Simmons, Jack, ed. (1978). English County Historians: first series. Wakefield: EP Publishing. ISBN 0-7158-1309-9.
- Sweet, Rosemary (1997). The Writing of Urban Histories in Eighteenth-Century England. Oxford: Clarendon. ISBN 0-19-820669-0.
- Sweet, Rosemary (2004). Antiquaries: the Discovery of the Past in Eighteenth-Century Britain. London: Hambledon and London. pp. 36–42. ISBN 1-85285-309-3.
