= Ogborne =

Ogborne is a surname. Notable people with the surname include:

- Alfie Ogborne (born 2003), English cricketer
- David Ogborne (died 1800/1), English artist
- Elizabeth Ogborne (1763/4–1853), English antiquary
- John Ogborne (1755–1837), English engraver

== See also ==
- Osborne (name)
