= Harwich Dockyard =

Royal Navy Dockyard in Essex, England

Coordinates: 51.94452°N 1.29010°E

HM Dockyard, Harwich
- Harwich, Essex
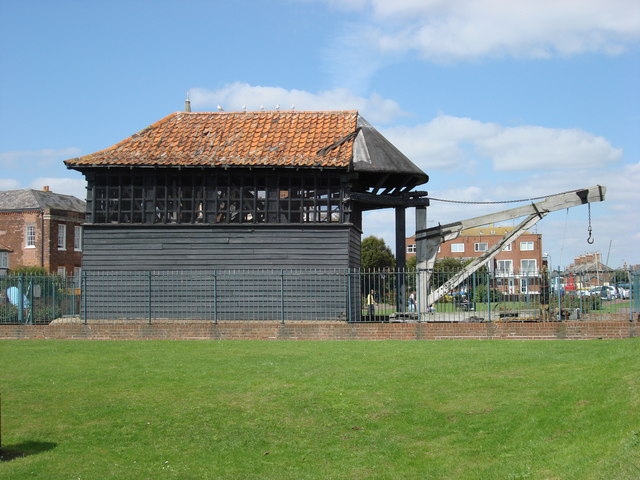
- Seventeenth-century dockyard crane on Harwich Green (moved there from the Naval Yard in 1930).

Site information
- Operator: English Navy (1652–1660), Royal Navy (1660–1717)
- Controlled by: The Navy Board (1652–1717).

Site history
- In use: 1326–1829

Harwich Dockyard (also known as The King's Yard, Harwich) was a Royal Navy Dockyard at Harwich in Essex, active in the 17th and early 18th century (after which it continued to operate under private ownership). Owing to its position on the East Coast of England, the yard was of strategic importance during the Anglo-Dutch Wars; however, due to a lack of deep-water access and the difficulty of setting off from Harwich against an easterly wind, its usefulness was somewhat limited and its facilities remained small-scale compared to the other Royal Dockyards over the same period. Nonetheless, it remained actively involved in repairing and refitting the nation's warships, as well as building them: of the eighty ships built for the Royal Navy in Britain between 1660 and 1688, fourteen were built at Harwich Dockyard. (Naval vessels had occasionally been built at Harwich in earlier times, but by private shipbuilders on or around the Town Quay).

After the Royal Navy withdrew from the yard in 1713, shipbuilding continued on the site under private ownership; over the course of the next century, through to the end of the Napoleonic Wars, just under forty more warships were built there.

The present-day name for the site of the former Dockyard is 'Harwich Navyard'; for the past 50 years it has been run as a commercial port, however in 2018 plans were announced for it to be transformed into space for more than 300 homes.

== History ==
During the Hundred Years' War, Harwich was an important assembly point for the Navy; in June 1340 King Edward III set sail for France from the mouth of the Orwell with a fleet of 200 ships, engaging the French fleet off the coast of Flanders in the Battle of Sluys. In 1405 a fort was built on the promontory at the north-easternmost part of the town. Over the following century the fort fell into disrepair, but during the Commonwealth period, the government took out a 99-year lease on the parcel of land on which the fort had stood in order to establish a naval dockyard there. The yard was praised by General Monck for its efficiency in fitting out the fleet.

Following the Restoration, in 1660, the yard was run down and leased out to private ownership. In 1664, however, the yard was taken back under Crown control: a new resident Commissioner (John Taylor) was appointed and Samuel Pepys, as Clerk of the Acts of the Navy, engaged his protégé Anthony Deane as Master Shipwright. The years of the Second Dutch War would prove to be the most prestigious for Harwich Dockyard (in terms of the volume and strategic importance of its activity). Not only was it kept busy repairing and refitting naval vessels on their way to and from the front line, but under Deane's skilled oversight it also began to be active in shipbuilding. Despite its relatively small size as a Royal Dockyard, Harwich developed a particular speciality for itself in constructing small and medium-sized fighting ships. In 1668, however, after peace had been restored, the dockyard was again run down: its officers were reassigned (except for the Storekeeper, Silas Taylor, who was left more or less in sole charge).

During the Third Dutch War, the Dockyard was again put to work, but by this time its front-line role had been eclipsed by the Navy's new East-Coast dockyard at Sheerness. Nevertheless, between 1673 and 1675 Anthony Deane (now a Commissioner of the Navy) built three more warships at Harwich Dockyard, this time as a private contractor; one of these, HMS Harwich, was considered by Pepys to be one of the finest vessels in the Navy. Again, once peace had been re-established, the yard was wound down; by 1676 its storehouses had been given over to the Royal Fishery Company. The following year, however, a new Master Shipwright was appointed (Isaac Betts) and shipbuilding began again.

In 1676, Silas Taylor (the aforementioned 'Keeper of the King's Stores at Harwich') wrote a description of the dockyard: it had wharves, built on reclaimed land, with strong cranes (one of which had been rendered unusable by the action of the tide depositing sand against the wharf). There was a 'Great Gate' over which were placed the Royal Arms, "carved and in colours", and above which (inside and outside) were the dials of an "excellent" pendulum clock, which struck the hours on a bell in a turret (which also served as a muster bell, rung at the start and end of the working day). Within the yard he noted that there were several storehouses, "launches" (slipways) for building and launching ships, and offices for the officers of the yard.

Harwich ceased to operate as a Royal Dockyard in 1713, but was leased to a succession of private operators (including John Barnard, Messrs Barnard & Turner, and Joseph Graham) under whom naval and commercial shipbuilding continued. The last Royal Navy vessel to be built at Harwich was HMS Scarborough in 1812; the last commercial vessels were ten steamers, built between 1825 and 1827. The Navy maintained a small storage and refitting base on site until 1829.

One unusual structure surviving from the dockyard is a very rare treadwheel crane of 1667, which was in use until the early twentieth century before being re-sited on Harwich Green in the 1930s. The dockyard bell, dating from 1666, is preserved on the original site, which still operates as a commercial port (known as Navyard since 1964).

=== Other Naval facilities at Harwich ===
During the First World War a flotilla, the Harwich Force, was based at the port.

During the Second World War parts of Harwich were again requisitioned for naval use, and ships were based at HMS Badger, a shore establishment on the site of what is now Harwich International Port. Badger was decommissioned in 1946, but the Royal Naval Auxiliary Service maintained a headquarters on its site until 1992.

== Administration of the dockyard and other key officials ==
The Master Shipwright was the key official at the royal navy dockyards until the introduction of resident commissioners by the Navy Board after which he became deputy to the resident commissioner.

=== Resident Commissioner of the Navy, Harwich Dockyard ===
1. 1652–1660, Major Nehemiah Bourne
2. 1664–1668, Captain John Taylor

=== Master shipwright, Harwich Dockyard ===
Post holders included:

1. 1653–1659, Robert Grassingham
2. 1664–1668, Anthony Deane
3. 1677–1680, Isaac Betts
4. 1694–1695, Robert Shortis
5. 1695–1698, Thomas Podd
6. 1702 Jan-Nov, Benjamin Rosewell
7. 1702–1705, John Lock
8. 1705 Mar-Nov, Jacob Ackworth
9. 1705–1706, Fisher Harding
10. 1706–1709, John Poulter
11. 1709–1711, John Naish
12. 1711–1717, Paul Stigant

=== Clerk of the Cheque, Harwich Dockyard ===
Post holders included:

1. [in post by 1668], John Gregory
2. [in post by 1677], John Brown
3. [in post by 1680], Simon Sandford
4. [in post by 1702], J. Fearne

=== Storekeeper, Harwich Dockyard ===
Post holders included:

1. 1664- 1678, Silas Taylor
2. [in post by 1679], Mr Brown
3. [in post by 1681], Joseph Fownes
4. [in post by 1693], J. Fearne

=== Clerk of the Cheque and Storekeeper, Harwich Dockyard ===
Post holders included:

1. 1702-?1713, Capt. Edmund Allen
2. [in post by] 1711, Daniel Wiseman
3. 1715–1722, Charles Aleyn
4. 1722–1728, James Banks
5. 1728 Mar-Sep, Thomas Colby
6. 1728–1756, George Bagnold
7. 1756–1765, George Purvis
8. 1765–1766, Charles Howard
9. 1804–1827, John Hopkins

== Ships built at the dockyard ==
The first ship to be built at the dockyard following the Restoration was the eponymous HMS Harwich, a 5-gun hoy launched in 1660. Between 1660 and 1827 some 56 men-of-war were built there, including the following (a wooden board on the present-day Navyard gate gives a fuller list).

Date	Ship	Notes	Ref
1666	HMS Rupert	third rate, 66 guns.	
1667	HMS Resolution	third rate, 70 guns.	
1673	HMS Swiftsure	third rate, 70 guns.	
1674	HMS Harwich	third rate, 70 guns.	
1675	HMS Sapphire	fifth rate, 32 guns.	
1678	HMS Restoration	third rate, 70 guns.	
1679	HMS Breda	third rate, 70 guns.	
1679	HMS Sandwich	second rate, 90 guns.	
1680	HMS Albemarle	second rate, 90 guns.	
1694	HMS Ipswich	third rate, 70 guns	
1696	HMS Yarmouth	third rate, 74 guns.	
1743	HMS Harwich	fourth rate, 50 guns.	
1744	HMS Colchester	fourth rate, 50 guns.	
1745	HMS Eagle	fourth rate, 58 guns.	
1746	HMS Lichfield	fourth rate, 50 guns.	
1747	HMS Severn	fourth rate, 50 guns.	
1748	HMS Seahorse	sixth rate, 24 guns.	
1757	HMS Achilles	fourth rate, 60 guns.	
1758	HMS Conqueror	third rate, 68 guns.	
1758	HMS Alarm	fifth rate, 32 guns.	
1761	HMS Arrogant	third rate, 74 guns.	
1762	HMS Terrible	third rate, 74 guns.	
1764	HMS Robust	third rate, 74 guns.	
1773	HMS Orpheus	fifth rate, 32 guns.	
1774	HMS Centurion	fourth rate, 50 guns.	
1775	HMS Sultan	third rate, 74 guns.	
1777	HMS Proserpine	sixth rate, 28 guns.	
1780	HMS Inflexible	third rate, 64 guns.	
1782	HMS Irresistible	third rate, 74 guns.	
1785	HMS Castor	fifth rate, 32 guns.	
1786	HMS Hannibal	third rate, 74 guns.	
1787	HMS Excellent	third rate, 74 guns.	
1794	HMS Alcmene	fifth rate, 32 guns.	
1797	HMS Ethalion	fifth rate, 38 guns.	
1797	HMS Busy	brig-sloop, 18 guns.	
1801	HMS Conqueror	third rate, 74 guns.	
1810	HMS Vengeur	third rate, 74 guns.	
1812	HMS Scarborough	third rate, 74 guns.	
