= Anthony Allen =

Anthony Allen may refer to:

== Sports ==
- Anthony Allen (wide receiver) (born 1959), former professional American football wide receiver
- Anthony Allen (running back) (born 1988), professional American & Canadian football running back
- Anthony Allen (rugby union) (born 1986), English rugby union player

== Others ==
- Anthony Allen (lawyer) (died 1754), English lawyer and antiquary
- Anthony Adrian Allen (1913–2010), English entomologist
- J Anthony Allen (born 1978), American composer and producer

== See also ==
- Tony Allen (disambiguation)
- Anthony Allan (disambiguation)
- Allen (surname)
