= James Bowen =

James Bowen may refer to:

- James Bowen (Royal Navy officer) (1751–1835)
- James Bowen (artist) (died 1774), English painter and topographer
- James Barton Bowen (1815–1881), mayor of Madison, Wisconsin
- James Bevan Bowen (MP) (1828–1905), British Member of Parliament for Pembrokeshire
- James Bevan Bowen (RAF officer) (1883–1969)
- James Bowen (railroad executive) (1808–1886), American railroad executive
- James Bowen (author) (born 1979), author of A Street Cat Named Bob
- James Bowen (footballer) (born 1996), English footballer
- James M. Bowen (1793–1880), first owner of Mirador

== See also ==
- Jim Bowen (1937–2018), English stand-up comedian and television personality
- Jimmy Bowen (born 1937), American record producer and rockabilly singer
- Jimmy Bowen (rugby union) (born 1957), Irish rugby union player
