= Nicholas Darnell =

Nicholas Darnell may refer to:

- Nicholas Henry Darnell (1807–1885), American politician in Tennessee and Texas
- Nicholas Darnell (cricketer) (1817–1892), English cricketer, barrister and Catholic priest
