= William Burton (antiquary, died 1645) =

English antiquarian (1575–1645)

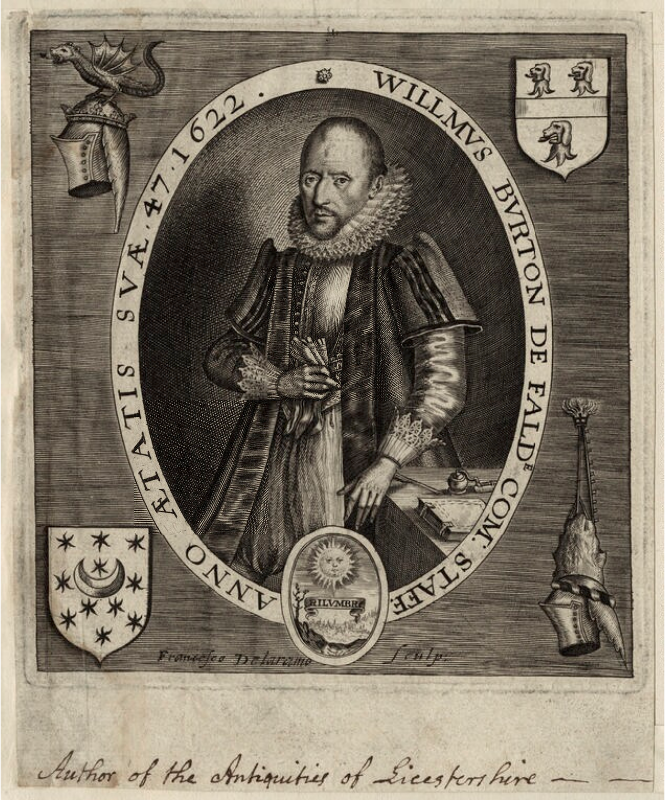
Portrait of Burton, engraved by Francis Delaram. This engraving was used as a frontispiece to Burton's Description of Leicester Shire (1622).

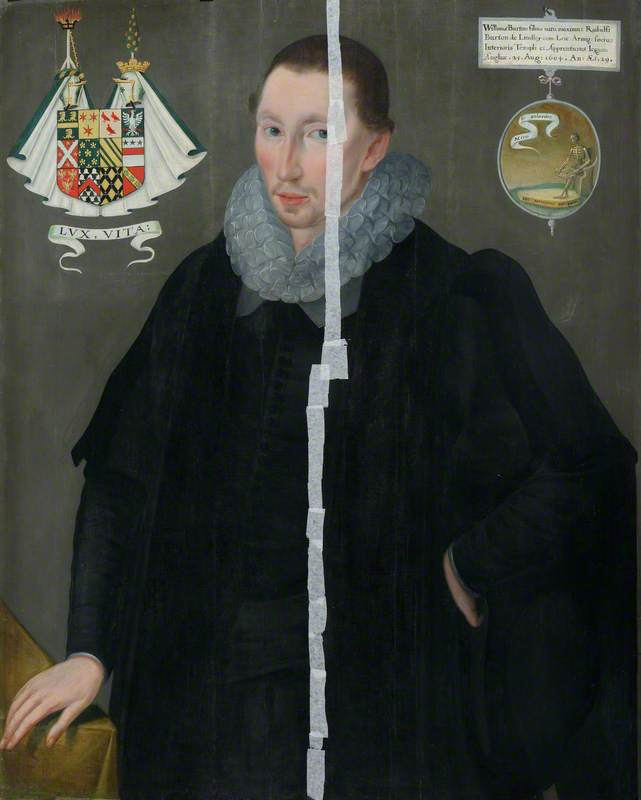
Portrait attributed to William Segar, Society of Antiquaries of London

William Burton (24 August 1575 – 6 April 1645) was an English antiquarian, best known as the author of the Description of Leicester Shire (1622), the county's first published county history.

== Life ==
Burton was the son of Ralph Burton, and elder brother of Robert Burton, born at Lindley in Leicestershire on 24 August 1575. He was the nephew of Arthur Faunt.

At the age of nine he went to school at Nuneaton, and on 29 September 1591 entered Brasenose College, Oxford (B.A. 22 June 1594). He was admitted, on 20 May 1593, to the Inner Temple. He was one of a group of antiquaries there, including Sir John Ferne, Thomas Gainsford, and Peter Manwood.

On 20 May 1603 he was called to the bar, but soon afterwards, owing to weak health, he retired to the village of Falde in Staffordshire, where he owned an estate. Among his particular friends were Sir Robert Cotton and William Somner. In his account of Fenny Drayton he speaks of his "old acquaintance" Michael Drayton. When the First English Civil War broke out, Burton sided with the royalists, and endured persecution. He died at Falde on 6 April 1645, and was buried in the parish church at Hanbury.

== Works ==
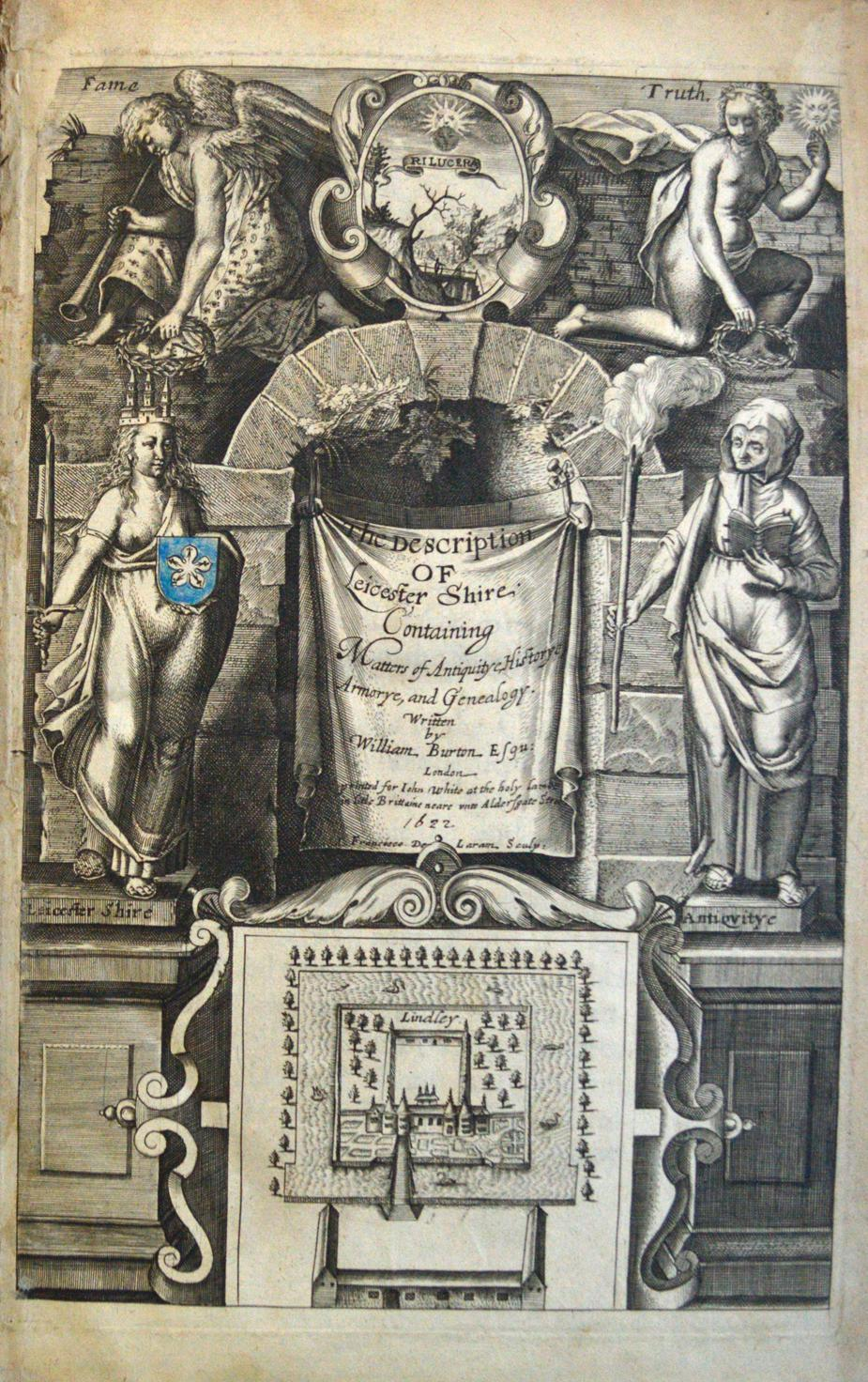
Frontispiece to Burton's Description of Leicester Shire (1622)

He wrote in 1596 an unpublished Latin comedy, De Amoribus Perinthii et Tyanthes. In 1597 he published with Thomas Creede a translation of Cleitophon and Leucippe from the Greek of Achilles Tatius, with a dedication to the Earl of Southampton. Burton knew Spanish and Italian, and studied the emblem-writers, but his interest lay chiefly in heraldry and topography. In 1602 he issued a corrected copy, printed at Antwerp, of Christopher Saxton's map of the county of Leicester.

His county history, the Description of Leicester Shire, was begun by 1597. It appeared in print in 1622, dedicated to George Villiers, Marquess of Buckingham. Burton then spent years in making large additions and corrections for a new edition. In the summer of 1638 a copy of the intended second edition was sent to London for press. However the whole project was "overtaken by more momentous events – the outbreak of the Civil War – and had to be abandoned". It is not known what became of this manuscript.

Burton began work on a further revised version of the work in 1641. After Burton's death his son Cassibelan presented the materials for this final version to Walter Chetwynd, comprising a copy of the Description with large manuscript additions by the author, a folio manuscript with further additions and corrections, and a further secretary-hand copy with further additions, corrections and omissions. These are now in the Staffordshire Record Office. In 1798 Shaw discovered this copy at Ingestree, and it was utilised by John Nichols in the third and fourth volumes of his Leicestershire. In 1777 there was published by subscription a folio edition which claimed to be enlarged and corrected; the information contained in the Description was incorporated in Nichols's Leicestershire.

William Dugdale in his Autobiography acknowledges the assistance which he had received from Burton. In 1612 Thomas Purefoy of Barwell in Warwickshire bequeathed at his death to Burton the original manuscript of John Leland's Collectanea. Anthony Wood says Burton needlessly expanded this work; but Thomas Hearne, in the preface to his edition of the Collectanea, denies that. In 1631 Burton caused part of Leland's Itinerary to be transcribed, and in the following year he gave five quarto volumes of Leland's autograph manuscripts to the Bodleian Library.

Among the manuscripts that he left were:

- Antiquitates de Lindley, which was later in the possession of Samuel Lysons, who lent it to Nichols and is now in the British Library (Additional MS 6046);
- Antiquitates de Dadlington Manerio, com. Leic., which in Nichols's time belonged to Nicholas Hurst of Hinckley;
- Antiquitates de Falde (British Library Additional MS 31917)
- Collections towards a history of Thedingworth.

About 1735 Francis Peck announced his intention of writing Burton's life, but did not do so.

== Family ==
In 1607 Burton married Jane, daughter of Humfrey Adderley of Weddington, in Warwickshire, by whom he had a son, Cassibelan Burton.
