= Hugh Moises =

English schoolmaster

Hugo or Hugh Moises (9 April 1722 – 5 July 1806) was a notable English schoolmaster.

== Life ==
The son of Edward Moises, M.A., vicar of Wymeswold, Leicestershire, he was born there on 9 April 1722. Educated first at Wrexham School in Denbighshire, he moved to Chesterfield grammar school, Derbyshire, under the Rev. Dr. Burroughs. In 1741 he went to Trinity College, Cambridge, where his elder brother Edward Moises, later vicar of Masham, Yorkshire, was a fellow. He graduated B.A. in 1745, with a reputation as a classical scholar, and shortly elected a fellow of Peterhouse. In the same year he became an assistant in the school of his old teacher at Chesterfield, where he continued till 1749. In that year he proceeded M.A.

Also in 1749, on the recommendation of Edmund Keene, Moises was appointed headmaster of Newcastle Free School, in succession to Richard Dawes. The school at the time had few pupils, but Moises raised standards, becoming admired for his consistent approach. In 1750 the corporation of Newcastle raised his salary, and on 21 April 1761 they appointed him to the morning-lectureship of All Saints' Church. On 14 June 1779, he was appointed master of St. Mary's Hospital, Newcastle.

In 1787 Moises was presented to the rectory of Greystoke, Cumberland, and resigned the mastership of the school, after nearly 40 years; he was succeeded by his nephew, the Rev. Edward Moises, M.A., who was vicar of Hart and Hartlepool from 1811. After living at Greystoke for some years he resigned the rectory, at the patron's request, and he spent the last years of his life in Newcastle. In 1801 he was appointed one of the chaplains to his old pupil Lord Eldon, who had become Lord Chancellor.

Moises died at his house in Northumberland Street, Newcastle, on 5 July 1806. His memorial in Newcastle Cathedral was sculpted by John Flaxman.

== Pupils ==
Moises taught the following prominent figures: John Scott, 1st Earl of Eldon; William Scott, Lord Stowell; and Cuthbert Collingwood, 1st Baron Collingwood. Other pupils included:

- John Brand
- John Brewster
- William Nicholas Darnell
- John Marshall
- George Walker

== Memorial ==
In 1810 a mural monument, executed by John Flaxman, with a Latin inscription composed by Sir William Scott, was erected to Moises in St Mary's porch, St Nicholas's Church. The cost was raised by a subscription among his pupils.

== Family ==
Moises married three times. His first wife was Margaret, the sister of Matthew Ridley the Member of Parliament; they were wed in 1754. In 1758 he married Isabel Ellison, and they had a son, Hugh (died 1822). In 1764 he married again Ann Boag, and they had a son William Bell.

== Notes ==
Attribution

This article incorporates text from a publication now in the public domain: Lee, Sidney, ed. (1894). "Moises, Hugh". Dictionary of National Biography. Vol. 38. London: Smith, Elder & Co.
