= William Holman (antiquary) =

English antiquarian

- Died: 4 November 1730
- Occupation: Antiquarian

William Holman (died 4 November 1730) was an English antiquarian.

== Biography ==
Holman was a congregational minister at Stepney, Middlesex, whence he was transferred to Halstead, Essex, in 1700. During the last twenty years of his life, he diligently collected materials for a history of Essex, and visited every town and village in the county (Gough, British Topography, i. 343). He also made large extracts from Thomas Jekyll's Essex collections, filling, according to Morant, ‘above four hundred’ volumes. He died suddenly in the porch of Colne Engaine Church, Essex, on 4 November 1730 (Davies, Evangelical Nonconformity in Essex, p. 403).

The subsequent history of Holman's manuscripts is very confused. Gough asserts (ib. i. 370) that Holman's papers after his death were sold by his son, a draper at Sudbury, Suffolk, and that Nathaniel Salmon (author of the “History of Essex,” published in 1740) bought them in 1739, and afterwards sold part to Anthony Allen, master in chancery, from whom they are supposed to have come to John Booth, F.S.A. But from a document preserved in the Colchester Museum it appears that Holman himself sold his manuscripts to the vicar of Halstead, and Morant, who was then curate there, was a witness of the sale. In another place (ib. i. 344) Gough says that Holman's papers came into Dr. Richard Rawlinson's hands, and were left by him in 1785 to the Bodleian Library. This statement is also erroneous, for Morant, in a letter to Gough. dated 5 September 1769, tells him that Rawlinson bought only the ‘refuse’ of Holman's manuscripts (Nichols, Lit. Anecd. ii, 705), and very few of Holman's notes are now among the Rawlinson MSS. Morant, by his own account, had in his possession the larger mass of Holman's papers, from which he derived by far the most valuable part of his volumes. They afterwards became the property of the Hills of Earl's Colne, near Halstead, who were related to Morant. About twenty to twenty-five volumes were presented to the corporation of Colchester by the father of the present representative of the family, and are now in the museum there.

Holman also compiled in 1715 an ‘exact catalogue’ of the Jekyll MSS., which afterwards belonged to the Anstises, and subsequently came to the library of All Souls’ College, Oxford, where it now is, No. 297. A copy is in the British Museum, Egerton MS. 2832, f. 183.
