= Cassibelan Burton =

English translator (1609–1682)

Cassibelan Burton (19 November 1609 – 16 February 1682) was a 17th-century English translator of Latin works.

Burton was the only son of William Burton (d. 1645), the historian of Leicestershire, by his wife Jane, daughter of Humfrey Adderley of Weddington, Warwickshire, and descended from Nicholas de Burton of Tutbury.

Burton inherited his father's collections in 1645, and handed them over to Walter Chetwynd, "to be used by him in writing The Antiquities of Staffordshire". His uncle was Robert Burton, author of The Anatomy of Melancholy.

He translated Martial into English verse, but the translation remained in manuscript. His friend Sir Aston Cockayne thought highly of it.

Anthony Wood states that he was extravagant. He died on 28 February 1682.
