= Sir John Eliot, 1st Baronet =

Scottish physician (1736–1786)

Sir John Eliot, 1st Baronet (1736 – 7 November 1786) was a Scottish physician and Physician to the Prince of Wales.

== Life ==
Eliot, the son of a Writer to the signet, was born in Edinburgh in 1736, and, after education under Nathaniel Jesse, became assistant to a London apothecary. He then sailed as surgeon to a privateer. Having obtained some prize-money in this service, he decided to become a physician, and graduated with an M.D. from the University of St Andrews on 6 November 1759. He was admitted as a licentiate of the College of Physicians of London, 30 September 1762. A fellow Scot, Sir William Duncan, then the King's Physician, gave him help, and he soon made a large income. In the 1760s Elizabeth Ogborne was born to a tea dealer in London and she reported that Sir John Eliot was her father. In 1776 he was knighted, was created a baronet 25 July 1778, and became physician to the Prince of Wales.

When attending the Prince during an illness in 1786, Eliot told Queen Charlotte that he had been preaching to him against intemperance "as any bishop could have done"; to which the Queen replied, "And probably with like success". On 19 October 1771 he married Grace Dalrymple, who ran away with Lord Valentia in 1774. Eliot obtained £12,000 damages.

He lived in Great Marlborough Street, London. He died, 7 November 1786, at Brocket Hall, Hertfordshire, the seat of his friend Peniston Lamb, 1st Viscount Melbourne. He was buried in the parish church of Bishops Hatfield, and a tablet to his memory, with some lines by Edward Jerningham on it, was put up by his uncle, William Davidson.

Baronetage of Great Britain
New title	Baronet (of Peebles); 1778–1786	Extinct
Preceded by Bickerton baronets	Eliot baronets of Peebles; 25 July 1778	Succeeded by Hawkins baronets
