= Anthony Allan =

Anthony or Tony Allan may refer to:

- Anthony Havelock-Allan (1904–2003), British film producer and screenwriter
- John Hubbard (actor) (1914–1988), known as Anthony Allan
- John Anthony Allan (1937–2021), known as Tony Allan, geographer at King's College London
- Tony Allan (1949–2004), British DJ and voiceover artist
- Tony Allan (jockey), New Zealand jockey

== See also ==
- Anthony Allen (disambiguation)
- Tony Allen (disambiguation)
