= Bickerton baronets =

The Bickerton Baronetcy, of Upwood in the County of Huntingdon, was a title in the Baronetage of Great Britain. It was created on 29 May 1778 for Sir Richard Bickerton, a British naval commander who later rose to the rank of rear admiral and represented Rochester in the British House of Commons.

His son, Sir Richard Bickerton, 2nd Baronet, also became a Royal Navy officer before succeeding to the baronetcy in 1792. He became a Lord of the Admiralty, represented Poole in the House of Commons, and rose to the rank of admiral. The baronetcy became extinct on his death in 1832.

== Bickerton baronets, of Upwood (1778) ==
- Sir Richard Bickerton, 1st Baronet (1727–1792)
- Sir Richard Hussey Bickerton, 2nd Baronet (1759–1832)

Baronetage of Great Britain
Preceded by Hood baronets	Bickerton baronets of Upwood; 29 May 1778	Succeeded by Eliot baronets
