= Edward Bright =

Fattest man in England (1721–1750)

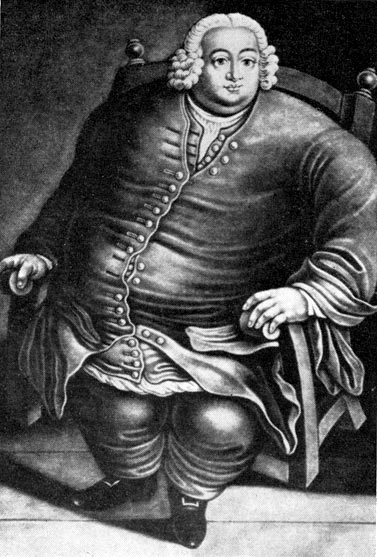
- Born: 1721; Maldon, Essex
- Died: 10 November 1750 (aged 28–29); Essex
- Other name: Fat Man of Maldon

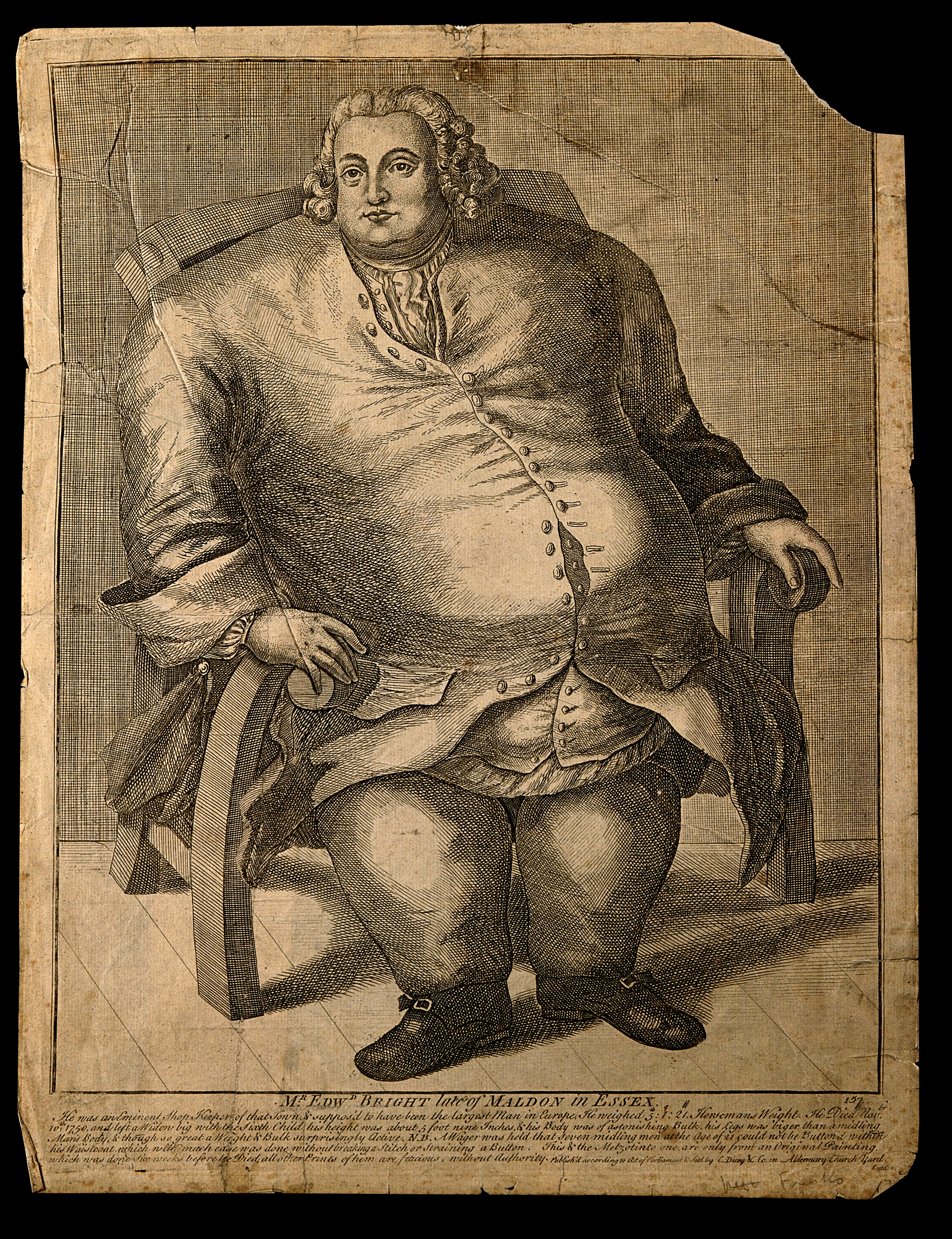
An engraving based on an illustration made six weeks before Bright's death

Edward Bright (1721–1750) was a grocer in Maldon, Essex, England – known as the "fat man of Maldon" – who was reputed at the time of his death in 1750 to be the "fattest man in England". He lived in a house on Maldon's High Street, and is buried in Maldon's Church of All Saints. Bright weighed 47.5 stone (665 lb or 302 kg).

On 1 December 1750, a wager took place at the Black Bull Inn, in Maldon High Street. Bright's coat was said to be large enough to have seven men stand inside it, although this is also sometimes stated as seven hundred men because of a tale in which a man in a local pub tempted a gambler with a bet that "seven hundred men" would fit into Edward Bright's waistcoat. The bet was accepted. The gambler lost, because seven men from the Dengie Hundred (a parcel of land) fit into the waistcoat.

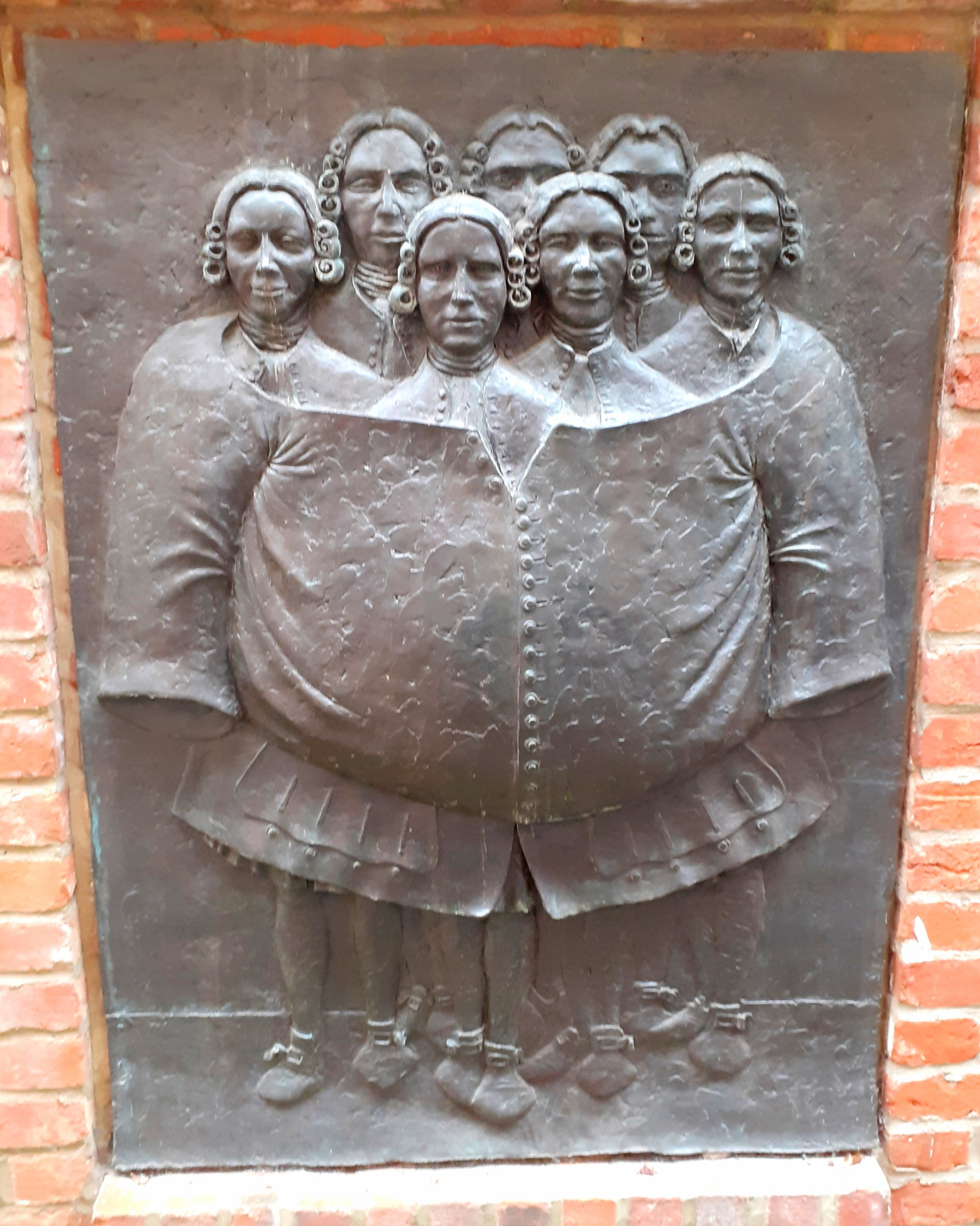
Edward Bright Sculpture in Maldon, Essex, showing the size of his jacket

On 1 December 1751, a second wager was decided at the Kings Head Inn also in Maldon High Street, for a 'Ham and Chickens and some gallons of wine', when the following nine men fitted into his waistcoat:

- The Reverend Humphury Smythies
- Mr Bridge, Coal Merchant
- Joseph Pattison, Grocer
- Jonas Malden, Apothecary
- Daniel Finch, Butcher
- James Richardson, Farmer
- John Crow, Parish Clerk
- John Draper, Watchmaker
- Thomas Williams, Custom Officer

Bright's portrait was painted in 1750 by David Ogborne (1700–1768), after whose painting various etchings were published, including:

- 1750 – Irish engraver James McArdell (1728–1765)
- 1751 – Anthony Walker, published by John Hinton

In 2000, a bronze relief of seven men in Bright's coat, by sculptor Catharni Stern, was installed at the King's Head Centre off Maldon's High Street, near the site of Bright's home.

Edward Bright was buried in All Saints' church in Maldon on 12 November 1750, aged 29. He required a special coffin. The church records show that "A way was cut through the wall and staircase to let it down into the shop; it was drawn upon a carriage to the church and slid upon rollers to the vault made of brickwork, and interred by the help of a triangle and pulley. He was a very honest tradesman, a facetious companion, comely in his person, affable in his temper, a tender father and valuable friend."

== See also ==
- List of the heaviest people
