= William Darnell =

English cleric, academic and antiquarian

William Nicholas Darnell (14 March 1776 – 19 June 1865) was an English cleric, academic and antiquarian.

== Life ==
He was the son of William Darnell, a wine-merchant of Newcastle-upon-Tyne, where he was born on 14 March 1776. He was educated at Newcastle grammar school under Hugh Moises and his nephew Edward Moises. He matriculated at Corpus Christi College, Oxford in 1792, at age 16, elected to the Durham scholarship. He graduated B.A. in 1796, M.A. in 1800, and B.D. in 1808, and became a Fellow and tutor of the college. He was ordained deacon in 1801 and priest in 1802.

Darnell was appointed university examiner in 1801, 1803, and 1804, and select preacher in 1807. Among his pupils at Corpus was John Keble, who in 1847 dedicated to Darnell a volume of sermons "in ever grateful memory of invaluable helps and warnings received from him in early youth."

In 1809 Darnell left Oxford in 1809, having been presented by Archdeacon Charles Thorp to the rectory of St Mary-le-Bow, Durham, which he held until 1815. Then he was moved by Shute Barrington to the vicarage of Stockton-upon-Tees, with a prebend in Durham Cathedral. From 1820 to 1827 he was perpetual curate of St Margaret's Church, Durham, and from 1827 to 1831 vicar of Norham; for some years before 1828 he had held the Yorkshire vicarage of Lastingham, a preferment from Lord Eldon.

In 1831, Henry Phillpotts became bishop of Exeter, and Darnell exchanged his Durham prebend for the rectory of Stanhope held by Phillpotts. He was rector there for the rest of his life. The Stanhope living had a large income from lead mining. Phillpotts required a special arrangement with Darnell, to compensate for his financial loss in moving to Exeter.

Darnell died on 19 June 1865. He was buried on 24 June in the churchyard of Durham Cathedral.

== Legacy ==
Darnell built a church at Thornley, Weardale in the parish of Wolsingham, where he had an estate. He also instituted the Darnell School Prize Fund for the encouragement of the study of the Book of Common Prayer in schools.

== Works ==
=== Antiquarian ===
In 1804 Darnell became a Fellow of the Society of Antiquaries of London, and he was for some time years a member of the Society of Antiquaries of Newcastle upon Tyne.

Darnell edited from the manuscripts in the Dean and Chapter Library the Correspondence of Isaac Basire, published 1831. That year saw the publication of the anonymous Remarks upon the Defects and Inaccuracies of "The correspondence of Isaac Basire, by W.N. Darnell". A critique described as "deadly", it emphasised Darnell's limited selection of sources.

=== Other works ===
In 1816 Darnell issued a volume of sermons dedicated to his patron Shute Barrington; and in 1818 an abridgment of Jeremy Taylor's Great Exemplar of Sanctity. He published an edition of the Book of Wisdom, and in 1839 An Arrangement and Classification of the Psalms.

Darnell printed some sermons, including one on the death of his friend and schoolfellow, Henry Burrell of Lincoln's Inn, preached at Bolton Chapel in Northumberland. His "Lines suggested by the Death of Lord Collingwood", on Cuthbert Collingwood, 1st Baron Collingwood, another pupil of Newcastle grammar school, were reprinted by John Adamson in 1842. A ballad "The King of the Picts and St. Cuthbert" is in James Raine's History of North Durham.

== Family ==
Darnell married in 1815 Elizabeth Bowe (died 1864) of Scorton, daughter of the Rev. William Bowe. They had five sons and three daughters:

- The first son William (born 1816) became vicar of Bamburgh. He married Frances Thorp, eldest daughter of Archdeacon Charles Thorp.
- The second, Nicholas (born 1817), was a Catholic convert.
- Frances Anne (1818–1889), married 1840 the Rev. Henry Fitzhardinge Berkeley Portman (1811–1893).
- Bryan Henry Darnell (1820–1906) was a founder in 1857 of the Cape Argus.
- Elizabeth Jane (born 1822).
- Philip Wheler (1823–1850) was a naval officer. He died at sea and was commemorated by painted windows in St Aidan's Church, Bamburgh.
- Thomas Charles (born 1824), of the Bengal Army, married in 1853 Emily Jane Fitzgerald.
- Jane Grace (born 1829).
