= Catharni Stern =

English sculptor and art teacher (1925–2015)

- Born: 22 August 1925; Southsea, Hampshire
- Died: 16 June 2015 (aged 89); St Minver, Cornwall
- Known for: Sculpture

Catharni Stern (22 August 1925 – 16 June 2015) was an English sculptor and art teacher.

== Early life and education ==
Catharni Stern was born on 22 August 1925. Her governess Miss Cox conventionally restricted her when Catharni was young. At the age of six, she got a prolonged illness and was confined to bed for half a year, which became the major restriction of her childhood. But she was not deprived of creative exploration, such as in modelling with clay found on the beach at Bude during the ritual annual fortnight at the seaside or in carving motor cars out of blocks of salt.

Catharni was constantly experiencing changing schools in both the public and private systems because of her family's moving house. She was educated at Chelmsford County High School then studied at the Mid-Essex School of Art, Chelmsford. Then, Catharni took a job on a farm working with sheep. She was eager for fame, excitement and exploration and then she applied to and was accepted by Liverpool University to study for a degree at the School of Veterinary Science. Her agricultural career was put to an end after two years because of a hernia, but she went on to work on a milk round. Then she was enrolled at Chelmsford Art School to do a course in Commercial Art. After one year, she moved to the Regent Street Polytechnic to study Fine Art. She then spent the next two years studying sculpture at Chelmsford. She successfully completed her N.D.D. course with sculpture as her specialist subject and was then accepted by the Royal Academy School where she studied for a further two years. In 1953, she received the Feodora Gliechen Award for Sculpture

== Works ==
Stern worked at Poole Potteries during the 1950s.

In 1957 her sculpture Racehorse was included as one of the 'Young Artists of Promise' in Jack Beddington's book. Catharni Stern studied one year A.T.D. course at London University Institute of Education. Then there came a turning point in Catharni Stern's career in 1960: She left her teaching job at Bournemouth and applied for and was appointed to a post as part-time Tutor at Bournemouth College of Art. She was then able to devote her energies to the production of sculpture. Shortly thereafter she was offered a full-time post at Saint Martin's School of Art in London but declined, preferring instead to continue part-time teaching there and at Southend School of Art.

She has been active in producing sculpture, paintings, and other graphic media. Her style has been modernist, but also realist.

During the holidays Catharni Stern devoted all her energies to sculpture in an old stable block which she used as a studio. It was tucked away behind Market Hill in her hometown of Maldon, Essex. From 1955 to 1960, she produced a great deal of work and a recollection of her studio. Some of the work showed evidence of stylistic. During those years she gradually became an identifiable voice.

With regard to the use of media: Catharni Stern has done rather less carving but she has made more use of clay. Her approach remains consistent because the works are directly modelled in order to enable them to be fired to partially vitrified terracotta or to stoneware temperatures. She has brought a dignify to the medium that for many years has been largely absent.

=== Exhibitions ===
Stern had an exhibition at the Ransome Gallery in 1977. And her exhibition with the Alwin Gallery in 1981 was entirely of bronzes. She undertook two major carvings in wood, both Madonnas, one for the Diocese of Truro and the other for Willesden Parish Church. She has exhibited in London, East Anglia and the Netherlands. Her last major exhibition was in 1994, but a retrospective exhibition was conducted at Chelmsford Museum in 2006.

=== Public art ===
Stern's bronze sculpture St Francis is in Chelmsford, and a terracotta St Francis is in St Giles' Church, Langford; a bronze relief Seven Men in the Waistcoat of Edward Bright (the Fat Man of Maldon), is in the Kings Head Centre, Maldon; she designed the logo (based on the Bright's coat motif) for a local walking club, the Maldon and Dengie Hundred Group . The body of small bronzes which she was then accumulating formed the basis of her first and subsequent exhibitions in London at the Whibley Gallery. Her first London one-man show was in 1962 and she exhibited with Whibley at approximately two-year intervals until the gallery closed in 1975.

=== Auction ===
Stern's work is regularly sold at auction.

== Social ==
Stern has lived in Maldon, Essex since the 1970s.

Her interests include walking, cycling, birdwatching, travelling and observing people participating in sports or just looking.

== Family ==
Catharni Stern's family has produced many dedicated to the idea of service to the community. Her unusual name came through a mistake in the transcription of a telegram sent by her father, suggesting that she be called Catharine.

Catharni Stern's father was a reserved and even severe man. He transferred his ministry to the Church of England and become Rector of Brampton. Their son Ernest Hamilton Stern was born in 1886, was educated as a paymaster in the Royal Navy and retired with the rank of captain in 1946.

Her mother was born Mary Christie Underwood. Catharni Stern's relationship with her mother was close and based on an empathy and friendship which overlaid and exceeded the simple mother/child bond. This was in large measure because her mother was vulnerable to a recurrent manic-depressive illness but they all shared a perceptive interest in the creative arts.
