= William Lambarde =

English antiquarian, writer, and politician

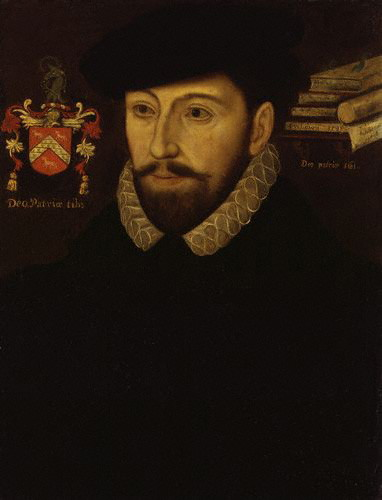
A 16th- or 17th-century portrait of Lambarde by an unidentified artist

William Lambarde (18 October 1536 – 19 August 1601) was an English antiquarian, writer on legal subjects, and politician. He is particularly remembered as the author of A Perambulation of Kent (1576), the first English county history; Eirenarcha (1581), a widely read manual on the office and role of justice of the peace; and Archeion (completed c.1591, though not published until 1635), a discourse that sought to trace the Anglo-Saxon roots of English common law, prerogative and government.

== Early life, education and career ==
William Lambarde was born in London on 18 October 1536. His father John Lambarde was a draper who served three times as Master of the Drapers' Company, an alderman and a sheriff of London. The Manor of Westcombe in Greenwich, demolished in 1725, was their family home.

In 1556, Lambarde was admitted to Lincoln's Inn, where he studied law. In 1568, with Laurence Nowell's encouragement, he published a collection of Anglo-Saxon laws, Archaionomia, which was printed by John Day. In the introduction he acknowledged Nowell's contribution. This publication included a woodcut map ("Lambardes map") depicting the seven kingdoms of Anglo-Saxon England, which is thought to be the first map of any sort to have been designed, printed and published in England, and which is very likely to have been the work of Laurence Nowell.

In 1570, while Lambarde was courting the daughter of George Multon, he completed his Perambulation of Kent, the first English county history. Circulating in manuscript before being printed in 1576, it proved to be very popular, and was published in a second edition in 1596. Lambarde considered writing a similar work for all of Britain, but he set the idea aside when he learned that William Camden was already working on the same project. On 11 September 1570, at age 33, Lambarde married Jane Multon on her 17th birthday. She later died in 1573. He lived in the Manor of St Clere in Ightham. On Laurence Nowell's death, he inherited his books and manuscripts, which may have included the manuscript of Beowulf.

Lambarde probably served as a Member of Parliament for Aldborough in the Parliament of 1563–1567. He was also a bencher of Lincoln's Inn, and a Justice of the Peace for Kent.

Lambarde founded an almshouse in East Greenwich in 1576. He was appointed Keeper of the Rolls by the Lord Chancellor Sir Thomas Egerton in 1597, and Elizabeth made him Keeper of the Records in the Tower in 1601. He died on 19 August that same year. Shortly before his death he had a conversation with Elizabeth in which she commented obliquely on Essex's Rebellion, saying "I am Richard II knowe you not that[?]", and "this tragedie was fortie times plaied in open streetes & howses". Her words are often read as a reference to Shakespeare's Richard II, a performance of which was commissioned by Essex's followers shortly before the rising.

== Works ==
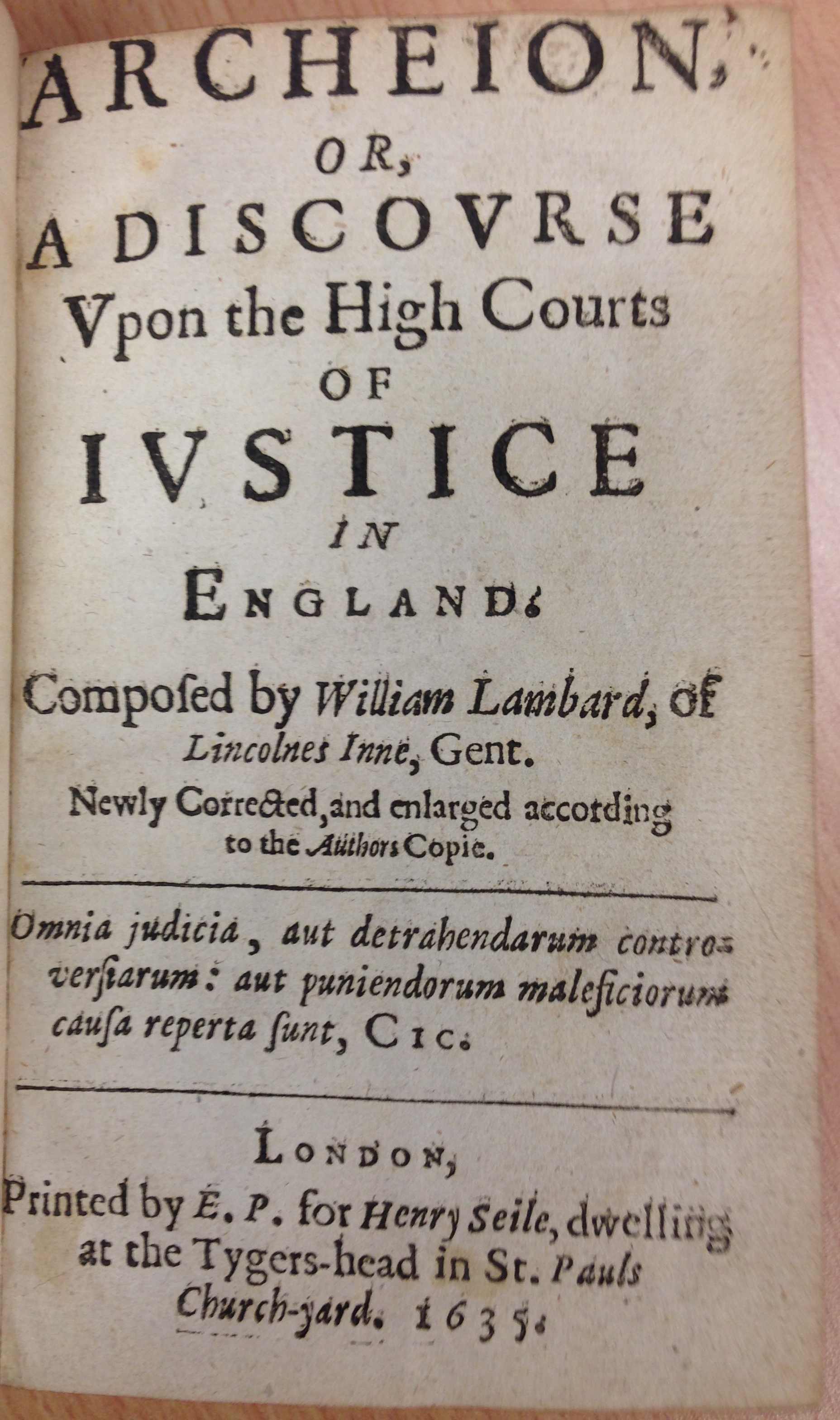
Title page of the first authorized edition of Lambarde's Archeion (1635)

Apart from the works already mentioned, Lambarde wrote Eirenarcha: Or of the Office of the Justices of Peace (1581), a manual that became the standard work on the subject. He later completed Archeion, or, A Discourse upon the High Courts of Justice in England by 1591, another important legal work. The manuscript circulated widely, and a copy was published without consent by the printer Daniel Frere in 1635. In the same year, Lambarde's grandson put out an authorized edition of the work to correct certain errors in Frere's version.

== Legacy ==
There is a Lambarde archive at Drapers' Hall.

The Society of Antiquaries of London oversees the William Lambarde Travel Awards, a programme of travel grants to support antiquarian or archaeological research, named in memory of Lambarde and endowed by a bequest from a descendant, Mrs M. E. Lambarde.
