= Elizabeth Ogborne =

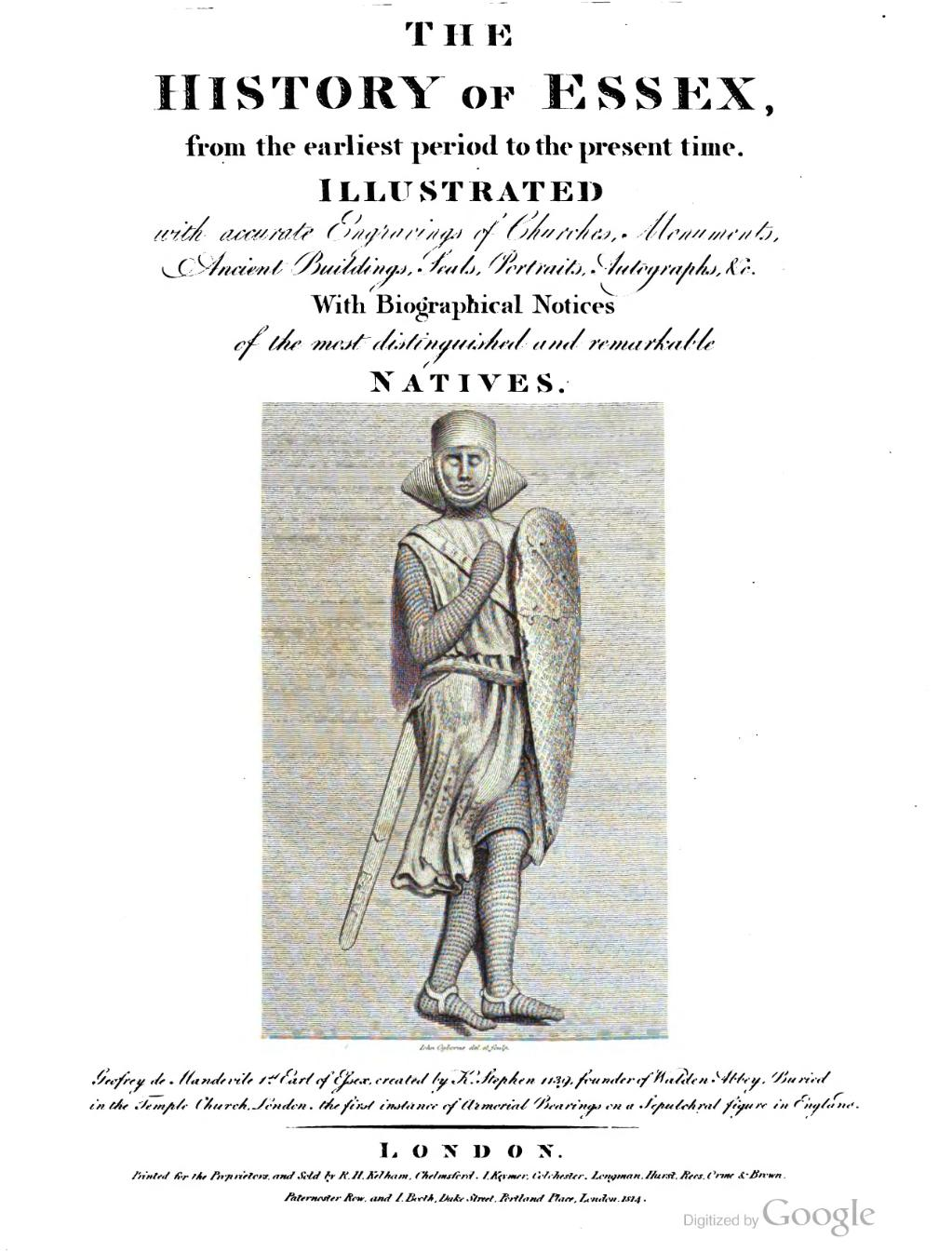
- The History of Essex title page
- Born: 1763 or 4
- Died: 22 December 1853; London

Elizabeth Ogborne (1763/4 – 22 December 1853) was a British antiquary who published an unfinished county history of Essex.

== Life ==
Ogborne claimed that her father was Sir John Eliot, 1st Baronet, but her mother was a dealer in tea and the relationship to Eliot is unproven. She married the engraver John Ogborne on 20 March 1790 at St Pancras. Her new husband and father-in-law were both artists. The couple had one son, John Fauntleroy Ogborne (1793–1813). They lived at 58 Great Portland Street in London, where they were landlords to Euphemia Boswell.

The son, John, qualified as a surgeon, but died in his late teens in 1813; and the couple then took up local history. Elizabeth wrote the first part of a History of Essex, her husband supplying engravings. They were assisted by Thomas Leman and possibly Joseph Strutt. The first – and, as it turned out, only – volume of the History was published in 1817. The book received good reviews in the Gentleman's Magazine, and Ogborne was commended for her learning and precision. However, sales were poor, and the couple ended their days living on charity. Ogborne died in London in 1853.
