= Tony Allen =

Tony Allen may refer to:

== Music ==
- Tony Allen (musician) (1940–2020), Nigerian drummer with Fela Kuti and one of the founders of Afrobeat
- Tony Allen, member of American doo-wop group The Furys
- Tony Allen, Irish singer, member of Irish duo Foster and Allen with Mick Foster
- Tony Allen, recording alias of J.W. Hodkinson (1942–2013), English rock singer

== Others ==
- Tony Allen (footballer) (1939–2022), English footballer
- Tony Allen (comedian) (1945–2023), English comedian and writer
- Tony Allen (basketball) (born 1982), American former basketball player
- Tony Allen (academic administrator), president of the Delaware State University

== See also ==
- Tony Allan (disambiguation)
- Anthony Allen (disambiguation)
