= HMS Harwich (1674) =

Ship of the line of the Royal Navy

History

England
- Name: HMS Harwich
- Ordered: 1672
- Builder: Deane, Harwich
- Launched: 1674
- Commissioned: 1675
- Fate: Wrecked, 1691

General characteristics
- Class & type: 70-gun third rate ship of the line
- Tons burthen: 993 tons
- Length: 123 ft 9 in (37.72 m) (keel)
- Beam: 38 ft 10 in (11.84 m)
- Depth of hold: 15 ft 8 in (4.78 m)
- Propulsion: Sails
- Sail plan: Full-rigged ship
- Armament: 70 guns of various weights of shot

HMS Harwich was a 70-gun third rate ship of the line of the English Royal Navy, built by Sir Anthony Deane at Harwich and launched in 1674. By 1685 she was carrying only 64 guns.

Harwich was wrecked on 3 September 1691 off of Mount Edgecombe, Plymouth. Her salvage rights were sold to Joseph Bingham on 20 February 1693.
