= Thomas Jekyll =

English antiquarian

- Born: 12 January 1570; St. Helen, Bishopsgate, London
- Died: 1653 (aged 82–83); Bocking, Essex
- Occupation: Antiquarian

Thomas Jekyll (12 January 1570 – 1653) was an English antiquarian.

== Biography ==
Jekyll was born in the parish of St. Helen, Bishopsgate, London, on 12 January 1570, was eldest son of John Stocker Jekyll of Newington, Middlesex, by Mary, daughter and heiress of Nicholas Barnehouse of Wellington, Somerset (Visitations of Essex, Harl. Soc., pt. i. pp. 427–8; Morant, Essex, Preface). He became an attorney of Clifford's Inn, and was afterwards made secondary of the king's bench and one of the clerks of the papers. He died at his country seat at Bocking, Essex, in 1653 (Administration Act, P. C. C., dated 13 May 1653). By his wife Elizabeth, daughter of Richard Lake of ‘Norton Horny’ (? Galby) Place, Leicestershire, who survived him, he had five sons and three daughters.

Availing himself of his access to legal records, Jekyll filled above forty volumes with valuable materials for the histories of Essex, Norfolk, and Suffolk (Gough, British Topography, i. 345). A portion of the Jekyll collection was included in the list of manuscripts belonging to John Ouseley, rector of Springfield, Essex, printed in the ‘Catalogi Librorum Manuscriptorum Angliæ,’ 1697 (ii. 103). After Ouseley's death these manuscripts came into the hands of the Rev. William Holbrook, his son-in-law, who in 1710 was willing to sell them to Harley, earl of Oxford (cf. Harl. MS. 3779). Other of Jekyll's papers passed to Jekyll's grandson, Nicholas Jekyll of Castle Hedingham, Essex. Holbrook is said to have subsequently communicated his part of the collection to William Holman, who obtained additions from Nicholas Jekyll. Of two manuscript catalogues of the Jekyll MSS., drawn up by Holman in 1715, one is now in the library of All Souls' College, Oxford (No. 297), and the other is in the British Museum (Egerton MS. 2382, f. 153). Many of Jekyll's volumes ultimately found their way into the British Museum (see Harl. MSS. 3968, 4723, 5185, 5186, 5190, 5195, 6677, 6678, 6684, and 6685; various papers inserted in Harl. MSS. 6832 and 7017), and five folio volumes, containing very valuable materials for the history of Essex (Add. MSS. 19985–9). Morant by his own account had in his possession those Jekyll MSS. which had belonged to Ouseley, and made copious use of them (Nichols, Lit. Anecd. ii. 705).

An interesting letter from Jekyll to Sir Symonds D'Ewes, dated from Bocking on 19 Dec. 1641, is in Harleian MS. 376.
