= John Brewster (author) =

English author and clergyman (1753–1842)

John Brewster (1753–1842) was an English author and clergyman.

== Life ==
Brewster was the son of the Rev. Richard Brewster, M.A., vicar of Heighington in County Durham. He received his education at the grammar school of Newcastle upon Tyne under Hugh Moises, and at Lincoln College, Oxford, where he graduated B.A. in 1775, and M.A. in 1778. He was appointed curate of Stockton-on-Tees in 1776, and lecturer there in 1777. In 1791 he was presented to the vicarage of Greatham, benefice he held until 1799, when he became vicar of Stockton through the patronage of Bishop Shute Barrington. Barrington later preferred him to the rectories of Redmarshall in 1805, Boldon in 1809, and Egglescliffe in 1814.

He died at Egglescliffe 28 November 1842, aged 89.

== Works ==
His chief work was his Parochial History and Antiquities of Stockton-upon-Tees published at Stockton in 1796. A second and enlarged edition was printed in 1829.

His other works include:

- Sermons for Prisons &c (1790).
- On the Prevention of Crimes and the Advantages of Solitary Confinement (1790).
- Meditations of a Recluse, chiefly on Religious Subjects (1800).
- A Thanksgiving Sermon for the Peace (1802).
- A Secular Essay, containing a View of Events connected with the Ecclesiastical History of England during the 18th Century (1802).
- The Restoration of Family Worship recommended, in Discourses selected, with alterations, from Dr. Doddridge (1804) .
- Lectures on the Acts of the Apostles(1806, 2 vols)..
- Of the Religious Improvement of Prisons, an Assize Sermon (1808).
- Meditations for the Aged, adapted to the Progress of Human Life (1810 four editions).
- Meditations for Penitents (1813).
- Reflections adapted to the Holy Seasons of the Christian and Ecclesiastical Year.
- Reflections upon the Ordination Service.
- Contemplations on the Last Discourses of our Blessed Saviour with His Disciples as recorded in the Gospel of St. John, (1822).
- A Sketch of the History of Churches in England, applied to the purposes of the Society for Promoting the Building and Enlargement of Churches and Chapels (1818).
- An Abridgment of Cave's Primitive Christianity.
- Memoir of the Rev. Hugh Moises, A.M; privately printed in 1823, and reprinted in Nichols's Illustrations of Literature, vol. v.
