= John Bowen (antiquary) =

English painter and antiquary

John Bowen (1756 – 19 June 1832) was an English painter, genealogist and antiquarian.

== Life ==
Bowen was the eldest son of James Bowen, painter and topographer, of Shrewsbury, where the younger Bowen was born. Bowen studied local antiquities under his father; traced out the pedigrees of Shropshire families, and became skilful in deciphering and copying ancient manuscripts. He died on 19 June 1832, aged 76.

== Works ==
In 1795 he sent a drawing of the Droitwich town seal to the Gentleman's Magazine, signing himself 'Antiquarius;' and in 1802 he followed this up with another communication, to which he put his initials. He drew four views of Shrewsbury, which were engraved by Vandergucht (Gough, Topography, ii. 177), and in the Philosophical Transactions is a plate of some Roman inscriptions from his hand.
