= John Collinson (historian) =

John Collinson FSA (19 July 1757 – 27 August 1793) was an English clergyman, antiquarian and historian. He is best known for his three-volume history of Somerset which he published at the age of 34, two years before his death, and which earned him the title of "the Somerset historian".

== Life ==
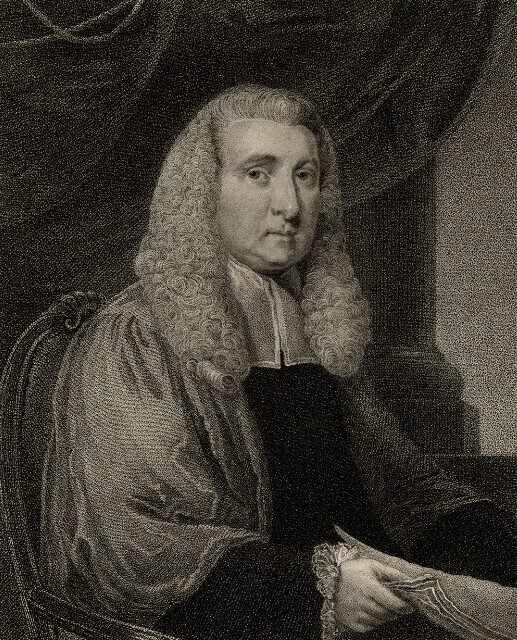
Daines Barrington, who backed Collinson for election to Fellowship of the Society of Antiquaries of London in 1784.

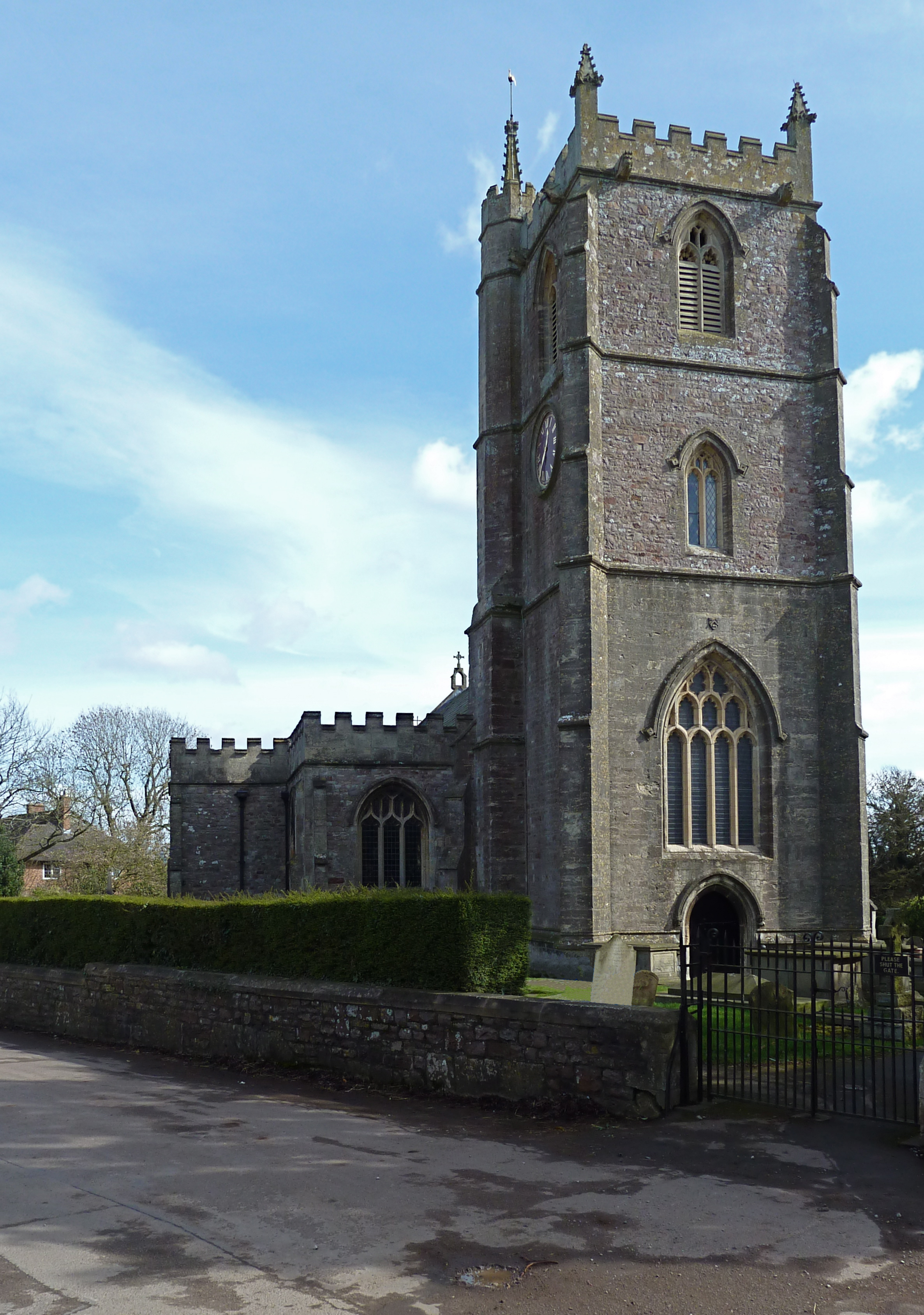
All Saints Church, Long Ashton, Somerset, of which Collinson became vicar in 1787

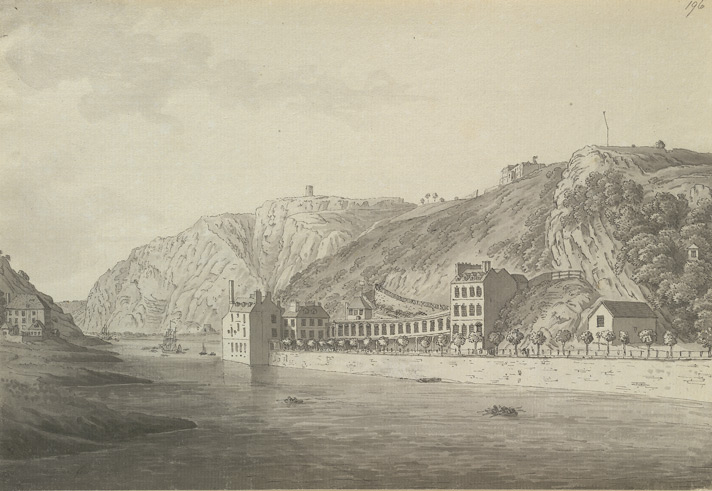
Hotwells, Bristol, where John Collinson died at the age of 36 after a lingering illness on 27 August 1793.

Collinson was the son of the Rev. John Collinson of Bromham, Wiltshire, where he was born on 19 July 1757. He matriculated at Brasenose College, Oxford in 1775, but did not complete a degree course. He was ordained deacon in 1779 with the sponsorship of the Rev. Thomas Meyler (c.1718–1786), having made further studies at The Queen's College, Oxford. He was then curate to Meyler in 1780 at Marlborough.

Collinson moved to Cirencester where in 1781 he married. In 1782 he was appointed vicar of Clanfield, Oxfordshire. At this period he published one book, and issued proposals for county histories, firstly of Wiltshire and then of Somerset. He associated with the antiquarians Joseph Kilner and Samuel Rudder, and in 1784 was elected a Fellow of the Society of Antiquaries of London, backed by Daines Barrington, William Boys and Edward Hasted.

In 1787 Collinson became vicar of Long Ashton and perpetual curate of Filton (alias Whitchurch) in Somerset. He died at Hotwells, Bristol on 27 August 1793, and was buried at Long Ashton.

== History of Somerset ==
Collinson's magnum opus was his History and Antiquities of the County of Somerset, which bears the date 1791 on its title pages although it did not in fact appear until 1792.

The work made use of the standard antiquarian and historical works, as the title page acknowledges, and partially included a survey by Edmund Rack of Bath. An initial difficulty was met when the expected access to the papers of John Strachey was not granted. The history is neatly organised by parish and hundred.

While the history was heavily criticised for a lack of original research in the Gentleman's Magazine on publication, it has subsequently been widely acknowledged as an ingenious work that made substantial advances in Domesday nomenclature, and contains valuable records of church monument inscriptions, many of which have since been lost. That it is in large part a skilful collation and synthesis of existing historical sources, supported by some research and a deep first-hand knowledge of the county, was acknowledged by Collinson in his introduction. It must be remembered that Collinson was only 24 years old when he issued proposals for the history, and only 34 years old when it was published; extensive original research was neither claimed nor could reasonably be expected.

Collinson's immense, historically important achievement was freely acknowledged almost a century later by Robert William Eyton who praised the historian's topographical knowledge, scholarship, utmost precision and constancy. Perhaps the greatest proof of its merit is that Collinson's work has remained the standard history of Somerset for almost two centuries, and is only now being superseded by the Victoria County History of Somerset, still in progress, of which the published volumes reference Collinson extensively throughout.

A separate index volume to Collinson's history was prepared and published by the Revs. Frederic William Weaver and E. H. Bates just over a century later in 1898, which greatly facilitates the use of the work as well as updating and standardising the spelling of place names.

== List of works ==
- The Beauties of British Antiquity: selected from the writings of esteemed antiquaries with notes and observations, 1779.
- History and Antiquities of the County of Somerset, Collected from Authentick Records and an Actual Survey made by the late Mr Edmund Rack. Adorned with a Map of the County and Engravings of Roman and other Reliques, Town-Seals, Baths, Churches and Gentlemen's Seats, in 3 volumes, published at Bath, Somerset, 1791:
  - Volume 1, Bath, 1791
  - Volume 2, Bath, 1791
  - Volume 3, Bath, 1791

== Family ==
Collinson married Mary Hill in Cirencester on 25 March 1781. She died in 1787, leaving him a son John (b. 16 April 1782). He married as his second wife, Harriot Harris, on 7 July 1788 at Clifton, believed to be a near relation of John Harris who was a subscriber to the History of Somerset. There was no surviving issue of this marriage.

Collinson died after a lingering illness on 27 August 1793. In his will, made on 10 April 1793 and proved on 8 January 1798, he left all his books, manuscripts, drawings, prints, collection of coins and antiquities to his son, John Collinson, apart from the plates engraved for the History of Somerset, in the hands of bookseller Charles Dilly and in his estimation valued between two and three hundred pounds, which were left to his mother, Elizabeth Collinson. He also left a legacy to his sister, Elizabeth Collinson, of a ring and thirty pounds to be raised from the sale of the copyright of the History of Somerset. The residue of his estate was to go to his wife. However at the administration of the will in 1798, Timothy Stevens, a bookseller of Cirencester and one of the original subscribers to the History of Somerset, came forward as a creditor and was granted all of Collinson's goods and chattels.

By 1798 Collinson's widow, Harriot, had married John Francis Hamm of Little Chelsea, Middlesex, who was the chief legatee of his uncle John Manning, a wealthy West Indies merchant. Harriot died at St Anne's Place, Cambridge Heath, London, on 21 December 1846.
