= J Anthony Allen =

American composer and producer (born 1978)

Jason Anthony Allen
- Born: Jason Anthony Allen; January 18, 1978 (age 48); United States
- Education: Grand Valley State University (BA), Peabody Conservatory (MM), University of Minnesota (PhD)
- Occupations: Composer, producer, educator, entrepreneur
- Organizations: Slam Academy (Founder), American Composers Forum (Former Board Member), Ion Concert Media (Co-founder)
- Known for: Electronic music, concert music, music education
- Notable work: Aniscorcia, Conic Arias
- Awards: Prix D'Été, Macht Orchestral Prize, P. Bruce Blair Award, Distinguished Young Alumni Award (Grand Valley State University)
- Website: www.jasonallenmusic.com

Jason Anthony Allen (born January 18, 1978) is an American composer and producer. His career has focused on electronic music and concert music. Allen’s works have been presented on national and international stages. In 2014 he was a quarter-finalist for the Grammy Foundation Music Educator Award, he founded Slam Academy in 2011, and he has been a college music educator at numerous colleges and universities.

== Career ==
Allen is an American composer, producer, songwriter, engineer, and entrepreneur. He sat on the board of the American Composers Forum. He is an orchestra composer, with works for the Minnesota Orchestra as well as electronic artist, with works developed for film, TV, and radio. Most recently, he has focused on producing music for video games, and on UX (user experience) sound design.

Allen’s work has been experienced throughout the United States, where it has been called "a study in ominous sound and motion," “An aural hallucinogen,” and “A beautiful and engaging use of technology.” His music has also been heard across Europe, including Denmark, the Netherlands, Hungary, the Czech Republic, France and Italy.

Allen’s work in electronic music is influenced by his early training in classical and avant-garde music. He has presented at the International Computer Music Conference, and Society for ElectroAcoustic Music in the United States (SEAMUS) national conferences, Society of Composers (SCI) national student conference, Electronic Music Midwest festivals, Spark Festivals of Electronic Music and Art, (Minneapolis), Music at the Anthology festival (MATA Festival, New York City), June in Buffalo Festival, and the Aspen Music Festival and School, for which he received the Susan and Ford Schumann Award in 2004 and 2005. Allen has also worked in electronic performance, performing extensively both as a guitarist and on a set of “glove” controllers, which he has designed, built, and programmed by himself. He has performed at the Guitar Foundation of America National Conference, given numerous solo concerts and recitals, as well as professional studio work. He has performed on electronic devices on several occasions including performances with members of the Zeitgeist Contemporary Music Ensemble, in New York City at the MATA festival, Miami, Florida, Minneapolis, Minnesota. He has also given numerous performances with the group Ballet Mech, of which he is one of the founders.

Allen has many collaborative outlets. Currently, his primary collaborative vehicle is the group Ballet Mech; this trio of producers recently released “Graveyards,” which remixes Jeremy Messersmith’s “The Reluctant Graveyard.” Allen is also in leadership roles in organizations dedicated to electronic music and education: he was conference director for SEAMUS 2013, and he was the assistant director and lead producer of the Spark Festival of Electronic Music and Art from 2003 to 2009. Allen taught sound design and composition at McNally Smith College of Music in St. Paul, MN, and he is currently on the faculty of Augsburg University where he teachers music, media, and management. He is founder and owner of Slam Academy, a multimedia educational space in downtown Minneapolis where he also teaches courses on Ableton Live, Max for Live, and other software.

== Background, education and awards ==
Born and raised in Michigan, Allen completed a BA in Music from Grand Valley State University before moving to Baltimore, Maryland to attend the Peabody Conservatory of Music. At Peabody he earned concurrent master's degrees in Electronic Music and Music Composition. His orchestral works have been performed by the Minnesota Orchestra, Aspen Conductors Orchestra, and Peabody Conservatory Orchestra. These compositions have received the Prix D'Ete award (first prize, Peabody Conservatory), Macht Orchestral Prize and P. Bruce Blair Award (Peabody Conservatory). In 2008, he was awarded the Distinguished Young Alumni award from his alma mater, Grand Valley State University. In 2011, Allen earned a PhD in Music Composition (with a minor in Visual Arts) from the University of Minnesota; his supervisors were Judith Lang Zaimont and Douglas Geers. He has also studied electro-acoustic music at the Centre de Création of Music Iannis Xenakis (CCMIX) in Paris, France. Allen's career of academic teaching and publishing runs parallel to his work as a composer, and multi-media artist. Paper publications have appeared in Organised Sound (Cambridge University Press), The Living Music Journal, Proceedings of the third annual Spark Festival, and ComposersOnline.Org. Before joining the faculty at McNally Smith, Allen held teaching appointments at The University of Amsterdam (Amsterdam, Netherlands), the University of Minnesota, and the Computer Music Department of the Peabody Conservatory of Music of the Johns Hopkins University (Baltimore, MD). He has also taught classical, jazz, folk and rock guitar at academies and institutions throughout the Midwest.

== Current and past projects ==
=== Ballet Mech ===
Ballet Mech began in 2004 as a collaboration with fellow composer Noah Keesecker. The group seeks new ways to incorporate technology into performance. Allen originally performed on his “data gloves” and Keesecker on “modified Trumpet”, both controlling audio and video. For a time, they added a bassist and drummer. Entering a third phase of the group, Allen and Keesecker added vocalist and composer Joshua Clausen. This group focused on exploring how their ensemble could fit into popular music. In addition to performances at national conferences, this iteration of the group had a successful run of local bar shows in the Minneapolis area. The fourth and current phase of the group removed performance from the equation. The current group consists only of Allen, Keesecker, and Clausen, and focuses on production of large projects. In 2010 they were featured in a production at Macalester College (St. Paul, MN) having re-composed the soundtrack to Marat/Sade. In 2012 they released a remix album of Minneapolis Singer/Songwriter Jeremy Messersmith, titled Graveyard.

=== Slam Academy ===
Allen started Slam Academy in 2011 along with fellow electronic musician James Patrick, after finding that there were few reasonable opportunities for adults to learn electronic music affordably in the Twin Cities. By 2025, the school has served over 5000 students in programs including classes in their Minneapolis space, online classes, free events, and concerts. Currently, Allen has left the company to pursue his own private teaching career, leaving James Patrick as the CEO and single owner of the company.

=== Solo albums ===
Allen has released two albums of solo work: Aniscorcia (2015) Conic Arias (2016)

=== Ion Concert Media ===
Allen is one of the founders of Ion Concert Media - a company working to integrate video fluidly into live concert performance. Allen has contributed to multiple patents for the company.
