= Nathaniel Salmon =

New Zealand gridiron football player (born 2004)

Profile
- Position: Tight end

Personal information
- Born: 12 February 2004 (age 22)
- Listed height: 6 ft 5 in (1.96 m)
- Listed weight: 245 lb (111 kg)

Career information
- High school: Mana College (Porirua, New Zealand)

Other information
- Basketball career

Career information
- Playing career: 2022–present
- Position: Forward

Career history
- 2022: Manawatu Jets
- 2023: Wellington Saints
- 2024: North Gold Coast Seahawks

Nathaniel Salmon (born 12 February 2004) is a New Zealand American football tight end and basketball player. He played in the National Basketball League (NBL) for the Manawatu Jets and Wellington Saints. He is a participant in the National Football League's International Player Pathway (IPP) program.

== Early life and basketball career ==
Salmon was born on 12 February 2004. He grew up in Takapūwāhia, Porirua, New Zealand. Each of his four siblings played basketball, and Salmon is also related to National Basketball League (NBL) players Jordan Ngatai, Francis Mulvihill, and Randall Bishop. As a youth, he played for the junior national team, the Tall Blacks. He attended Mana College in Porirua.

After Salmon graduated from high school, he decided to turn professional at the age of 17, signing with the NBL's Manawatu Jets in February 2022. He appeared in 15 games during the 2021–22 season and averaged 5.3 points and 1.9 rebounds. Towards the end of the year, he played for a 3×3 team affiliated with the Wellington Saints, and in March 2023 he signed with the Saints. He appeared in two games during the 2022–23 season. In 2024, he moved to Australia and began playing for the second-tier North Gold Coast Seahawks, where he averaged 15.7 points and 5.1 rebounds while appearing in 15 games.

== Football career ==
Salmon had little interest in American football growing up, occasionally watching portions of the Super Bowl in some years. By mid-2024, he had never touched a football. However, that year, he was noticed and invited to the National Football League (NFL) academy in Gold Coast, where he impressed. Later in December, he was selected as one of 14 players for the NFL's International Player Pathway (IPP) program. He began training at the position of tight end and was invited to train in the U.S. at IMG Academy for 10 weeks in early 2025.
