= David Ogborne =

David Ogborne (died 1800 or 1801) was an English artist. He depicted local events and curiosities in his home county Essex.

== Life ==
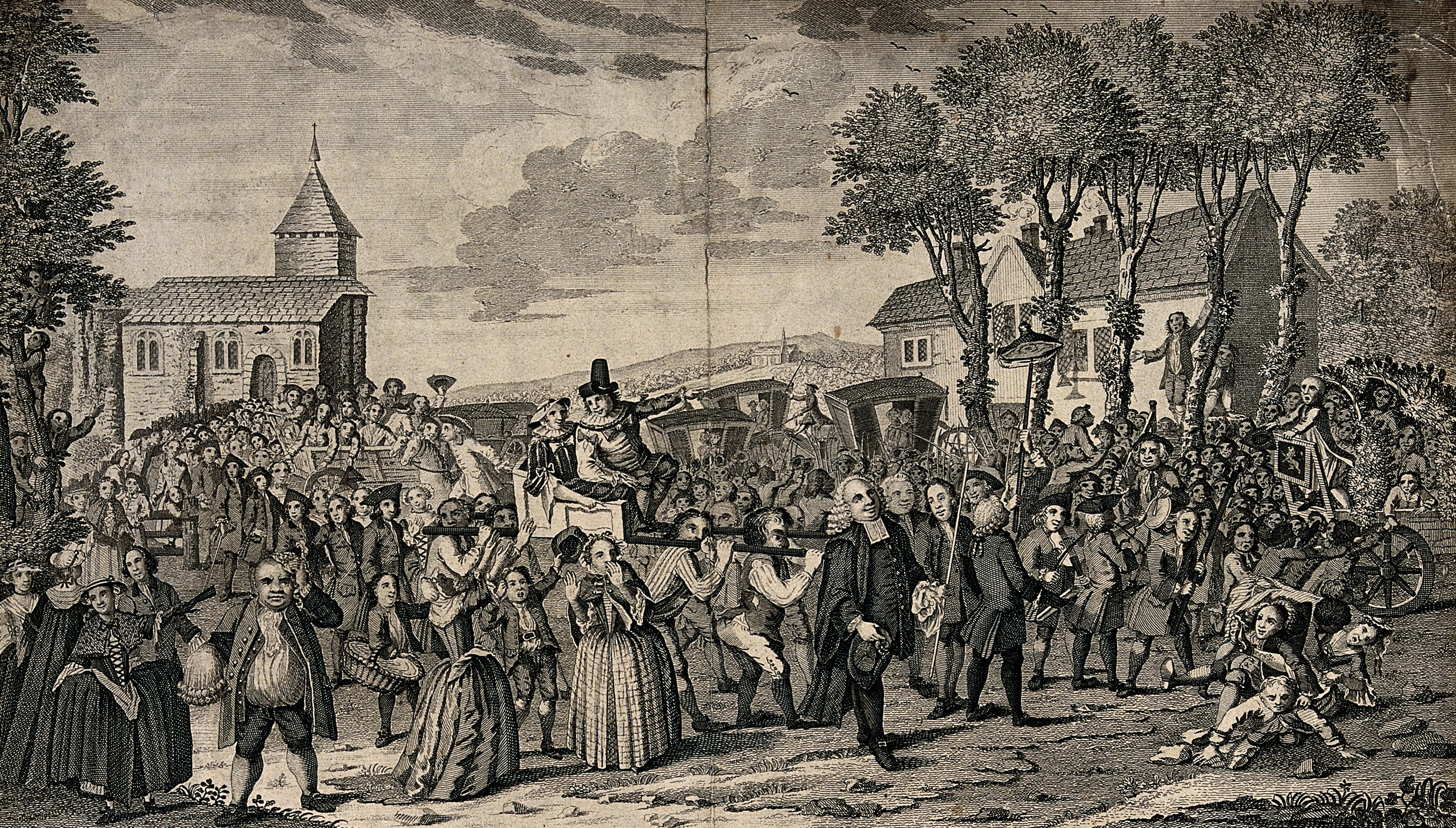
Engraving by C. Mosley of Ogborne's painting of the "flitch of bacon" ceremony in Great Dunmow

Ogborne married and settled before 1740 in Chelmsford, Essex, where he is described in the register as a "painter" or "limner". He gained a certain reputation by his portraits of local provincial monsters, such as a winged fish taken at Battlebridge, and a calf with six legs produced at Great Baddow; but he painted also a portrait of Edward Bright, a grocer of Maldon, Essex, who weighed 43½ stone. This portrait was engraved by James MacArdell, and published on 1 January 1750, Another of his portraits was of Thomas Wood, the miller of Billericay.

Ogborne is better known as the artist of "An exact Perspective View of Dunmow, late the Priory in the County of Essex. With a Representation of the Ceremony and Procession in that Manor, on Thursday the 20 June 1751. Engraved from an Original Painting taken on the Spot by David Ogborne, published January 1752. Engraved by C. Mosley". This presents the flitch of bacon custom in Great Dunmow, and shows in the foreground a portrait, more or less caricatured, of the then vicar of Dunmow. Another Essex print by Ogborne is "A Perspective View of the County Town of Chelmsford in Essex. With the Judges Procession on the Day Entrance attended by the High Sheriff and his Officers", published on 2 August 1762, engraved by T. Ryland.

Ogborne also wrote some poetry and plays. Of these the only piece printed was The Merry Midnights Mistake, or Comfortable Conclusion: a new Comedy. "Chelmsford printed and sold for the author by T. Loft" (1765). The prologue and epilogue are by George Saville Carey. The piece was produced, with indifferent success, by a company of ladies and gentlemen at the Saracen's Head Inn, Chelmsford.

He died in Chelmsford, and was buried at the churchyard on 6 January 1801.

Ogborne and his first wife Ruth had four sons and three daughters. John Ogborne, the engraver, is thought to be the son of Charles Ogborne and his second wife.
