= Nicholas Darnell (cricketer) =

English cricketer, barrister and Catholic priest

Personal information
- Full name: Nicholas Darnell
- Born: 18 November 1817; Stockton-on-Tees, County Durham, England
- Died: 8 April 1892 (aged 74); Clifton, Bristol, England
- Batting: Unknown
- Bowling: Unknown

Domestic team information
- Years: Team
- 1837–1840: Oxford University

Career statistics
Competition	First-class
Matches	9
Runs scored	25
Batting average	2.27
100s/50s	–/–
Top score	5
Balls bowled	?
Wickets	28
Bowling average	?
5 wickets in innings	1
10 wickets in match	–
Best bowling	6/?
Catches/stumpings	5/–
- Source: Cricinfo, 17 February 2020

Nicholas Darnell (18 November 1817 – 8 April 1892) was an English first-class cricketer, barrister and Catholic priest.

The son of William Nicholas Darnell, he was born at Stockton-on-Tees in November 1817. He was educated at Winchester College, before going up to Exeter College, Oxford in 1836. While studying at Oxford, he made his debut in first-class cricket for the Gentlemen in the Gentlemen v Players fixture of 1836. The following year, he made his debut for Oxford University against the Marylebone Cricket Club and played first-class matches for Oxford until 1840, making a total of eight appearances. Playing as a bowler, Darnell took 28 wickets in his nine first-class matches, taking a five wicket haul once for Oxford University in 1840.

He was elected a fellow of New College, Oxford in 1837, holding the post until 1847. A member of Lincoln's Inn from 1844, Darnell was a practicing barrister. He converted to Catholicism in 1847 and later undertook ecclesiastical duties as a Catholic priest. Darnell died in April 1892 at Clifton, Bristol.
