= Silas Taylor =

English army officer

Silas Taylor (16 July 1624–4 November 1678) was an English army officer of the Parliamentarian forces, known also as an antiquary and musical composer.

== Life ==
The son of Silvanus Taylor, a parliamentary committee-man for Herefordshire and supporter of Oliver Cromwell, he was born at Harley, near Much Wenlock, Shropshire, on 16 July 1624. Anthony Wood calls him Domville or D'omville by surname, but it is not clear that Taylor ever used that name himself. After Shrewsbury School, he entered New Inn Hall, Oxford, at the beginning of 1641.

Taylor left Oxford to join the parliamentary army, in which he bore a captain's commission under Edward Massey. After the First English Civil War he became, by his father's influence, a sequestrator in Herefordshire. Initially the position was joint with Captain Benjamin Mason; after a sharp quarrel over the details of distraining money, and the accounts, Taylor emerged as the sole holder of the office. He was accommodating to the local gentry.

At the Restoration of 1660, Taylor had to rely on patronage. Sir Edward Harley, appointed governor of Dunkirk in June of that year, took Taylor with him in the capacity of commissary for ammunition. He returned to London in 1663, out of work for nearly two years. Sir Paul Neile with others found him the keepership of naval stores at Harwich. He held the post until his death, which took place on 4 November 1678 at age 54. He was buried in the chancel of Harwich Church.

== Collector ==
Under the Commonwealth Taylor had access to the cathedral libraries of Hereford and Worcester for manuscripts; from the latter he copied an original grant of King Edgar dated 964, printed in John Selden's Mare Clausum. Allegations of the time that he misappropriated the contents on a large scale are now rejected.

Taylor left his collections for a history of Herefordshire at Brampton Bryan, the seat of Sir Edward Harley in the county; some went to the Harleian collection. His collections relating to Harwich fell into the hands of Samuel Dale, by whom they were published under the title of The History and Antiquities of Harwich and Dovercourt, … first collected by Silas Taylor alias Domville … and now much enlarged … in all its parts, with notes and observations relating to Natural History … by Samuel Dale, London, 1730 (second edition) 1732. The manuscript had been previously made use of by Edmund Gibson for his edition of William Camden's Britannia, by Richard Newcourt for Repertorium Ecclesiasticum, and by Thomas Cox for Magna Britannia. John Duncumb later used it for his Collections towards the History and Antiquities of the County of Hereford (1804).

Taylor died in debt, and his remaining collections were sold by his creditors.

== Works ==
The only work Taylor published under his own name was The History of Gavel-Kind, with the etymology thereof … With some observations upon many … occurrences of British and English History. To which is added a short history of William the Conqueror, written in Latin by an anonymous author, i. 2 pts. London, 1663; the Latin tract had been passed to Taylor from the Bodleian Library by Thomas Barlow. He dated gavelkind to an earlier period than William Somner. Magnus Imposter was an anonymous attack on Richard Delamaine the younger. Taylor, his father and John Tombes took against Delamaine for religious and personal reasons, and some linked to the local politics of the quarrel with Benjamin Mason and Wroth Rogers.

Taylor left a manuscript play with Samuel Pepys for his opinion. He knew musicians: the Playfords, Henry Purcell the elder, and Matthew Locke. Two of his own compositions were published in John Playford's Court Ayres, London, 1655. Pepys heard an anthem of Taylor's performed in the Chapel Royal.

== Notes ==
Attribution

This article incorporates text from a publication now in the public domain: Stephen, Leslie, ed. (1888). "Domville, Silas". Dictionary of National Biography. Vol. 15. London: Smith, Elder & Co.
