= Thomas Leman =

English antiquarian

- Born: 29 March 1751; Kirstead, Norfolk, England
- Died: 17 March 1826 (aged 74); Bath, Somerset, England
- Occupation: Antiquarian

Thomas Leman (29 March 1751 – 17 March 1826) was an English antiquarian.

== Biography ==
Leman was born at Kirstead, Norfolk, on 29 March 1751, was the son of the Rev. John Leman, of Wenhaston Hall, Suffolk, by Anne, daughter of Clement Reynolds of Cambridge. He entered Emmanuel College, Cambridge, as a pensioner, on 15 September 1770, was afterwards fellow commoner, and graduated B.A. in 1774. He was chosen fellow of Clare Hall, took holy orders, proceeded M.A. in 1778, and was readmitted to Emmanuel on 9 November 1783 as a Dixie (bye) fellow. At Emmanuel, he formed a lasting friendship with William Bennet, afterwards bishop of Cloyne. Bennet conferred on him the chancellorship of Cloyne in May 1796, which he was compelled to resign in 1802, on account of non-residence. In 1788 he was elected F.S.A. With Bennet, he visited every Roman and British road and station in Great Britain, and liberally communicated his observations to county historians. To John Nichols, he presented an essay 'On the Roman Roads and Stations in Leicestershire'; for Robert Clutterbuck he wrote a memoir concerning 'the primæval inhabitants in Hertfordshire, and the roads and earthworks which formerly existed in it, whether of British or Roman origin'; to Robert Surtees he sent some observations on the Roman and British state of Durham, accompanied by plans of roads and stations; for Sir R. C. Hoare he constructed some maps for his edition of Giraldus's 'Itinerary of Archbishop Baldwin through Wales;' and to Elizabeth Ogborne he communicated the 'slight sketch of the Antiquities of Essex' which is prefixed to her 'History of Essex' (pp. i–iv). He likewise furnished much information concerning British and Roman antiquities to Lysons's 'Magna Britannia,' and J. N. Brewer's 'Introduction to the Beauties of England and Wales.' Along with Archdeacon Coxe, he assisted Sir R. C. Hoare in planning the 'History of Ancient Wiltshire.' He believed firmly in the genuineness of the 'Itinerary' of Richard of Cirencester, [and see Bertram, Charles], and the edition of that modern forgery published in 1809, with a translation and commentary, was chiefly prepared by him.

Leman died at Bath on 17 March 1826, and was buried at Walcot. He married, first, on 4 Jan. 1796, Frances (d. 1818), daughter and heiress of William Nind, barrister, and widow of Colonel Alexander Champion of Bath; and secondly, in January 1819, Frances, daughter of Sir Robert Deane, bart., and widow of Colonel John Hodges, who survived him, but he had no children by either.

He was a founder and original trustee of the Bath Institution, and left to it thirteen folio volumes of genealogical collections arranged in counties, together with some valuable antiquarian books annotated by himself. Two volumes of Wiltshire pedigrees and a volume of notes on Roman and British roads and stations were bequeathed by him to Sir R. C. Hoare.
