= John Duncumb =

English clergyman and antiquary

- Born: 1765
- Died: 19 September 1839 (aged 73–74); Hereford
- Known for: Antiquary

John Duncumb (1765 – 19 September 1839) (occasionally spelled Duncomb) was an English clergyman and antiquary. He is best known as the author of an unfinished county history of Herefordshire (published 1804–12).

== Life ==
Duncumb was the second son of Thomas Duncumb, rector of Shere, Surrey. He was educated at a school in Guildford, under a clergyman named Cole; and at Trinity College, Cambridge. He graduated B.A. in 1787, and proceeded M.A. in 1796. In 1788 he settled in Hereford, acting as both editor and printer of Charles Pugh's Hereford Journal.

Duncumb's journalistic career ended in 1791, when he was ordained. He was instituted to the rectory of Talachddu, near Brecon, in 1793; and to Frilsham, Berkshire, in the same year. In 1809 he became vicar of Tortington, Sussex, but resigned the living soon afterwards on his institution as rector of Abbey Dore, Herefordshire (the Duke of Norfolk being patron of both benefices). In 1815 he obtained the vicarage of Mansel Lacy, Herefordshire, from Uvedale Price, and he continued to hold both livings – Abbey Dore and Mansel Lacy – until his death.

Duncumb was secretary to the Herefordshire Agricultural Society from its formation in 1797, and in 1801 he published an Essay on the Best Means of Applying Pasture Lands, etc., to the Production to Grain, and of reconverting them to Grass. Another treatise was a General View of the Agriculture of the County of Hereford (1805), written for the consideration of the Board of Agriculture and Internal Improvement. He also published two sermons, one preached on 9 March 1796 (the day appointed for a general fast); the other preached in Hereford Cathedral on 3 August 1796, at the annual meeting of the subscribers to the Hereford General Infirmary (printed in 1797 for the benefit of the charity). By 1809 he had been elected a fellow of the Society of Antiquaries. He also served as a magistrate for Herefordshire.

Duncumb was never resident in any of his various parishes, but lived from 1788 until his death in Hereford.

== Death ==
Duncumb died in Hereford on 19 September 1839, aged 74. He was buried in Dore Abbey, where a monument still exists.

His manuscript collections were sold by his widow to a local bookseller.

== Herefordshire county history ==
=== Duncumb's project ===
In 1790, Duncumb accepted an invitation from Charles, Duke of Norfolk, owner (through his wife) of extensive estates in the county, to compile and edit a county history of Herefordshire. The terms were £2 2s. per week for collecting materials, with extra payment for journeys out of the county, the work to become the property of the Duke. The Duke had bought several collections of antiquarian material relating to the history of the county, and Duncumb drew on these, and on his own researches in the British Museum, Bodleian Library, Tower of London and elsewhere. He also distributed questionnaires, but received few returns.

The first volume of the Collections towards the History and Antiquities of the County of Hereford, containing a general history of the county and an account of the city, was published as a quarto in Hereford in 1804; and the first part of a second volume, containing the hundreds of Broxash and Ewyas Lacy, with a few pages of Greytree hundred, appeared in 1812. However, the Duke died in December 1815, the payments to Duncumb ended, and he then abandoned work on the project.

=== Later developments ===
Following the Duke of Norfolk's death, the unsold portions of the Collections, along with the pages for Greytree hundred (pp. 319–58), which had been printed but not yet published, were regarded as part of the Duke's personal estate. They were taken from Hereford to a warehouse in London, where the parcels lay undisturbed and forgotten until 1837, when the whole stock was acquired by a bookseller, Thomas Thorpe. Thorpe put the two volumes and the pages of Greytree on sale, adding an index. Volume 2 from p. 358 onwards was completed, with an index, in 1866 by Judge William Henry Cooke. Cooke issued a third volume containing the remainder of Greytree in 1882; and another volume, covering parishes in the hundred of Grimsworth, in two parts in 1886 and 1892.

George Strong's Heraldry of Herefordshire (London, 1848), arranged by families, with brief accounts of their seats, claims on its title page to be "Adapted to form a Supplement to 'Duncumb's County History'".

In about 1896, a committee was formed to continue the history, and under its auspices two more volumes, edited by Rev. Morgan G. Watkins and covering Huntington and Radlow hundreds, appeared in 1897 and 1902 respectively. Another volume, edited by John H. Matthews and covering Wormelow hundred, was published in two parts in 1912 and 1913. The project proved impossible to continue, and the residual funds were passed to the Woolhope Naturalists' Field Club (Herefordshire's natural historical, archaeological and historical society), which established the Duncumb Fund to assist the publication of research.

A facsimile reprint of Duncumb's first two volumes was published by the Merton Priory Press in 1996.

The completed volumes – those published by Duncumb, and those edited from his materials by Cooke and Watkins – contain much useful material, but have also been criticised for many inaccuracies on points of detail. Janet Cooper describes them as "collections of material rather than finished histories". Matthews' work is considered more conscientious, but remains "patchy".

== Personal life ==
In 1792 Duncumb married Mary (c.1773–1841), daughter of William Webb of Holmer, near Hereford, by whom he had three children: Thomas Edward (c.1799–1823), William George (c.1807–1836), and a daughter. All died unmarried.

== Bibliography ==
- Cooper, Janet (1994). "Herefordshire". In Currie, C. R. J.; Lewis, C. P. (eds.). English County Histories: a guide. Stroud: Alan Sutton. pp. 176–85 (181–3). ISBN 0-7509-0289-2.
- Duncumb, John (1804–1882). Collections towards the History and Antiquities of the County of Hereford. Hereford. esp. vol. 1, Preface; vol. 2, Postscript, p. 401; vol. 3., Preface.
- "Clergy deceased". Gentleman's Magazine. 2nd ser. 12 (2): 660–1. 1839. (Obituary.)
- Goodwin, Gordon; Whittaker, Robin (revised) (2004). "Duncumb, John (1765–1839)". Oxford Dictionary of National Biography (online ed.). Oxford University Press. doi:10.1093/ref:odnb/8245. (Subscription, Wikipedia Library access or UK public library membership required.)
- Watt, Robert (1824). Bibliotheca Britannica. Vol. 1. Edinburgh. p. 323 "o".

Attribution

- This article incorporates text from a publication now in the public domain: Goodwin, Gordon (1888). "Duncumb, John". In Stephen, Leslie (ed.). Dictionary of National Biography. Vol. 16. London: Smith, Elder & Co. pp. 182–183.
