= Edmund Rack =

English writer on agriculture

Edmund Rack (c.1735 – 22 February 1787), born in Norfolk, England, became well known in Bath, Somerset; he was a writer, particularly about agriculture, and founded notable societies.

== Life ==
Rack was born in Attleborough, Norfolk, about 1735, son of Edmund and Elizabeth Rack. His father was a weaver, and both his parents were Quakers, the mother being a preacher. He was brought up as a Quaker, and apprenticed to a general shopkeeper at Wymondham. At the end of his term he moved to Great Bardfield in Essex, where he became shopman to a Miss Agnes Smith, whom he subsequently married.

About 1775 he settled in Bath, Somerset, and, having cultivated a taste for literature, was patronised by Lady Miller of Batheaston, Mrs Macaulay, and Dr Wilson. Before he left Norfolk he had paid great attention to its system of farming, and, with a view to the improvement of that in use throughout the western counties of England, he drew up, in the autumn of 1777, a plan for the formation of a society for the encouragement of agriculture in the four counties of Somerset, Wiltshire, Dorset, and Gloucester. He was appointed its first secretary, and a room was appropriated for its members in his house at No. 5 St James's Parade. It still exists today, as the Royal Bath and West of England Society.

In 1779 Rack aided in establishing the Bath Philosophical Society, and became its first secretary. Ill-health had long troubled him, and although he gave, in 1777, the notorious James Graham a certificate that he had been cured from "a bad cough and asthmatic complaint," his state soon became worse. His physical condition was not improved by the loss of his savings about 1780. He died in Bath on 22 February 1787. An elegy to his memory by Richard Polwhele, who had made his acquaintance in that city in 1777, appeared in The Gentleman's Magazine for 1787 (pt. ii. p. 717), and was reprinted in Poems by Gentlemen of Devon and Cornwall (i. 162–4).

== Publications ==
Rack was the author of:

1. Reflections on the Spirit and Essence of Christianity, signed "Eusebius", 1771.
2. England's true Interest in the choice of a new Parliament briefly considered. By a Friend to true Liberty, 1774.
3. Poems on Several Subjects, 1775.
4. Mentor's Letters addressed to Youth, 1777, but written five years previously for a few of his young friends; 2nd edition 1777; 3rd edition, revised and corrected, 1778 (three thousand copies were sold of these editions); 4th edition, revised and enlarged, 1785.
5. Essays, Letters, and Poems, 1781. Some of the pieces had appeared in his previous volume of poems, and several of the essays were reprinted from magazines. Two of the poems, The Castle of Tintadgel (pp. 330–7) and The Isle of Poplars, were written by Polwhele.
6. A Respectful Tribute to Thomas Curtis, who died at Bath 4 April 1784. Thirty-six copies were struck off for members of the Bath Philosophical Society. It was also inserted in the Transactions of the Agricultural Society, vol. iii. pp. xvii–xxiv.

Three octavo volumes of papers contributed to the Agricultural Society were published under his editorship, and he wrote a few of the articles. His papers On the Origin and Progress of Agriculture and The Natural History of the Cockchafer were reprinted in the Georgical Essays of Alexander Hunter, and that on the cockchafer also appeared in the Annual Register for 1784–5, pp. 38–9. The second edition of Caspipina's Letters, by the Rev. Jacob Duché, was edited by him in 1777, and he appended to it a brief account of William Penn.

From 1782 to 1786 Rack was actively engaged in making a topographical survey of Somerset, and he had almost completed it before his death. The work was published by the Rev. John Collinson in 1791 in three volumes, entitled The history and antiquities of the county of Somerset.

Rack contributed to the Monthly Ledger and the Monthly Miscellany under the signature of "Eusebius", and he also wrote for the Farmer's Magazine and the Bath Chronicle. Philip Thicknesse accused him of being the author of "A Letter addressed to Philip Thickskull, esq.," and retorted in "A Letter from Philip Thickskull, Esq., to Edmund Rack", 1780 (cf. Edmund—an Eclogue, 1780). He wrote the second of the printed odes presented to Mrs. Macaulay on her birthday in 1777, and in the fourth volume of Poetical Amusements, at Lady Miller's villa, there appeared three poems from his pen.
