= James Bowen (artist) =

English painter & topographer (??–1774)

James Bowen (died 1774) was an English painter and topographer. Bowen was a native of Shrewsbury, where he died. The antiquarian John Bowen was his son.

== Works ==
He made a collection for a history of Shropshire, having taken church notes, sketches of monuments, transcripts of records, etc. when he was accompanying William Mytton through the county. One of Bowen's works is a view of the church of Mary in the Battlefield, Shrewsbury, and he produced also some maps.

Richard Gough bought all the genealogical and topographical materials which Bowen had amassed, and they formed part of the manuscripts and similar relics which Gough bequeathed to the Bodleian Library.
