= John Ogborne =

English engraver

John Ogborne (22 July 1755 – 1837) was an English engraver.

== Biography ==
Ogborne was born on 22 July 1755, the son of David Ogborne, and was baptised at Chelmsford, Essex on 6 August 1755. He was a pupil of Francesco Bartolozzi and one of the band of stipple-engravers who worked under that artist. He produced some excellent specimens of engraving in this branch of art, and later, by combining a certain amount of work in line with that in stipple, produced a variety of effect. He engraved some plates after John Boydell, Robert Smirke, and Thomas Stothard, for Boydell's 'Shakespeare Gallery,' and a great number of plates after Angelica Kauffmann, William Hamilton, William Redmore Bigg, Richard Westall, Thomas Stothard, and others. He was also largely employed in engraving portraits, including those for Thane's 'Illustrious British Characters.' He engraved a portrait of Thane, in the line manner, after W. R. Bigg. His wife Mary Ogborne, appears on two plates after William Hamilton, and may have assisted him in other works. A number of his prints were published by himself at 68 Great Portland Street, London. Ogborne also made topographical views using aquatint engraving techniques. He appears to have died in 1837.
