= Anthony Allen (lawyer) =

English lawyer and antiquary

Anthony Allen (died 11 April 1754) was an English lawyer and antiquary

== Life ==
Allen was born at Great Hadham in Hertfordshire, about the end of the seventeenth century. He went to Eton College and King's College, Cambridge, earning his bachelor's degree in 1707, and his master's in 1711. He was a Fellow of King's College from 1706 to 1717.

Admitted to the Middle Temple in 1704, Allen was called to the bar in 1710. Through the influence of Arthur Onslow, speaker of the House of Commons, he became a master in chancery in 1728.

Esteemed as a classical scholar, Allen was a wit of convivial habits. He later became an alderman of the corporation of Guildford, and a useful magistrate in that area. In 1739, he served as a founding governor of the Foundling Hospital in London. He died on 11 April 1754 and was buried in the Temple Church.

== Writings ==
Allen collected a biographical account of the members of Eton College, which by his will, dated 1753, he ordered to be placed in the libraries of the two colleges, and a third copy to be given to his patron, Christian Cronauer. He also compiled, in his leisure hours, or rather made collections for, an English dictionary of obsolete words, of words which have changed their meaning, such as villain, knave, and of proverbial or cant words, such as helter skelter, which he derived from hilariter celeriter. Allen's junior clerk, Thomas Sibthorpe, was bequeathed this manuscript material, Allen's law dictionary, and his law reports.
